= List of moths of India (Noctuidae) =

This is a list of moths of the family Noctuidae (sensu Kitching & Rawlins, 1999) that are found in India. It also acts as an index to the species articles and forms part of the full List of moths of India. Subfamilies and species are listed alphabetically, though the list order of Catocalinae is based on Holloway, 2005. Species listed are those extracted from Kendrick (2002 [2003]) and will be augmented by the species listed in Hampson (vol. 2, 1894; vol. 3, 1895), once the updated nomenclature has been worked out and cross referenced against LepIndex.

== Subfamily Acronictinae ==
- Acronicta pruinosa (Guenée, 1852)
- Apsarasa radians
- Bryophilina mollicula (Graeser, 1888 [1889])
- Tycracrona obliqua Moore, 1882

== Subfamily Aganainae ==
- Aganais ficus Fabricius, 1775
- Asota caricae (Fabricius, 1775)
- Asota egens indica Jordan, 1897
- Asota egens andamana Moore, 1877
- Asota ficus (Fabricius, 1775)
- Asota heliconia (Linnaeus, 1758)
- Asota plaginota Butler, 1875
- Asota plana (Butler, 1881)
- Asota tortuosa Moore, 1872
- Peridrome orbicularis Walker 1854
- Peridrome subfascia Walker, 1854
- Sommeria marchalii Walker 1864
- Neochera dominia Cramer, 1780
- Neochera inops (Walker, 1854)
- Neochera privata Walker, 1862
- Sarbanissa transiens

== Subfamily Agaristinae ==
- Aegocera bimacula Walker, 1854
- Aegocera venulia (Cramer, 1777)
- Episteme arctopsa (Chu & Chen, 1962)
- Exsula dentatrix (Westwood, 1848)
- Pimprana atkinsoni Moore, 1879
- Sarbanissa albifascia (Walker, 1865)

== Subfamily Bagisarinae ==
- Bagisara plagiata (Walker, 1858)
- Chasmina judicata (Walker, 1858)
- Sphragifera rejecta (Fabricius, 1775)
- Xanthodes intersepta Guenée, 1852
- Xanthodes transversa Guenée, 1852

== Subfamily Catocalinae ==
- Achaea janata (Linnaeus, 1758)
- Acharya crassicornis Moore, 1882
- Aedia leucomelas (Linnaeus, 1758)
- Aedia perdicipennis (Moore, 1882)
- Anisoneura aluco (Fabricius, 1775)
- Anisoneura salebrosa Guenée, 1852
- Anomis erosa Hübner 1821
- Anomis figlina Butler, 1889
- Anomis flava (Fabricius 1775)
- Anomis impasta Guenée 1852
- Anomis involuta (Walker 1858)
- Anomis lyona (Swinhoe 1919)
- Anomis mesogona (Walker 1858)
- Anomis nigritarsis (Walker 1858)
- Anomis sabulifera (Guenée 1852)
- Anticarsia irrorata (Fabricius, 1781)
- Arcte coerula (Guenée, 1852)
- Arsacia rectalis (Walker, 1863)
- Artena dotata (Fabricius, 1794)
- Athyrmina birthana (Swinhoe, 1905)
- Attonda adspersa (Felder & Rogenhofer, 1874)
- Avitta fasciosa Moore, 1882
- Bamra mundata (Walker, 1858)
- Bastilla absentimacula (Guenée, 1852)
- Bastilla amygdalis (Moore, [1885] 1884–1887)
- Bastilla analis (Guenée, 1852)
- Bastilla arcuata (Moore, 1887)
- Bastilla crameri (Moore, [1885] 1884–1887)
- Bastilla fulvotaenia (Guenée, 1852)
- Bastilla joviana (Stoll, 1782)
- Bastilla maturata (Walker, 1858)
- Bastilla maturescens (Walker, 1858)
- Bastilla praetermissa (Warren, 1913)
- Bastilla simillima (Guenée, 1852)
- Blasticorhinus rivulosa (Walker, 1865)
- Bocula caradrinoides Guenée, 1852
- Bocula diffisa (Swinhoe, 1890)
- Bocula marginata (Moore, 1882)
- Bocula pallens (Moore, 1882)
- Buzara onelia (Guenée, 1852)
- Calesia dasyptera (Kollar, 1844)
- Calesia haemorrhoa Guenée, 1852
- Calyptra minuticornis (Guenée, 1852)
- Calyptra pseudobicolor (Bänziger, 1979)
- Catephia dentifera (Moore, 1882)
- Catocala tapestrina Moore, 1882
- Chalciope mygdon (Cramer, 1777)
- Chilkasa perhamata (Hampson, 1894)
- Coarica fasciata Moore, 1882
- Condate angulina (Guenée, 1852)
- Corcobara angulipennis Moore, 1882
- Cosmophila flava (Fabricius, 1775)
- Crithote horridipes Walker, 1864
- Cultripalpa partita Guenée, 1852
- Cyclodes omma (Hoeven, 1840)
- Daddala lucilla (Butler, 1881)
- Daddala quadrisignata Walker, 1865
- Dierna patibulum (Fabricius, 1794)
- Dinumma deponens Walker, 1858
- Dinumma placens Walker, 1858
- Diomea rotundata Walker, [1858] 1857
- Dordura aliena Walker, 1865
- Dysgonia stuposa (Fabricius, 1794)
- Egnasia accingalis Walker, 1858
- Egnasia caduca swinhoe, 1892
- Egnasia castanea Moore, 1882
- Egnasia ephyrodalis Walker, 1858
- Egnasia fasciata (Moore, 1882)
- Egnasia mesotypa Swinhoe, 1906
- Egnasia ochreivena Hampson, 1894
- Egnasia polia Hampson, 1891
- Egnasia rectilineata Swinhoe, 1890
- Egnasia participalis Walker, 1858
- Egnasia sinuosa Moore, 1882
- Egnasia tripuncta Swinhoe, 1890
- Entomogramma fautrix Guenée, 1852
- Ercheia cyllaria (Cramer, 1779)
- Ercheia umbrosa Butler, 1881
- Erebus macrops (Linnaeus, 1770)
- Ericeia eriophora (Guenée, 1852)
- Ericeia inangulata (Guenée, 1852)
- Ericeia pertendens (Walker, 1858)
- Erygia apicalis Guenée, 1852
- Eudocima homaena Hübner, [1823] 1816
- Eudocima hypermnestra (Stoll, 1780)
- Eudocima phalonia (Linnaeus, 1763)
- Eudocima salaminia (Cramer, 1777)
- Eudocima tyrannus (Guenée, 1852)
- Eutrogia morosa (Moore, 1882)
- Falana sordida Moore, 1882
- Gesonia obeditalis Walker, [1859] 1858
- Goniocraspedon mistura (Swinhoe, 1891)
- Gonitis involuta Walker, [1858] 1857
- Gonitis mesogona Walker, [1858] 1857
- Grammodes geometrica (Fabricius, 1775)
- Hepatica irrorata (Wileman & South, 1917)
- Hepatica linealis (Leech, 1889)
- Hulodes caranea (Cramer, 1780)
- Hypersypnoides submarginata (Walker, 1865)
- Hypocala deflorata (Fabricius, 1794)
- Hypocala rostrata (Fabricius, 1794)
- Hypocala subsatura Guenée, 1852
- Hypocala violacea Butler, 1879
- Hypopyra ossigera Guenée, 1852
- Hypopyra vespertilio (Fabricius, 1787)
- Hyposemansis singha Guenée, 1852
- Hypospila bolinoides Guenée, 1852
- Ischyja ferrifracta (Walker, [1863] 1864)
- Lacera alope Cramer, 1781
- Lacera noctilio (Fabricius, 1794)
- Lacera procellosa Butler, 1879
- Lophathrum comprimens (Walker, 1858)
- Loxioda fasciosa (Moore 1882)
- Loxioda similis Moore, 1882
- Lycimna polymesata Walker, 1860
- Macaldenia palumba (Guenée, 1852)
- Marapana pulverata (Guenée, 1852)
- Mecodina aequilinea Hampson, 1926
- Mocis frugalis (Fabricius, 1775)
- Mocis undata (Fabricius, 1775)
- Nagadeba indecoralis Walker, [1886] 1865
- Ommatophora luminosa (Cramer, 1780)
- Ophisma gravata Guenée, 1852
- Ophiusa disjungens (Walker, 1858)
- Ophiusa indistincta (Moore, 1882)
- Ophiusa olista (Swinhoe, 1893)
- Ophiusa tirhaca (Cramer, 1780)
- Ophiusa triphaenoides (Walker, 1858)
- Oraesia emarginata (Fabricius, 1794)
- Oraesia excavata (Butler, 1878)
- Oxyodes scrobiculata (Fabricius, 1775)
- Pandesma anysa Guenée, 1852
- Pandesma quenavadi Guenée, 1852
- Pangrapta albistigma (Hampson, 1898)
- Pantura rufifrons (Moore, 1887)
- Pantydia metaspila (Walker, [1858] 1857)
- Pindara illibata (Fabricius, 1775)
- Platyja ciacula Swinhoe, 1893
- Platyja umminea (Cramer, 1780)
- Plecoptera luteiceps (Walker, 1865)
- Plecoptera oculata (Moore, 1882)
- Plecoptera recta (Pagenstacher, 1886)
- Plecoptera reflexa Guenée, 1852
- Plecoptera quadrilineata (Moore 1882)
- Plecoptera uniformis (Moore, 1882)
- Plusiodonta coelonota (Kollar, 1844)
- Polydesma boarmoides Guenée, 1852
- Pseudosphetta Moorei (Cotes & Swinhoe, 1885)
- Psimada quadripennis Walker, 1858
- Raparna transversa Moore, 1882
- Rema costimacula (Guenée, 1852)
- Rhesala imparata Walker, 1858
- Saroba pustulifera Walker, 1865
- Sarobides inconclusa (Walker, [1863] 1864)
- Schistorhynx argentistriga Hampson, 1898
- Serrodes campana Guenée, 1852
- Sphingomorpha chlorea (Cramer, 1777)
- Spirama retorta (Clerck, 1759)
- Sympis rufibasis Guenée, 1852
- Talapoptera duplexa (Moore, 1882)
- Tamba apicata (Hampson, 1902)
- Thalatta fasciosa Moore, 1882
- Throana pectinifer (Hampson, 1898)
- Thyas coronata (Fabricius, 1775)
- Thyas juno (Dalman, 1823)
- Tinolius eburneigutta Walker, 1855
- Tinolius hypsana Swinhoe, 1889
- Tochara creberrima (Walker, 1858)
- Trigonodes hyppasia (Cramer, 1779)
- Ugia insuspecta Galsworthy, 1997
- Ugia mediorufa (Hampson, 1894)
- Ugia transversa (Moore, 1882)

== Subfamily Condicinae ==
- Bagada poliomera (Hampson, 1908)
- Condica albigutta (Wileman, 1912)
- Condica dolorosa (Walker, 1865)
- Condica illecta (Walker, 1865)
- Perigea chinensis Wallengren, 1860

== Subfamily Eriopinae ==
- Callopistria aethiops Butler, 1878
- Callopistria guttulalis Hampson, 1906
- Callopistria juventina (Stoll, 1782)
- Callopistria palcodoides (Guenée, 1862)
- Callopistria repleta Walker, [1858] 1857

== Subfamily Eustrotiinae ==
- Amyna octo (Guenée, 1852)
- Amyna punctum (Fabricius, 1794)
- Autoba abrupta (Walker, 1865)
- Autoba angulifera (Moore, 1882)
- Autoba obscura (Moore, 1882)
- Autoba rubra (Hampson, 1902)
- Catoblemma semialba (Hampson, 1902)
- Deltote fuscicilia Hampson, 1891
- Deltote marginata Walker, 1866
- Eublemma albipennis Hampson, 1910
- Eublemma anachoresis (Wallengren, 1863)
- Eublemma antoninae Nagaraja & Nagarkatti, 1970
- Eublemma baccalix (Swinhoe, 1886)
- Eublemma bifasciata (Moore, 1881)
- Eublemma bulla (Swinhoe, 1884)
- Eublemma cochylioides (Guenée, 1852)
- Eublemma conspersa (Butler, 1880)
- Eublemma dimidialis (Fabricius, 1794)
- Eublemma epistrota Hampson, 1910
- Eublemma exigua (Walker, [1858])
- Eublemma miasma (Hampson, 1891)
- Eublemma parva (Hübner, [1808])
- Eublemma pudica (Snellen, 1880)
- Eublemma pulchra (Swinhoe, 1886)
- Eublemma quadrilineata (Moore, 1881)
- Eublemma ragusana (Freyer, 1845)
- Eublemma rivula (Moore, 1882)
- Eublemma roseana (Moore, 1881)
- Eublemma sarcosia Hampson, 1910
- Eublemma trifasciata (Moore, 1881)
- Eustrotia marginata (Walker, 1866)
- Hyperstrotia molybdota Hampson, 1910
- Lithacodia crotopha (Swinhoe, 1905)
- Maliattha quadripartita (Walker, 1865)
- Maliattha separata Walker, 1863
- Maliattha signifera (Walker, [1858] 1857)
- Micardia pulcherrima (Moore, 1867)
- Ozarba albimarginata (Hampson, 1895)
- Ozarba badia (Swinhoe, 1886)
- Ozarba bipars Hampson, 1891
- Ozarba brunnea (Leech, 1900)
- Oruza divisa (Walker, 1862)
- Ozarba excisa Hampson, 1891
- Ozarba glaucescens Hampson, 1910
- Ozarba hemiphaea (Hampson, 1907)
- Ozarba hypenoides (Butler, 1889)
- Ozarba incondita Butler, 1889
- Ozarba itwarra Swinhoe, 1885
- Ozarba mallarba Swinhoe, 1885
- Ozarba pallida Hampson, 1910
- Ozarba phlebitis Hampson, 1910
- Ozarba punctigera Walker, 1865
- Ozarba rectifascia (Hampson, 1894)
- Ozarba rectificata Berio, 1950
- Ozarba reducta Berio, 1940
- Ozarba rufula Hampson, 1910
- Ozarba semirubra Hampson, 1910
- Ozarba uberosa (Swinhoe, 1885)
- Ozarba umbrifera Hampson, 1910
- Ozarba venata Butler, 1889

== Subfamily Euteliinae ==
- Anuga multiplicans (Walker, 1858)
- Eutelia adulatricoides (Mell, 1943)
- Eutelia favillatrixoides Poole, 1989
- Eutelia geyeri (Felder & Rogenhofer, 1874)
- Paectes subapicalis (Walker, [1858] 1857)

== Subfamily Hadeninae ==
- Apamea sodalis (Butler, 1878)
- Aeologramma albiscripta (Hampson, 1897)
- Antha grata (Butler, 1881)
- Apsarasa radians (Westwood, 1848)
- Athetis bremusa (Swinhoe, 1885)
- Athetis cognata (Moore, 1882)
- Athetis delecta (Moore, 1881)
- Athetis sincera (Swinhoe, 1889)
- Athetis stellata (Moore, 1882)
- Callyna monoleuca Walker, 1858
- Callyna semivitta Moore, 1882
- Dyptergina indica (Moore, 1867)
- Elusa antennata (Moore, 1882)
- Feliniopsis hyperythra Galsworthy, 1997
- Feliniopsis indistans (Guenée, 1852)
- Mythimna byssina Swinhoe, 1886
- Mythimna compta Moore, 1881
- Mythimna curvilinea Hampson, 1891
- Mythimna fasciata (Moore, 1881)
- Mythimna formosana Butler, 1880
- Mythimna Moorei (Swinhoe, 1902)
- Mythimna pallidicosta (Hampson, 1894)
- Mythimna separata (Walker, 1865)
- Mythimna snelleni Hreblay, 1996
- Mythimna tangala Felder & Rogenhofer, 1874
- Mythimna yu Guenée, 1852
- Nonagria grisescens (Hampson, 1910)
- Sasunaga tenebrosa (Moore, 1867)
- Spodoptera mauritia (Boisduval, 1833)
- Tiracola aureata Holloway, 1989
- Tiracola plagiata (Walker, 1857)
- Trachea auriplena (Walker, 1857)
- Xylostola indistincta (Moore, 1882)

== Subfamily Heliothinae ==
- Helicoverpa armigera (Hübner, [1809])
- Heliothis cruentata (Moore, 1881)
- Heliothis irrorata (Moore, 1881)

== Subfamily Noctuinae ==
- Agrotis segetum ([Denis & Schiffermüller], 1775)
- Diarsia canescens (Butler, 1878)

== Subfamily Pantheinae ==
- Antitrisuloides catocalina (Moore, 1882)
- Viridistria striatovirens (Moore, 1883)
- Viridistria thoracica (Moore, 1882)
- Viridistria viridipicta (Hampson, 1902)

== Subfamily Plusiinae ==
- Agrapha furcifera (Walker, [1858] 1857)
- Chrysodeixis acuta (Walker, [1858] 1857)
- Chrysodeixis chalcites (Esper, 1789)
- Chrysodeixis eriosoma (Doubleday, 1843)
- Ctenoplusia agnata (Staudinger, 1892)
- Anadevidia peponis (Fabricius, 1775)
- Dactyloplusia impulsa (Walker, 1865)
- Sclerogenia jessica (Butler, 1878)
- Scriptoplusia nigriluna (Walker, [1858] 1857)
- Trichoplusia daubei (Boisduval, 1840)
- Trichoplusia intermixta (Warren, 1913)
- Trichoplusia ni (Hübner, [1803])
- Zonoplusia ochreata (Walker, 1865)

== Subfamily Stictopterinae ==
- Gyrtona todara (Hampson, 1912)
- Lophoptera anthyalus (Hampson, 1894)
- Lophoptera hemithyris (Hampson, 1905)
- Lophoptera longipennis (Moore, 1882)
- Lophoptera squammigera Guenée, 1852

== Subfamily Strepsimanninae ==
- Luceria oculalis (Moore, 1877)

== See also ==
- Noctuidae
- Moths
- Lepidoptera
- List of moths of India
