= Marapana (surname) =

Marapana (Sinhala: මාරපන, romanized: Mārapana) is a Sinhalese surname. Notable people with the surname include:

- Duleeka Marapana (born 1975), Sri Lankan actress and media personality
- Tilak Marapana (born 1942), Sri Lankan politician and the 36th Attorney General

== See also ==
- Marapana, Genus of moths
- Marapana pulverata, Species of insect
