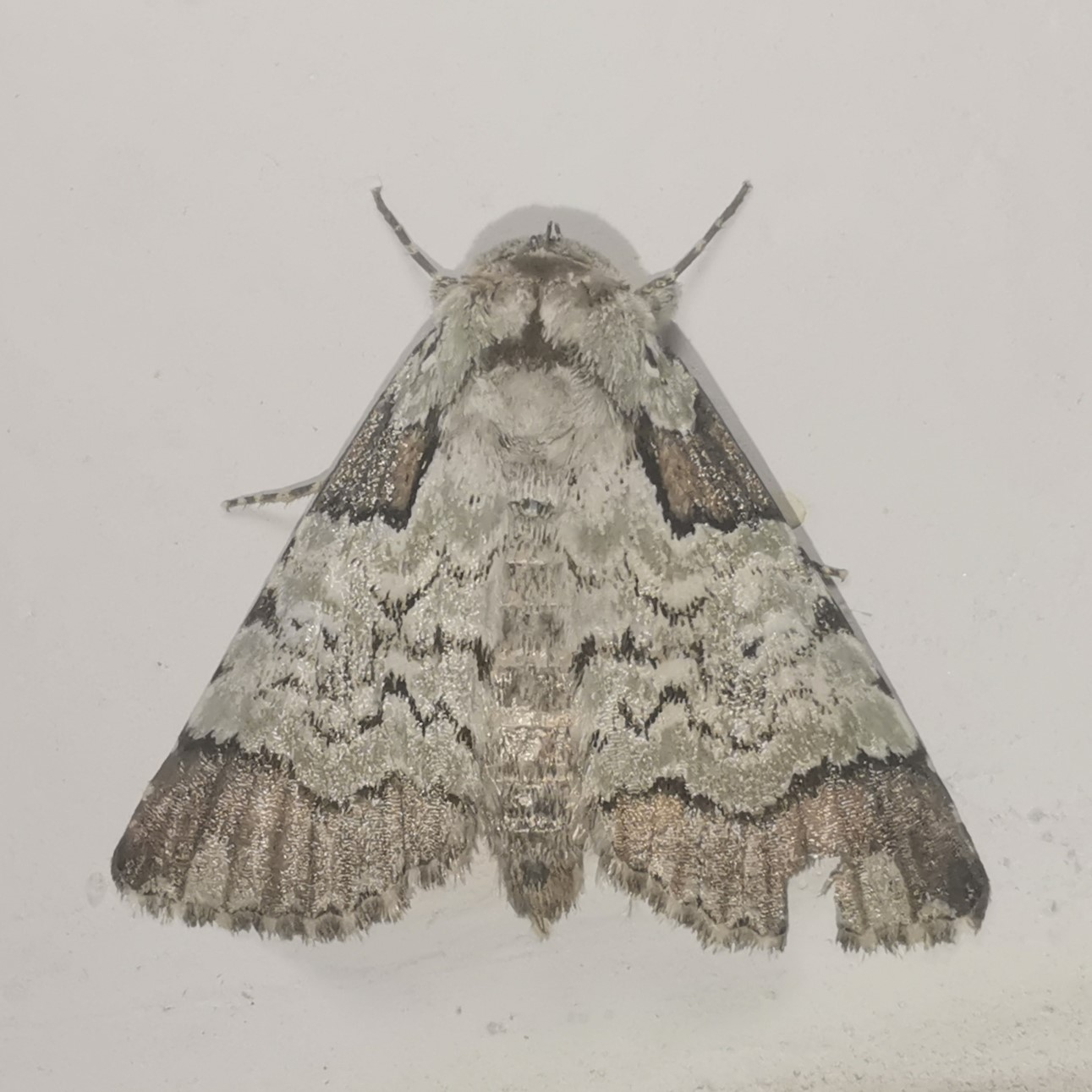
- Belciana pinratanai

Scientific classification
- Kingdom: Animalia
- Phylum: Arthropoda
- Class: Insecta
- Order: Lepidoptera
- Superfamily: Noctuoidea
- Family: Erebidae
- Subfamily: Calpinae
- Genus: Belciana; Walker, 1862

Synonyms
- Diphtheroides Walker, 1862; Diptheroides Bethune-Baker, 1906; Nalca Walker, 1866

= Belciana =

Genus of moths

Belciana is a genus of moths in the family Noctuidae.

== Species ==
The following species are recognised in the genus Belciana:

- Belciana bicolor Wileman & West, 1929
- Belciana biformis (Walker, 1858)
- Belciana caerulea Hampson, 1926
- Belciana euchlora Hampson, 1926
- Belciana habroscia Prout, 1924
- Belciana hemodoides Holloway, 2009
- Belciana hreblayi Behounek, Han & Kononenko, 2015
- Belciana kala Prout, 1924
- Belciana kenricki (Bethune-Baker, 1906)
- Belciana particolor Prout, 1924
- Belciana prasina (Swinhoe, 1903)
- Belciana pratti (Bethune-Baker, 1906)
- Belciana scorpio Galsworthy, 1997
- Belciana serrata (Bethune-Baker, 1906)
- Belciana sophronia (Moore, 1883)
- Belciana staudingeri (Leech, 1900)
- Belciana striatovirens Prout, 1924
- Belciana subserrata Prout, 1924
- Belciana viridipicta (Hampson, 1902)
- BOLD:AAW2925 (Belciana sp.)
- BOLD:ABA9524 (Belciana sp.)
