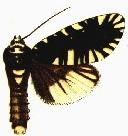

Scientific classification
- Domain: Eukaryota
- Kingdom: Animalia
- Phylum: Arthropoda
- Class: Insecta
- Order: Lepidoptera
- Superfamily: Noctuoidea
- Family: Noctuidae
- Genus: Apsarasa
- Species: A. praslini

Binomial name
- Apsarasa praslini (Boisduval, 1832)

Synonyms
- Apsarasa moluccana Grünberg, 1911; Apsarasa nigrocaerulea Hampson, 1910; Apsarasa wallacei Moore, 1881; Apsarasa atramenta Hampson, 1910

= Apsarasa praslini =

Species of moth

Apsarasa praslini is a moth of the family Noctuidae first described by Jean Baptiste Boisduval in 1832. It is found in south-eastern Asia, from the Moluccas eastward.
