= Micardia =

Scientific classification
- Domain: Eukaryota
- Kingdom: Animalia
- Phylum: Arthropoda
- Class: Insecta
- Order: Lepidoptera
- Superfamily: Noctuoidea
- Family: Noctuidae
- Subfamily: Eustrotiinae
- Genus: Micardia; Butler, 1878

Genus of moths

Micardia is a genus of moths of the family Noctuidae.

== Species ==
- Micardia argentata Butler, 1878 (from China, North Korea and Japan)
- Micardia argentoidea Berio, 1954 (from Madagascar)
- Micardia distincta Chen & Xue, 2012 (from China (Sichuan))
- Micardia ikoly Viette, 1982 (from Madagascar)
- Micardia itremo Viette, 1982 (from Madagascar)
- Micardia minuta Chen & Xue, 2012 (from China (Yunnan))
- Micardia munda Leech, 1900 (from China and Myanmar)
- Micardia pallens Chen & Xue, 2012 (from China (Hubei))
- Micardia pulcherrima (Moore, 1867) (from Bhutan, China (Tibet), India)
- Micardia pulchra Butler, 1878
- Micardia quadrilinea Scriba, 1921
- Micardia simplicissima Berio, 1973 (from Madagascar)
- Micardia terracottoides Berio, 1954 (from Madagascar)
