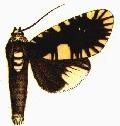

Scientific classification
- Domain: Eukaryota
- Kingdom: Animalia
- Phylum: Arthropoda
- Class: Insecta
- Order: Lepidoptera
- Superfamily: Noctuoidea
- Family: Noctuidae
- Subfamily: Acronictinae
- Genus: Apsarasa; Moore, 1867

= Apsarasa =

Genus of moths

Apsarasa is a genus of moths of the family Noctuidae. The genus was erected by Frederic Moore in 1867.

== Species ==
- Apsarasa praslini Boisduval, 1832
- Apsarasa radians Westwood, 1848
