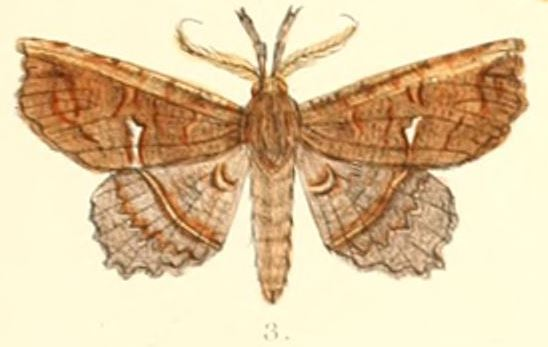
- Acharya crassicornis

Scientific classification
- Domain: Eukaryota
- Kingdom: Animalia
- Phylum: Arthropoda
- Class: Insecta
- Order: Lepidoptera
- Superfamily: Noctuoidea
- Family: Erebidae
- Subfamily: Calpinae
- Genus: Acharya; Moore, 1882

= Acharya (moth) =

Genus of moths

Acharya is a genus of moths of the family Erebidae described by Frederic Moore in 1882.

== Species ==
- Acharya crassicornis Moore, 1882
- Acharya franconia (C. Swinhoe, 1903)
