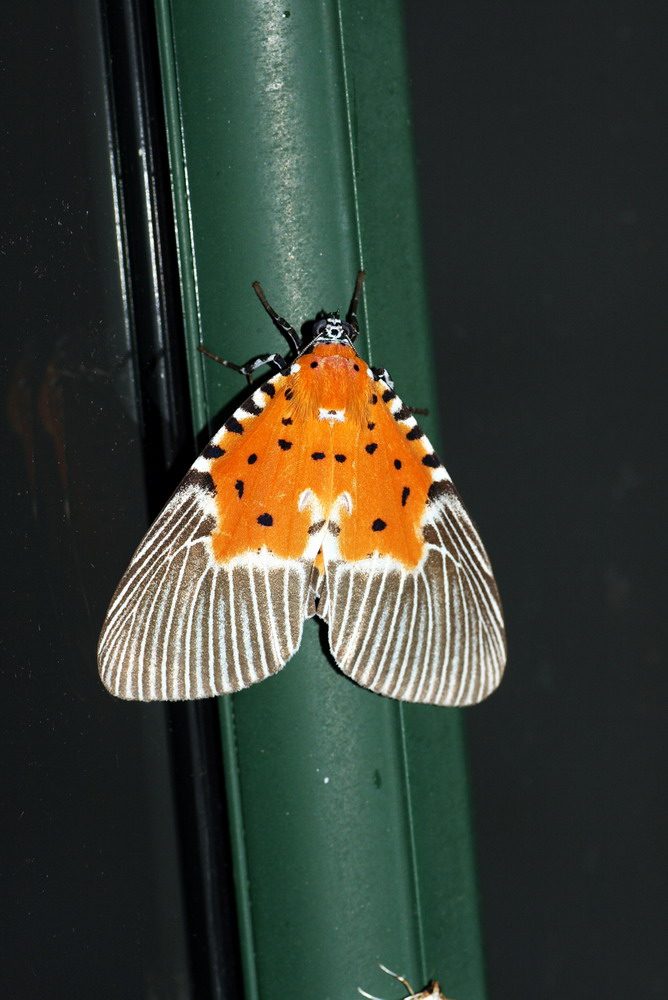

Scientific classification
- Kingdom: Animalia
- Phylum: Arthropoda
- Class: Insecta
- Order: Lepidoptera
- Superfamily: Noctuoidea
- Family: Erebidae
- Subfamily: Aganainae
- Genus: Peridrome; Walker, 1854

Synonyms
- Anagnia Walker, 1854; Aganopis Herrich-Schäffer, 1856; Anagina Swinhoe, 1890 (lapsus calami)

= Peridrome =

Genus of moths

Peridrome is a genus of moths in the family Erebidae erected by Francis Walker in 1854.

== Species ==
- Peridrome orbicularis Walker, 1854
- Peridrome subfascia Walker, 1854
