= Micardia argentata =

Scientific classification
- Domain: Eukaryota
- Kingdom: Animalia
- Phylum: Arthropoda
- Class: Insecta
- Order: Lepidoptera
- Superfamily: Noctuoidea
- Family: Noctuidae
- Genus: Micardia
- Species: M. argentata

Binomial name
- Micardia argentata Butler, 1878

Synonyms
- Eustrotia argentata

Species of moth

Micardia argentata is a species of moth of the family Noctuidae first described by Arthur Gardiner Butler in 1878. It is found in China, Korea and Japan.
