= Antitrisuloides siamensis =

Scientific classification
- Domain: Eukaryota
- Kingdom: Animalia
- Phylum: Arthropoda
- Class: Insecta
- Order: Lepidoptera
- Superfamily: Noctuoidea
- Family: Noctuidae
- Genus: Antitrisuloides
- Species: A. siamensis

Binomial name
- Antitrisuloides siamensis Behounek & Kononenko, 2011

Species of moth

Antitrisuloides siamensis is a moth of the family Noctuidae. It is found in Thailand.
