= Saroba ceylonica =

Scientific classification
- Kingdom: Animalia
- Phylum: Arthropoda
- Clade: Pancrustacea
- Class: Insecta
- Order: Lepidoptera
- Superfamily: Noctuoidea
- Family: Erebidae
- Genus: Saroba
- Species: S. ceylonica

Binomial name
- Saroba ceylonica (Walker, 1865)

Synonyms
- Thermesia ceylonica Walker, 1865; Capnodes cascalis Swinhoe, 1891; Capnodes asulca Swinhoe, 1918

Species of moth

Saroba ceylonica is a moth of the family Noctuidae first described by Francis Walker in 1865. It is found in the Indian subregion, the Andaman Islands, Singapore, Sumatra, Borneo and Sri Lanka.

Its forewings are dark, dull brown. Reniform marks of punctate blackish fasciation found on the forewing.
