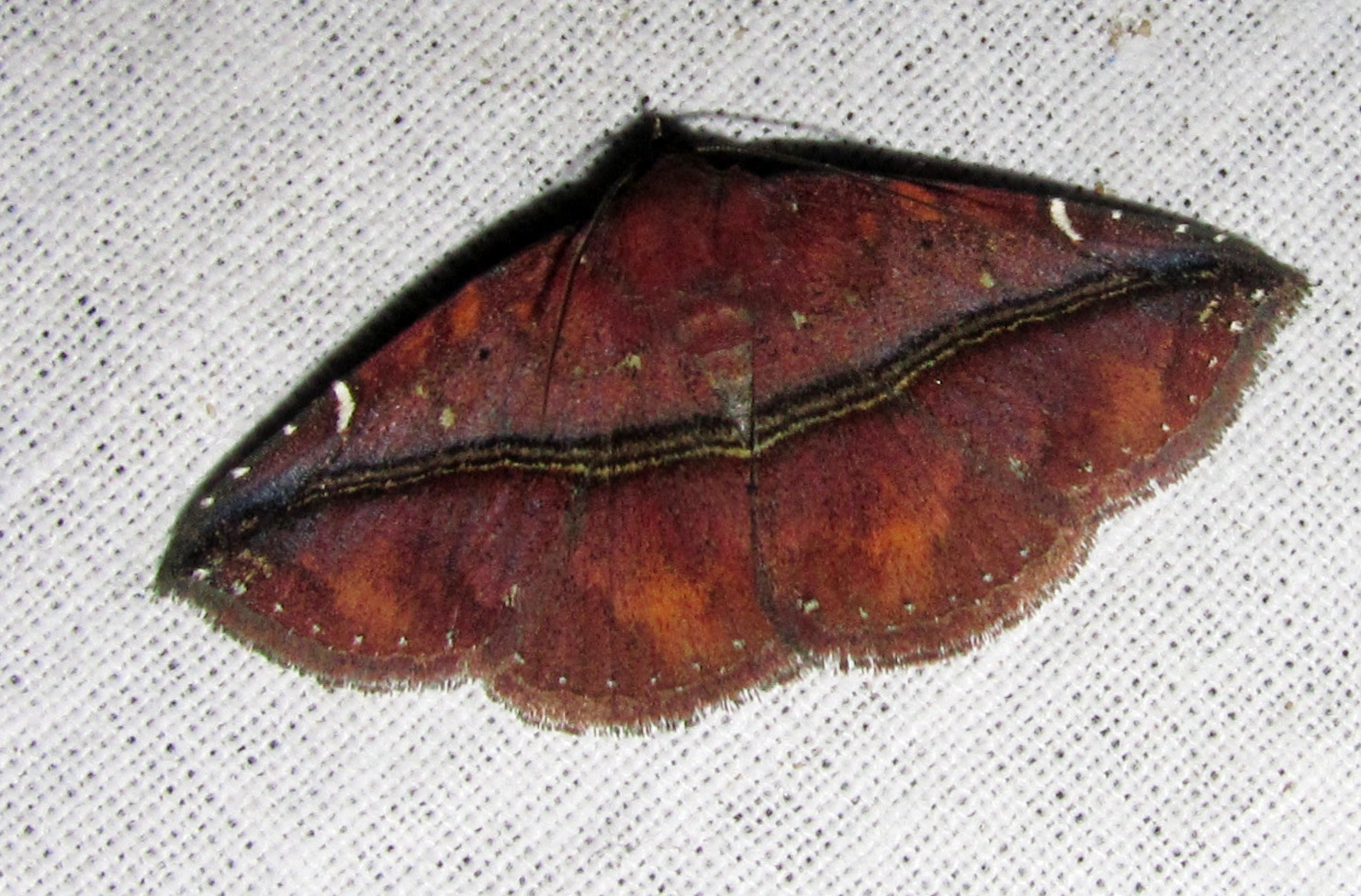
- Condate purpurea

Scientific classification
- Kingdom: Animalia
- Phylum: Arthropoda
- Class: Insecta
- Order: Lepidoptera
- Superfamily: Noctuoidea
- Family: Erebidae
- Genus: Condate
- Species: C. purpurea

Binomial name
- Condate purpurea Hampson 1902

= Condate purpurea =

Species of moth

Condate purpurea is a moth in the family Erebidae. It is found in Southeast Asia.
