= Condate arenacea =

Scientific classification
- Kingdom: Animalia
- Phylum: Arthropoda
- Class: Insecta
- Order: Lepidoptera
- Superfamily: Noctuoidea
- Family: Erebidae
- Genus: Condate
- Species: C. arenacea

Binomial name
- Condate arenacea Walker, 1865

Species of moth

Condate arenacea is a moth of the family Erebidae first described by Francis Walker in 1865. It is found in Sri Lanka and Australia.
