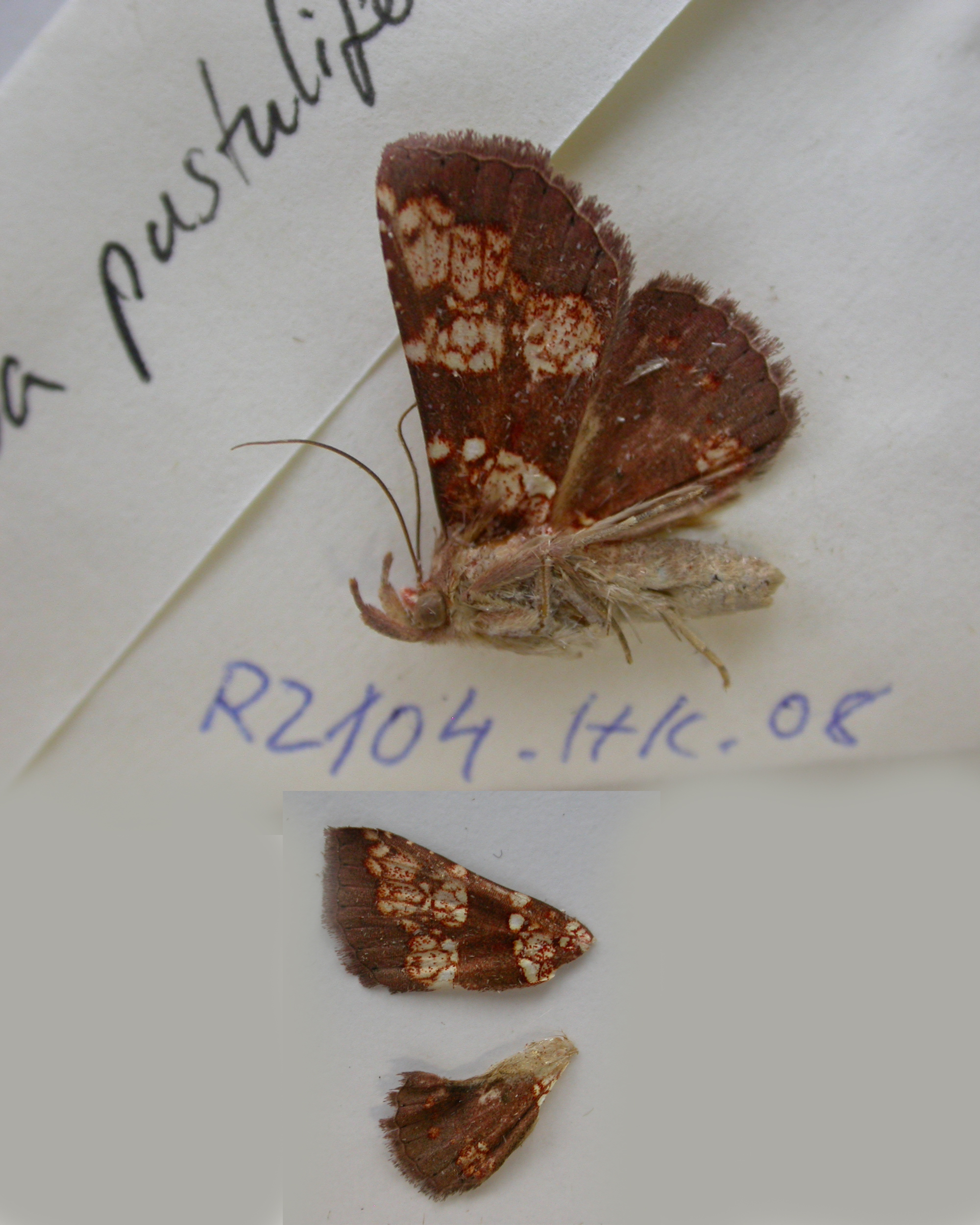

Scientific classification
- Kingdom: Animalia
- Phylum: Arthropoda
- Class: Insecta
- Order: Lepidoptera
- Superfamily: Noctuoidea
- Family: Erebidae
- Subfamily: Calpinae
- Genus: Saroba; Walker, 1865

= Saroba =

Genus of moths

Saroba is a genus of moths of the family Noctuidae.

== Description ==
Palpi sickle shaped, where the second joint reaching above vertex of head and tapering to extremity. Third joint long. Antennae ciliated in male. Thorax and abdomen smoothly scaled. Tibia moderately hairy. Forewings with nearly rectangular apex. Hindwings with usually truncate anal angle. Vein 5 from below middle of discocellular.

== Species ==
- Saroba ceylonica Walker, 1865
- Saroba maculicosta Walker, 1858
- Saroba niphomacula Lower, 1903
- Saroba pustulifera Walker, 1865
- Saroba rufescens Pagenstecher, 1884
- Saroba trimaculata Warren, 1903
