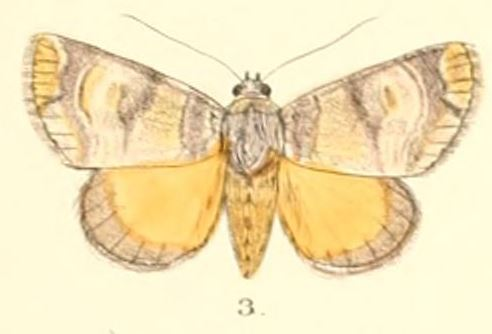
- Antitrisuloides catocalina

Scientific classification
- Kingdom: Animalia
- Phylum: Arthropoda
- Clade: Pancrustacea
- Class: Insecta
- Order: Lepidoptera
- Superfamily: Noctuoidea
- Family: Noctuidae
- Subfamily: Pantheinae
- Genus: Antitrisuloides; Holloway, 1985

= Antitrisuloides =

Genus of moths

Antitrisuloides is a genus of moths of the family Noctuidae.

== Species ==
- Antitrisuloides catocalina (Moore, 1882) (India)
- Antitrisuloides siamensis Behounek & Kononenko, 2011 (Thailand)
