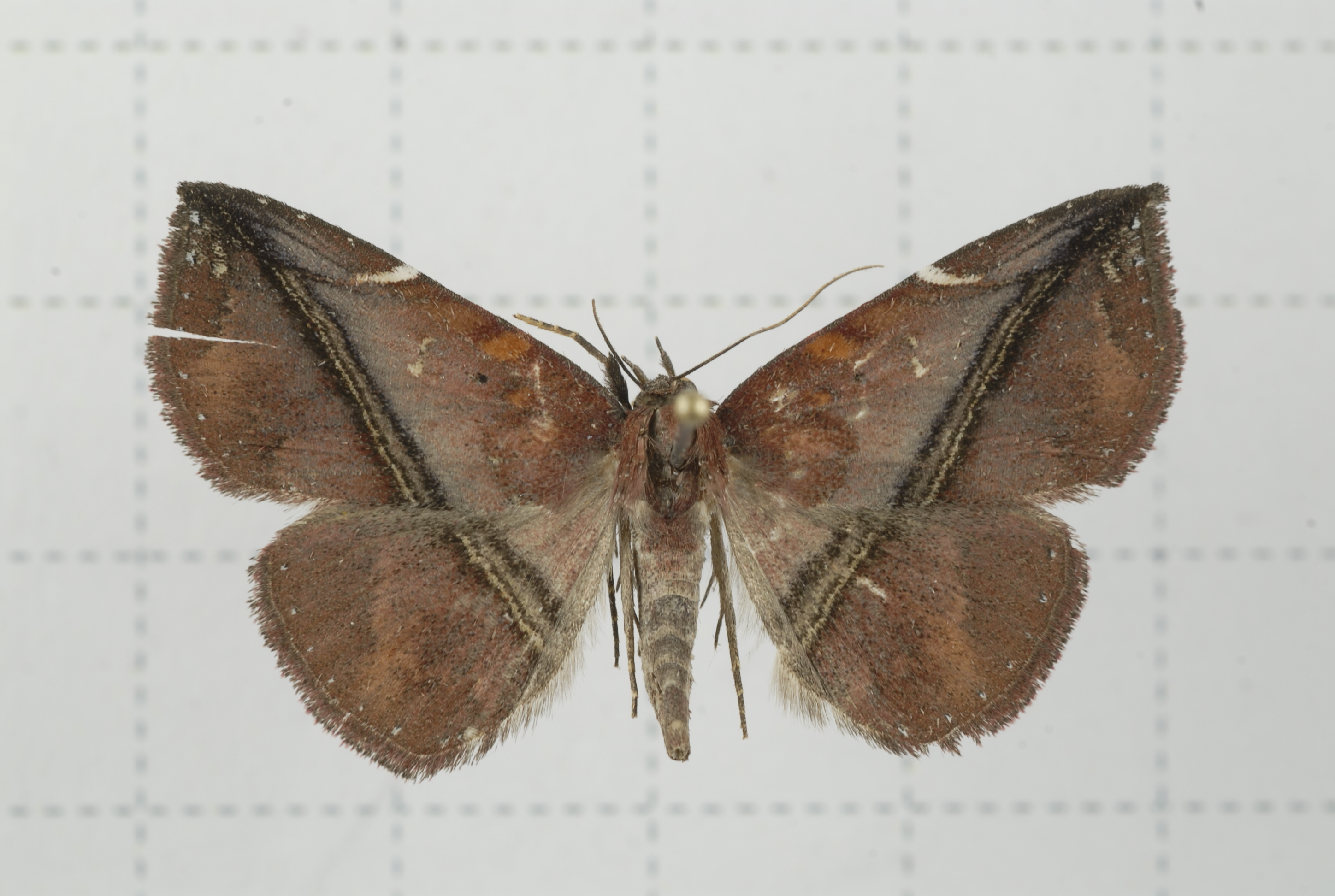

Scientific classification
- Kingdom: Animalia
- Phylum: Arthropoda
- Class: Insecta
- Order: Lepidoptera
- Superfamily: Noctuoidea
- Family: Erebidae
- Subfamily: Boletobiinae
- Genus: Condate; Walker 1862

= Condate (moth) =

Genus of moths

Condate is a genus of moths of the family Erebidae.

== Taxonomy ==
The genus has previously been classified in the family Noctuidae.

== Species ==
- Condate angulina
- Condate arenacea
- Condate consocia
- Condate costiplagiata
- Condate fabularis
- Condate flexus
- Condate hypenoides
- Condate orsilla
- Condate purpurea
- Condate purpureorufa
- Condate retrahens
- Condate rufistigma
- Condate snelleni
