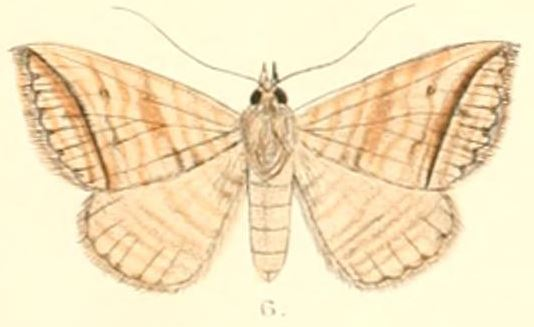
- Loxioda fasciosa

Scientific classification
- Domain: Eukaryota
- Kingdom: Animalia
- Phylum: Arthropoda
- Class: Insecta
- Order: Lepidoptera
- Superfamily: Noctuoidea
- Family: Erebidae
- Subfamily: Calpinae
- Genus: Loxioda; Warren, 1913

= Loxioda =

Genus of moths

Loxioda is a genus of moths of the family Erebidae. The genus was described by Warren in 1913.

== Species ==
- Loxioda alternans Hampson, 1926
- Loxioda coniventris Strand, 1915
- Loxioda dilutalis Snellen, 1884
- Loxioda dissimilis Moore, 1882
- Loxioda ectherma Hampson, 1926
- Loxioda fasciosa Moore, 1882
- Loxioda hampsoni Bethune-Baker, 1906
- Loxioda inamoena Filipjev, 1925
- Loxioda ochrota Hampson, 1909
- Loxioda oxyperas Hampson, 1926
- Loxioda shumara Swinhoe, 1901
- Loxioda similis Moore, 1882
