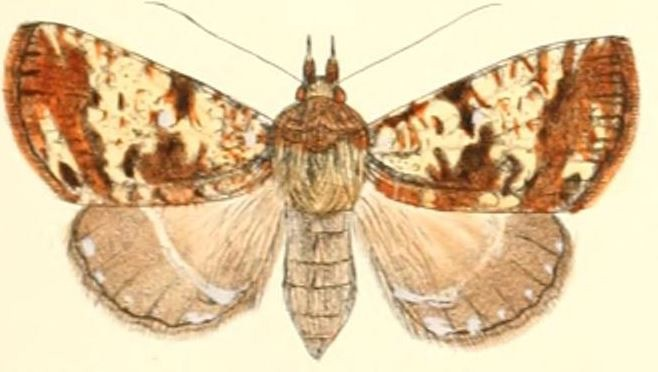
- Viridistria thoracica

Scientific classification
- Domain: Eukaryota
- Kingdom: Animalia
- Phylum: Arthropoda
- Class: Insecta
- Order: Lepidoptera
- Superfamily: Noctuoidea
- Family: Noctuidae
- Subfamily: Pantheinae
- Genus: Viridistria; Behounek & Kononenko, 2012

= Viridistria =

Genus of moths

Viridistria is a genus of moths of the family Noctuidae.

== Species ==
- Viridistria hollowayi Behounek & Kononenko, 2012 (Sumatra)
- Viridistria secreta Behounek & Kononenko, 2012 (Vietnam)
- Viridistria striatovirens (Moore, 1883) (India)
- Viridistria thoracica (Moore, 1882) (India)
- Viridistria viridipicta (Hampson, 1902) (India)
