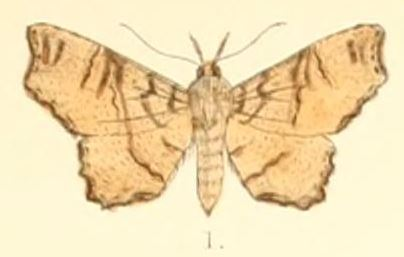

Scientific classification
- Kingdom: Animalia
- Phylum: Arthropoda
- Class: Insecta
- Order: Lepidoptera
- Superfamily: Noctuoidea
- Family: Erebidae
- Subfamily: Calpinae
- Genus: Cultripalpa; Guenée in Boisduval & Guenée, 1852

= Cultripalpa =

Genus of moths

Cultripalpa is a genus of moths of the family Erebidae.

== Species ==
- Cultripalpa lunulifera Hampson, 1926
- Cultripalpa partita Guenée, 1852
