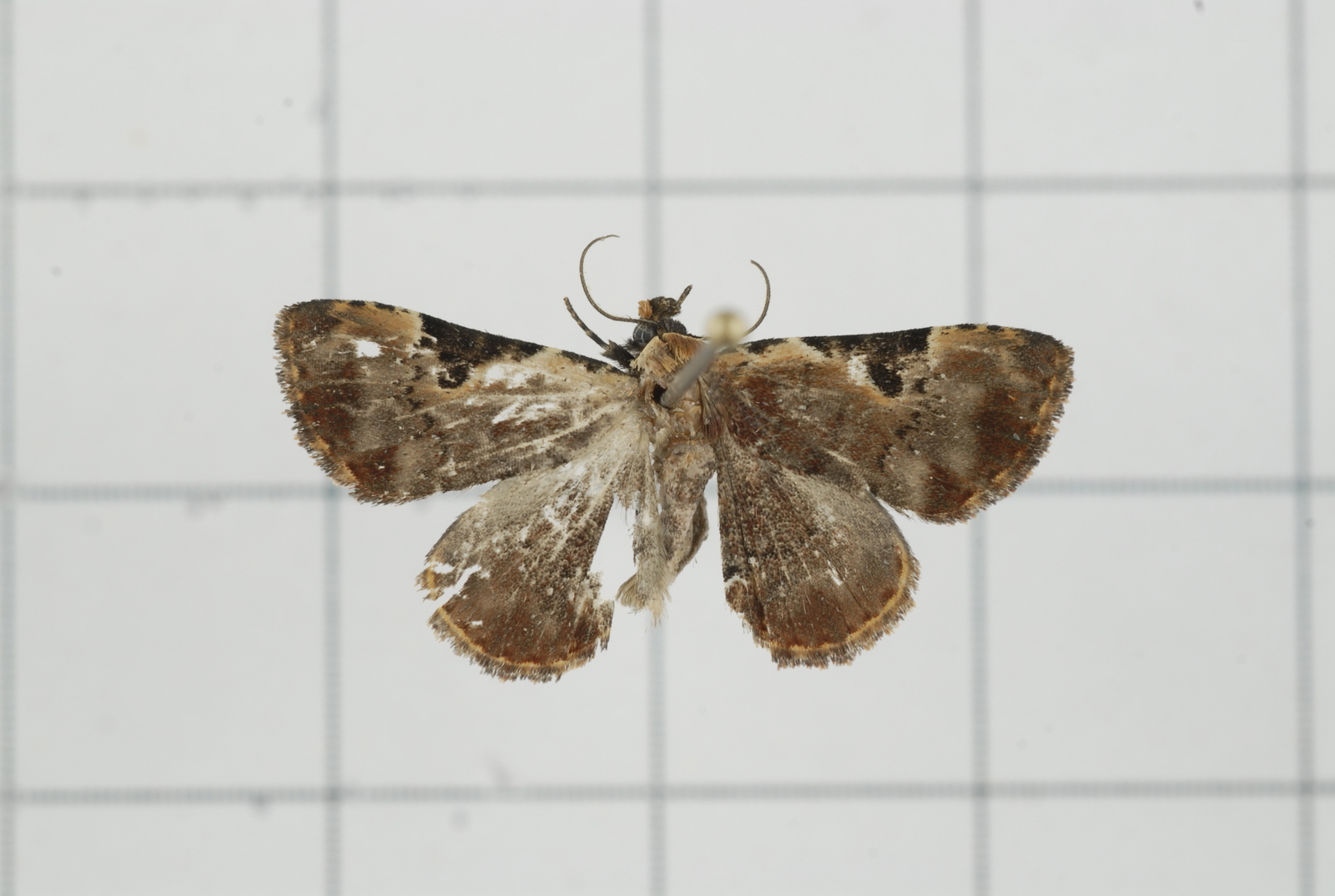

Scientific classification
- Kingdom: Animalia
- Phylum: Arthropoda
- Class: Insecta
- Order: Lepidoptera
- Superfamily: Noctuoidea
- Family: Erebidae
- Subfamily: Calpinae
- Genus: Diomea; Walker, 1858

Synonyms
- Zigera Walker, 1862; Heteroscotia Bryk, 1949

= Diomea =

Genus of moths

Diomea is a genus of moths of the family Erebidae erected by Francis Walker in 1858.

== Description ==
Second joint of palpi not reaching above vertex of head, but roughly scaled. Metathorax and proximal segments of abdomen with more or less prominent dorsal tufts. Forewings with more rounded apex. Hindwings with non-truncate anal angle.

== Species ==
From the Global Lepidoptera Names Index:

- Diomea absorbens Walker, [1863]
- Diomea dialitha Hampson, 1926
- Diomea diffusifascia Swinhoe, 1901
- Diomea discisigna Sugi, 1963
- Diomea eupsema Swinhoe, 1902
- Diomea fenella Robinson, 1969
- Diomea garroodi Holloway, 2005
- Diomea hirdi Holloway, 2005
- Diomea lignicolora Walker, [1858]
- Diomea nigrisuffusa Holloway, 2005
- Diomea orbifera Walker, 1862
- Diomea rotundata Walker, [1858]
- Diomea roydsi Holloway, 2005
- Diomea triangulata Holloway, 2005
- Diomea tricuspida Hampson, 1926
