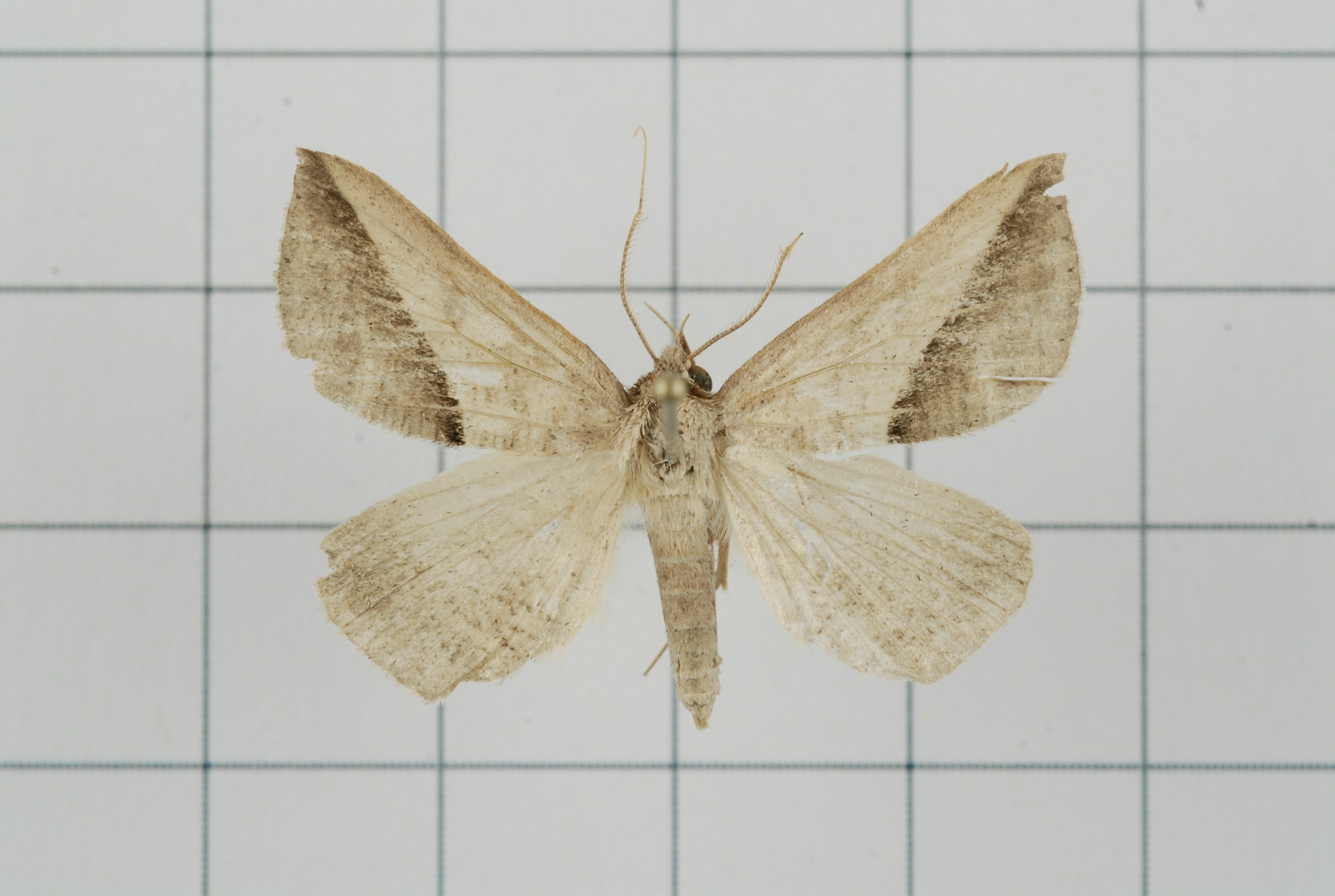

Scientific classification
- Kingdom: Animalia
- Phylum: Arthropoda
- Class: Insecta
- Order: Lepidoptera
- Superfamily: Noctuoidea
- Family: Erebidae
- Subfamily: Calpinae
- Genus: Dierna; Walker, 1859

Synonyms
- Nahara Walker, 1859

= Dierna =

Genus of moths

Dierna is a genus of moths of the family Erebidae erected by Francis Walker in 1859.

== Description ==
Palpi with second joint upcurved, slender and reaching above vertex of head. Third joint long and acute. Thorax and abdomen smoothly scaled and slender. Forewings with acute apex. Hindwings with short inner margin. Outer margin angled at vein 2. Vein 5 from near lower angle of cell.

== Species ==
These two species belong to the genus Dierna:

- Dierna patibulum Fabricius, 1794
- Dierna strigata Moore, 1867
