= Saroba maculicosta =

Scientific classification
- Kingdom: Animalia
- Phylum: Arthropoda
- Clade: Pancrustacea
- Class: Insecta
- Order: Lepidoptera
- Superfamily: Noctuoidea
- Family: Erebidae
- Genus: Saroba
- Species: S. maculicosta

Binomial name
- Saroba maculicosta (Walker, 1865)

Synonyms
- Capnodes? maculicosta Walker, 1858; Thermesia finipalpis Walker, 1858; Remigia zeta Walker, 1864; Capnodes finipalpis trimaculata Warren, 1903; Paranympha assimilis Rothschild, [1915] 1916; Saroba finipalpis Walker; Holloway, 1976

Species of moth

Saroba maculicosta is a moth of the family Noctuidae first described by Francis Walker in 1865. It is found in Sundaland, the Philippines, Papuan region to Solomon Islands and Sri Lanka.

Its wingspan is 4 cm. Forewings rich, dark, rusty brown with one small and two prominent white spots along each forewing costa.
