= Falana =

Scientific classification
- Domain: Eukaryota
- Kingdom: Animalia
- Phylum: Arthropoda
- Class: Insecta
- Order: Lepidoptera
- Superfamily: Noctuoidea
- Family: Erebidae
- Subfamily: Calpinae
- Genus: Falana; Moore, 1882

Genus of moths

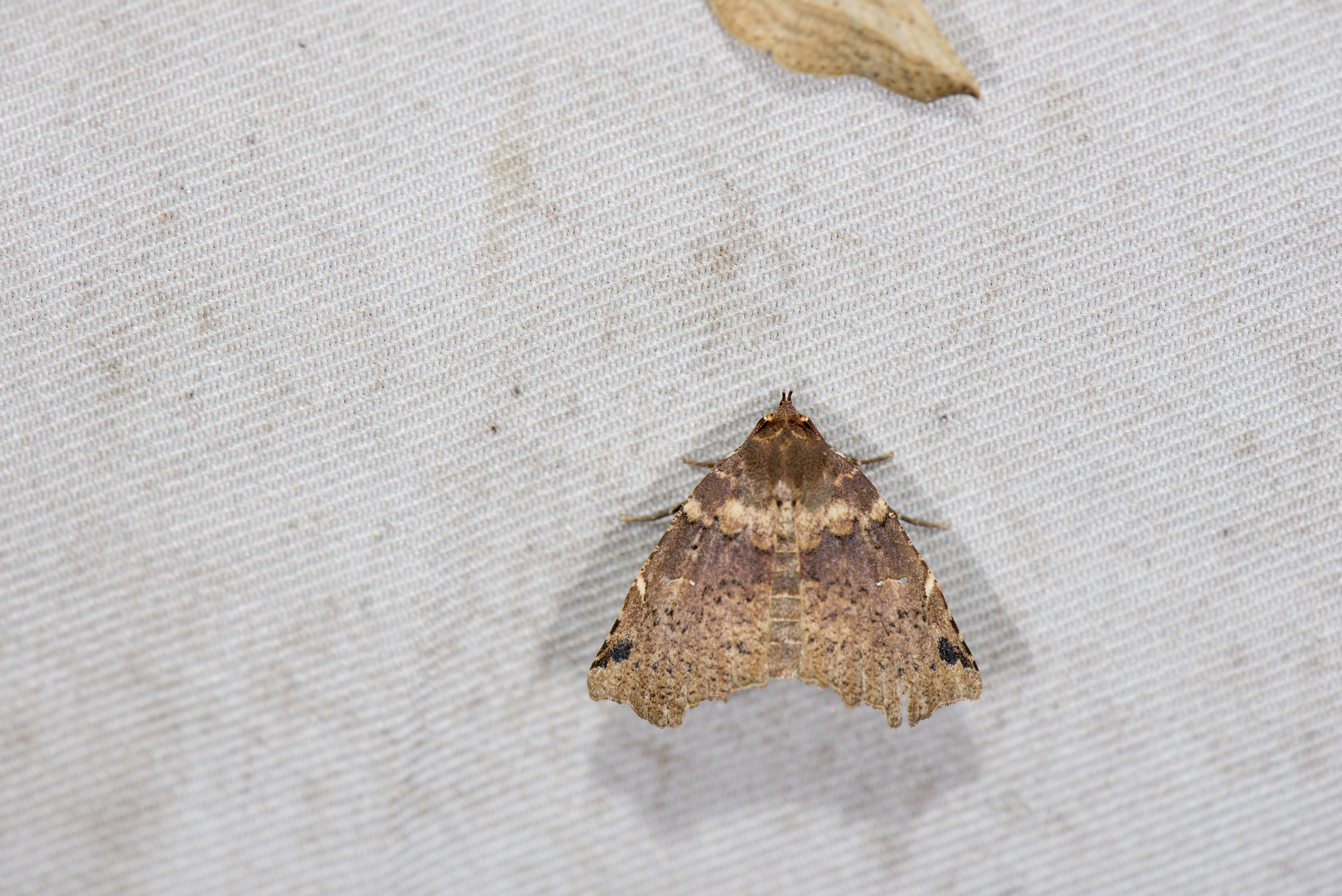
The falana sordid moth

Falana is a genus of moths of the family Erebidae. The genus was erected by Frederic Moore in 1882.

== Description ==
Palpi upturned, where the second joint reaching vertex of the head and third joint long and naked. Antennae bipectinated (comb like on both sides) in the male with short branches. Metathorax with slight tufts. Abdomen with a dorsal tuft on the first segment, keeled below, with pairs of flattened scale-like plates. Femur with scaly tufts at the base. Fore tibia hairy, mid and hind tibia with medial and distal tufts. Forewings with an acute apex. Outer margin excised below apex and produced to a rounded lobe at center and point at vein 2. A tuft of scales forming a boss can be seen at the base above inner margin. Areole very small. Vein 6 from some way below the angle of cell. Hindwings with arched costa at the base. Veins 3 and 4 on a short stalk and vein 5 from below center of discocellulars.

== Species ==
- Falana bilineata Holloway, 2005
- Falana sordida Moore, 1882
