= Cultripalpa lunulifera =

Scientific classification
- Kingdom: Animalia
- Phylum: Arthropoda
- Class: Insecta
- Order: Lepidoptera
- Superfamily: Noctuoidea
- Family: Erebidae
- Genus: Cultripalpa
- Species: C. lunulifera

Binomial name
- Cultripalpa lunulifera Hampson, 1926

Species of moth

Cultripalpa lunulifera is a species of moth of the family Erebidae.

== Distribution ==
It is found in Malaysia, Singapore, Thailand and Indochina.
