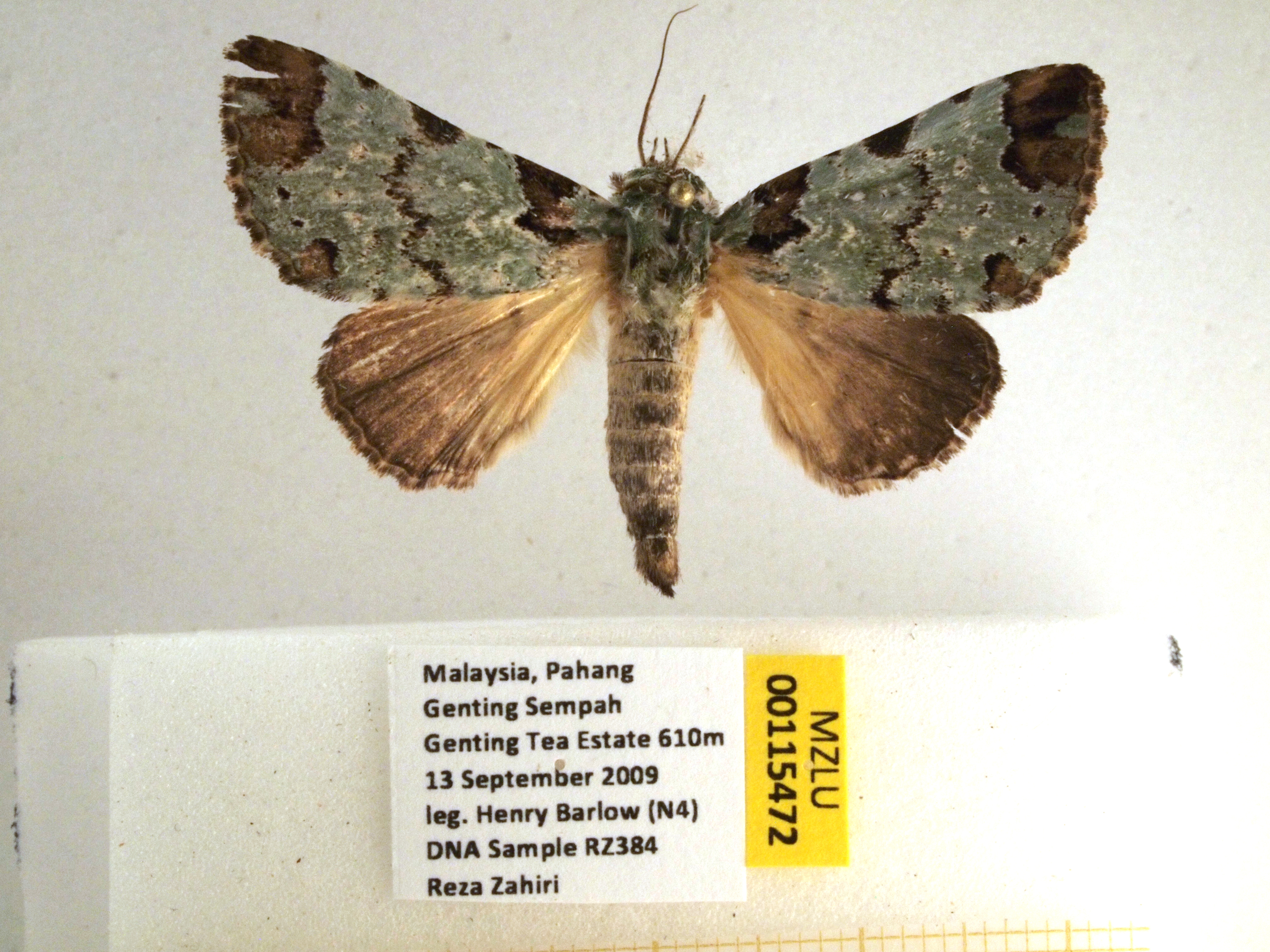

Scientific classification
- Kingdom: Animalia
- Phylum: Arthropoda
- Clade: Pancrustacea
- Class: Insecta
- Order: Lepidoptera
- Superfamily: Noctuoidea
- Family: Erebidae
- Genus: Belciana
- Species: B. biformis

Binomial name
- Belciana biformis Walker, 1858

Synonyms
- Dandaca biformis Walker, 1858

= Belciana biformis =

Species of moth

Belciana biformis is a moth of the family Noctuidae first described by Francis Walker in 1858.

== Distribution ==
It is found in India, Sri Lanka, Andaman Islands, Nicobar Islands, Malaysia, Borneo, Thailand, Vietnam, Philippines, Sumatra, Java, and Papua New Guinea.

== Biology ==
The species' wingspan is 37–43 mm.

Its caterpillars are known to feed on Shorea maximi, Grewia tiliaefolia and Heritiera species.
