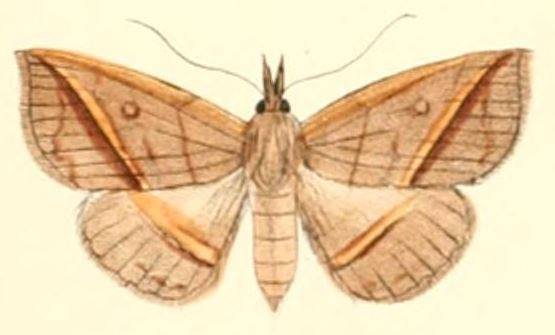
- Talapoptera duplexa

Scientific classification
- Kingdom: Animalia
- Phylum: Arthropoda
- Class: Insecta
- Order: Lepidoptera
- Superfamily: Noctuoidea
- Family: Erebidae
- Subfamily: Calpinae
- Genus: Talapoptera; Hampson, 1926
- Species: T. duplexa

Binomial name
- Talapoptera duplexa (Moore, 1882)

Synonyms
- Talpa confluens Hampson 1898; Iluza complexa Moore, 1882

= Talapoptera =

Genus of moths

Talapoptera is a monotypic moth genus of the family Erebidae erected by George Hampson in 1926.

The only species in this genus, Talapoptera duplexa, first described by Frederic Moore in 1882, is known from India.
