= Marapana =

Scientific classification
- Kingdom: Animalia
- Phylum: Arthropoda
- Clade: Pancrustacea
- Class: Insecta
- Order: Lepidoptera
- Superfamily: Noctuoidea
- Family: Erebidae
- Subfamily: Calpinae
- Genus: Marapana; Moore, [1885]

Genus of moths

Marapana is a genus of moths of the family Erebidae. The genus was erected by Frederic Moore in 1885.

== Species ==
- Marapana angulata Bethune-Baker, 1908 New Guinea
- Marapana indistincta Rothschild, 1915 New Guinea
- Marapana pulverata (Guenée, 1852) India, Sri Lanka, Java, New Guinea
