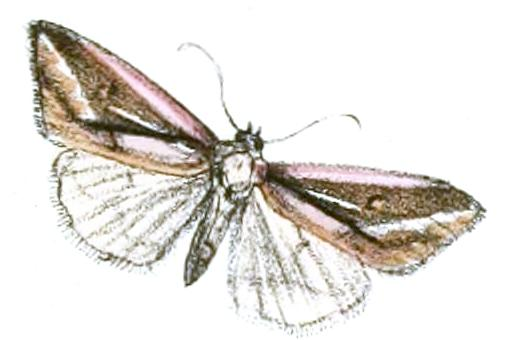

Scientific classification
- Domain: Eukaryota
- Kingdom: Animalia
- Phylum: Arthropoda
- Class: Insecta
- Order: Lepidoptera
- Superfamily: Noctuoidea
- Family: Noctuidae
- Genus: Micardia
- Species: M. pulcherrima

Binomial name
- Micardia pulcherrima (Moore, 1867)

Synonyms
- Leucania pulcherrima Moore, 1867; Eustrotia pulcherrima

= Micardia pulcherrima =

Species of moth

Micardia pulcherrima is a species of moth of the family Noctuidae. It is found in Bhutan, China (Tibet) and India.
