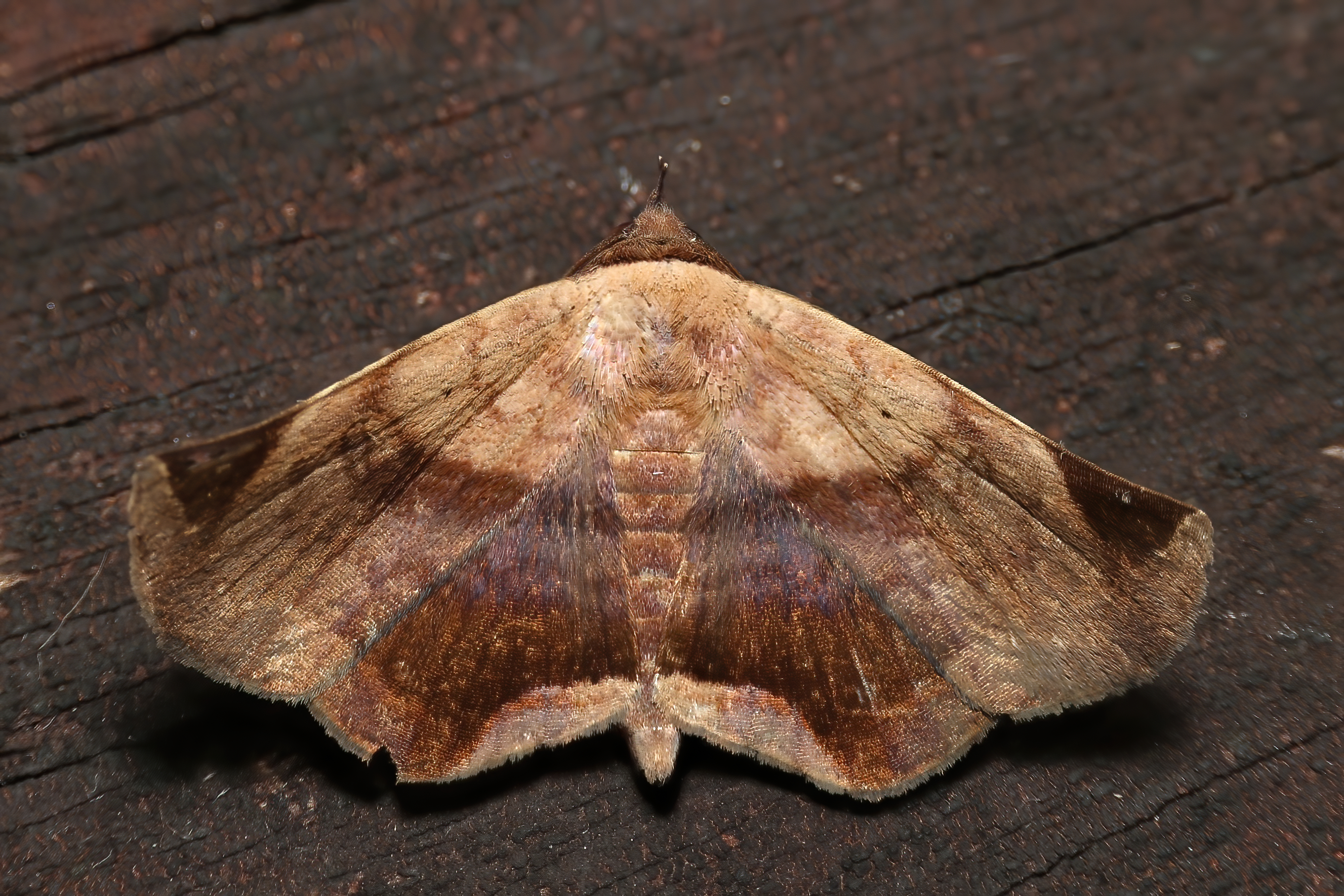
- in Sri Lanka

Scientific classification
- Kingdom: Animalia
- Phylum: Arthropoda
- Class: Insecta
- Order: Lepidoptera
- Superfamily: Noctuoidea
- Family: Erebidae
- Subfamily: Calpinae
- Genus: Psimada; Walker, 1858
- Species: P. quadripennis

Binomial name
- Psimada quadripennis Walker, 1858

Synonyms
- Sanys javana Felder & Rogenhofer, 1874

= Psimada =

Genus of moths

Psimada is a monotypic moth genus of the family Noctuidae. Its only species, Psimada quadripennis, is found in the Indian subregion, southern China, Taiwan, Myanmar, Thailand, Sri Lanka, the Andaman Islands, Sundaland, Sulawesi and Seram. Both the genus and species were first described by Francis Walker in 1858.

== Description ==
=== Genus ===
Third joint of the palpi being short. Antennae of male ciliated, where the medial portion thickened by a ridge of scales on upper surface. Hindwings with angled outer margin at middle.

=== Species ===
Its wingspan is about 42 mm. Head and collar reddish brown. Thorax paler. Abdomen fuscous. Forewings with pale red-brown basal half and outer dark with a purplish tinged. There are traces of antemedial, medial, and postmedial waved lines and submarginal series of white specks present. A large triangular dark red brown patch can be seen on the costa at the apex. Hindwings dark with a purplish tinge on the basal half. The outer half redder with a large semi-circular pale patch on outer margin towards the anal angle. Ventral side with apex of forewing whitish and with a submarginal oblique line.

Larva darkish grass green with paler extremities. Head very pale, dull, and greenish white. Spiracles are orange with white rims. The larvae feed on Ficus species. The pupa lacks a bloom.
