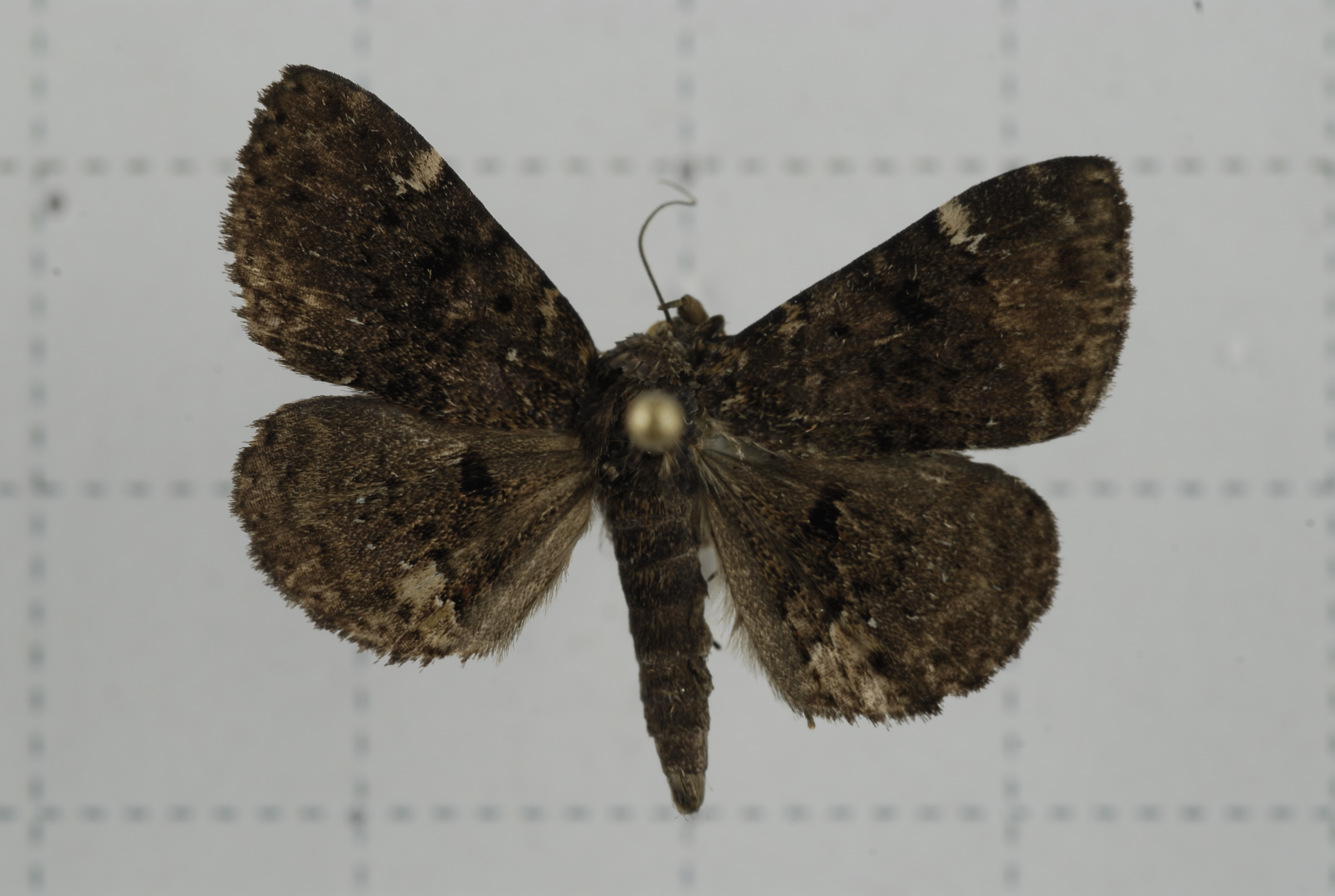
- Diomea rotundata, Erebidae (Noctuidae)

Scientific classification
- Kingdom: Animalia
- Phylum: Arthropoda
- Clade: Pancrustacea
- Class: Insecta
- Order: Lepidoptera
- Superfamily: Noctuoidea
- Family: Erebidae
- Genus: Diomea
- Species: D. rotundata

Binomial name
- Diomea rotundata Walker, 1857

= Diomea rotundata =

Species of moth

Diomea rotundata is a moth of the family Noctuidae first described by Francis Walker in 1857. It is found in Sri Lanka, the Indian subregion, Taiwan, Sumatra, Borneo, the Philippines and Sumba.
