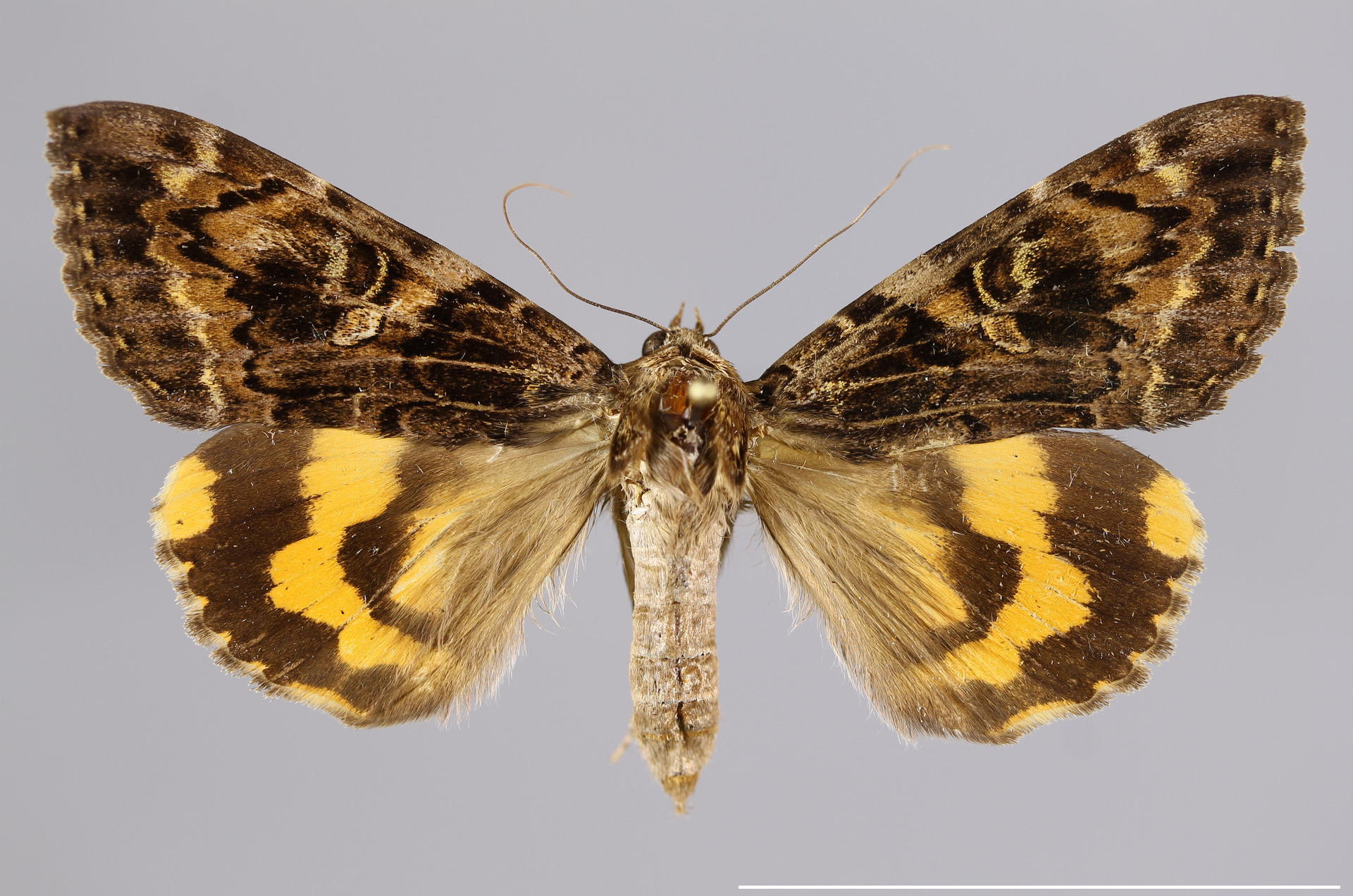

Scientific classification
- Kingdom: Animalia
- Phylum: Arthropoda
- Class: Insecta
- Order: Lepidoptera
- Superfamily: Noctuoidea
- Family: Erebidae
- Genus: Catocala
- Species: C. tapestrina

Binomial name
- Catocala tapestrina Moore, 1882

= Catocala tapestrina =

Species of moth

Catocala tapestrina is a moth of the family Erebidae first described by Frederic Moore in 1882. It is found in China, Bhutan, Nepal and in India.

== Subspecies ==
- Catocala tapestrina tapestrina Moore, 1882 (from India)
- Catocala tapestrina forresti Mell, 1939 (from China)
