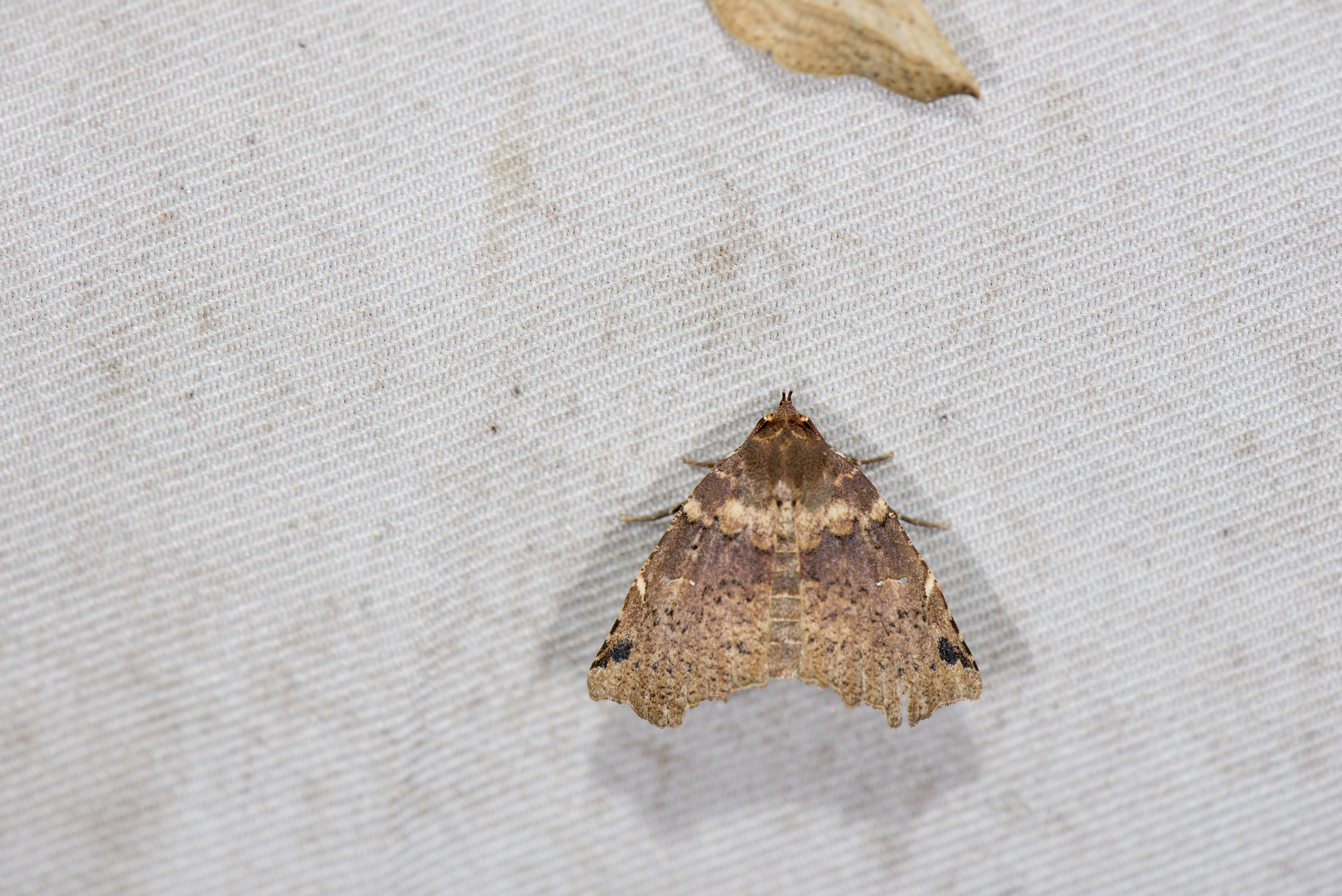

Scientific classification
- Kingdom: Animalia
- Phylum: Arthropoda
- Clade: Pancrustacea
- Class: Insecta
- Order: Lepidoptera
- Superfamily: Noctuoidea
- Family: Erebidae
- Genus: Falana
- Species: F. sordida

Binomial name
- Falana sordida Moore, 1882

= Falana sordida =

Species of moth

Falana sordida is a moth of the family Noctuidae first described by Frederic Moore in 1882.

== Distribution ==
It is found in the Indian subregion, Sri Lanka, Vietnam, Thailand, Taiwan, South China, Peninsular Malaysia, Sumatra, Bali and Borneo.
