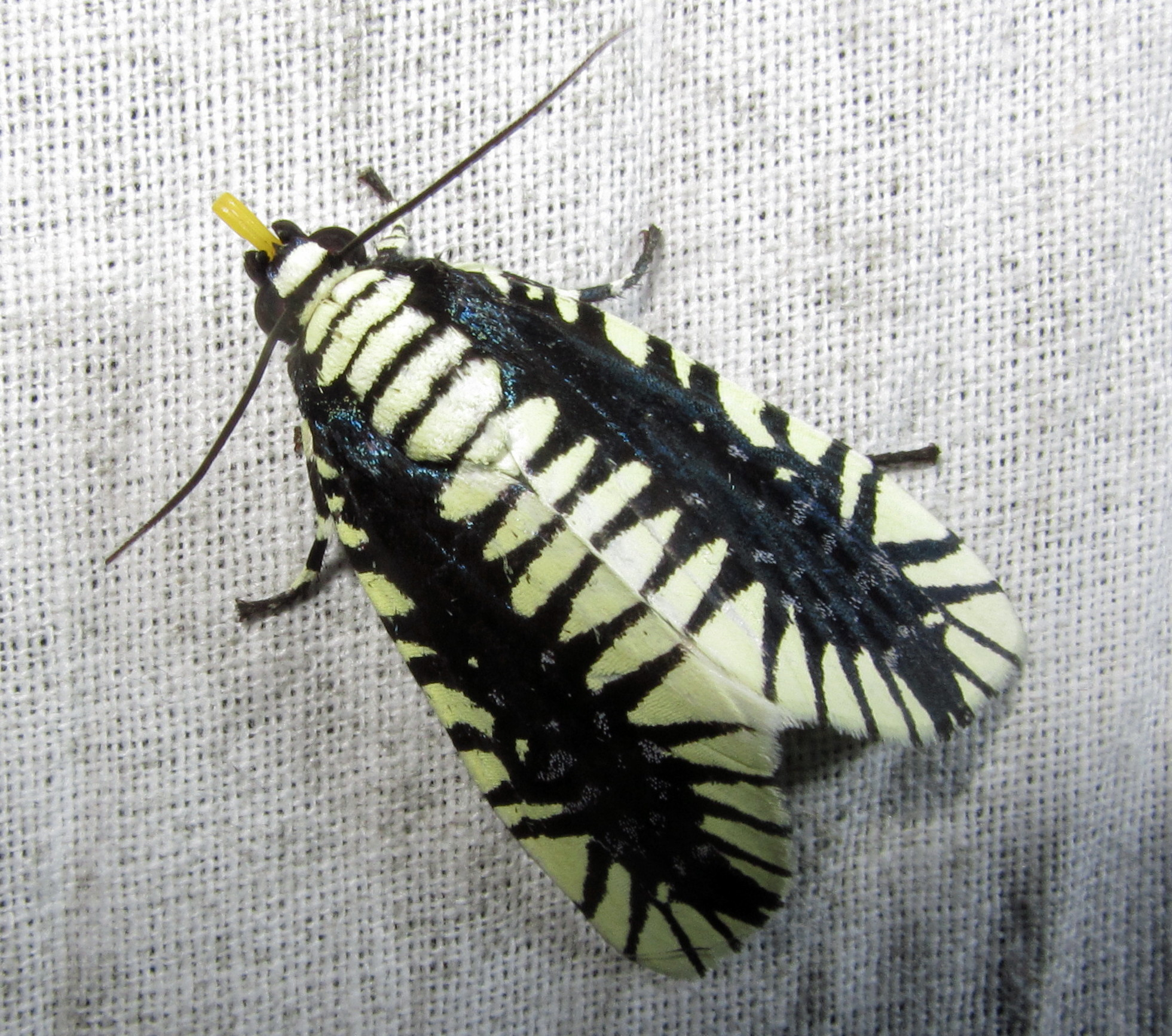

Scientific classification
- Kingdom: Animalia
- Phylum: Arthropoda
- Class: Insecta
- Order: Lepidoptera
- Superfamily: Noctuoidea
- Family: Noctuidae
- Genus: Apsarasa
- Species: A. radians

Binomial name
- Apsarasa radians (Westwood, 1848)

Synonyms
- Noctua radians Westwood, 1848; Apsarasa figurata Moore, 1877; Apsarasa nigrotarsata Grünberg, 1911; Apsarasa dajakana Grünberg, 1911

= Apsarasa radians =

Species of moth

Apsarasa radians is a moth of the family Noctuidae first described by John O. Westwood in 1848. It is found in the north-eastern parts of the Himalayas, south-eastern Asia, the Andamans, Peninsular Malaysia, Sumatra, Borneo, the Philippines and Sulawesi. Apsarasa radians most frequently have been known to prefer lowland forest areas with an average rainfall intensity between 1000m and 1200m.
