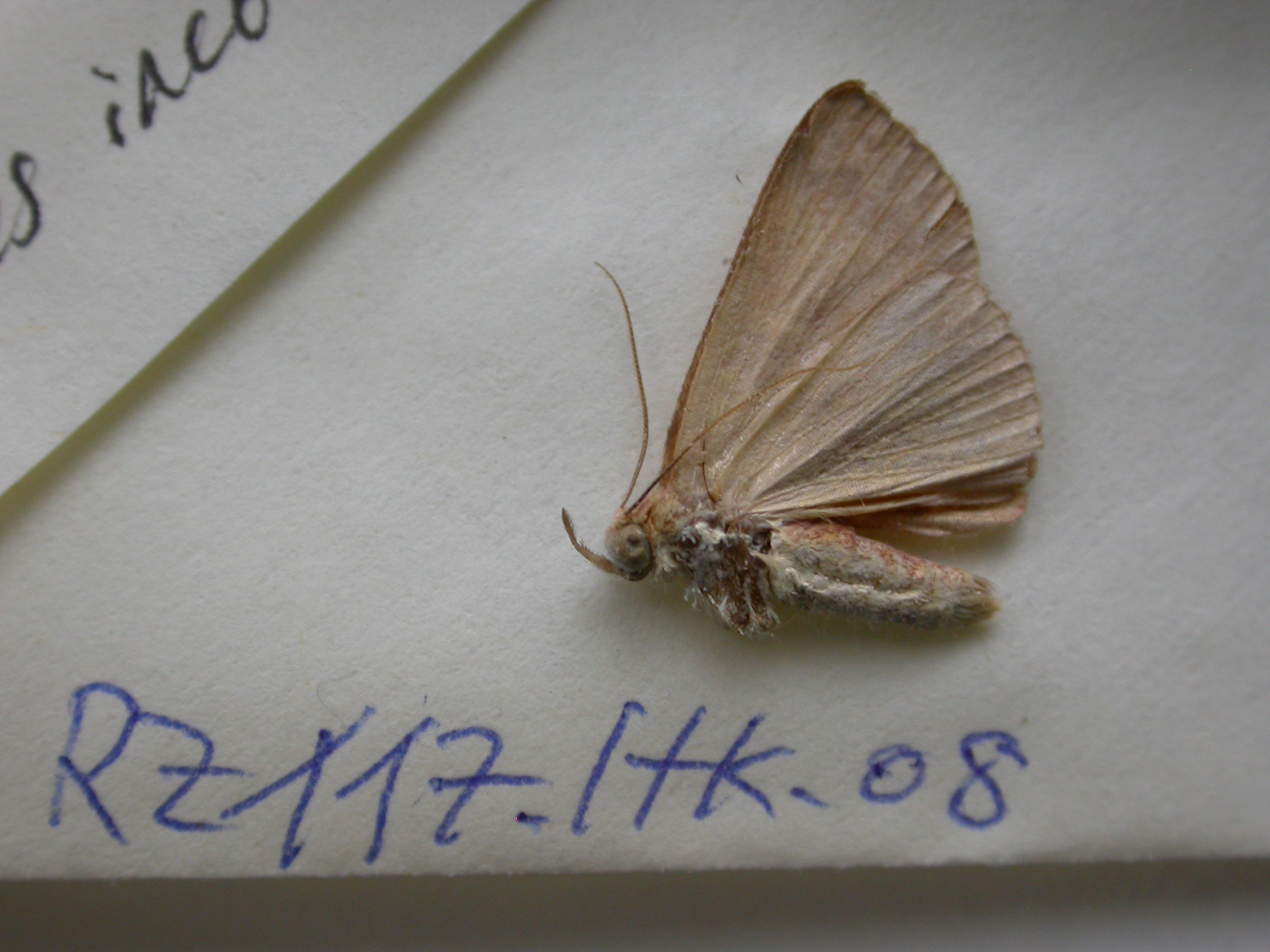

Scientific classification
- Kingdom: Animalia
- Phylum: Arthropoda
- Class: Insecta
- Order: Lepidoptera
- Superfamily: Noctuoidea
- Family: Erebidae
- Subfamily: Calpinae
- Genus: Sarobides; Hampson, 1926
- Species: S. inconclusa

Binomial name
- Sarobides inconclusa (Walker, [1863])

Synonyms
- Cosmophila inconclusa Walker, [1863]; Capnodes rufescens Moore, 1877

= Sarobides =

Genus of moths

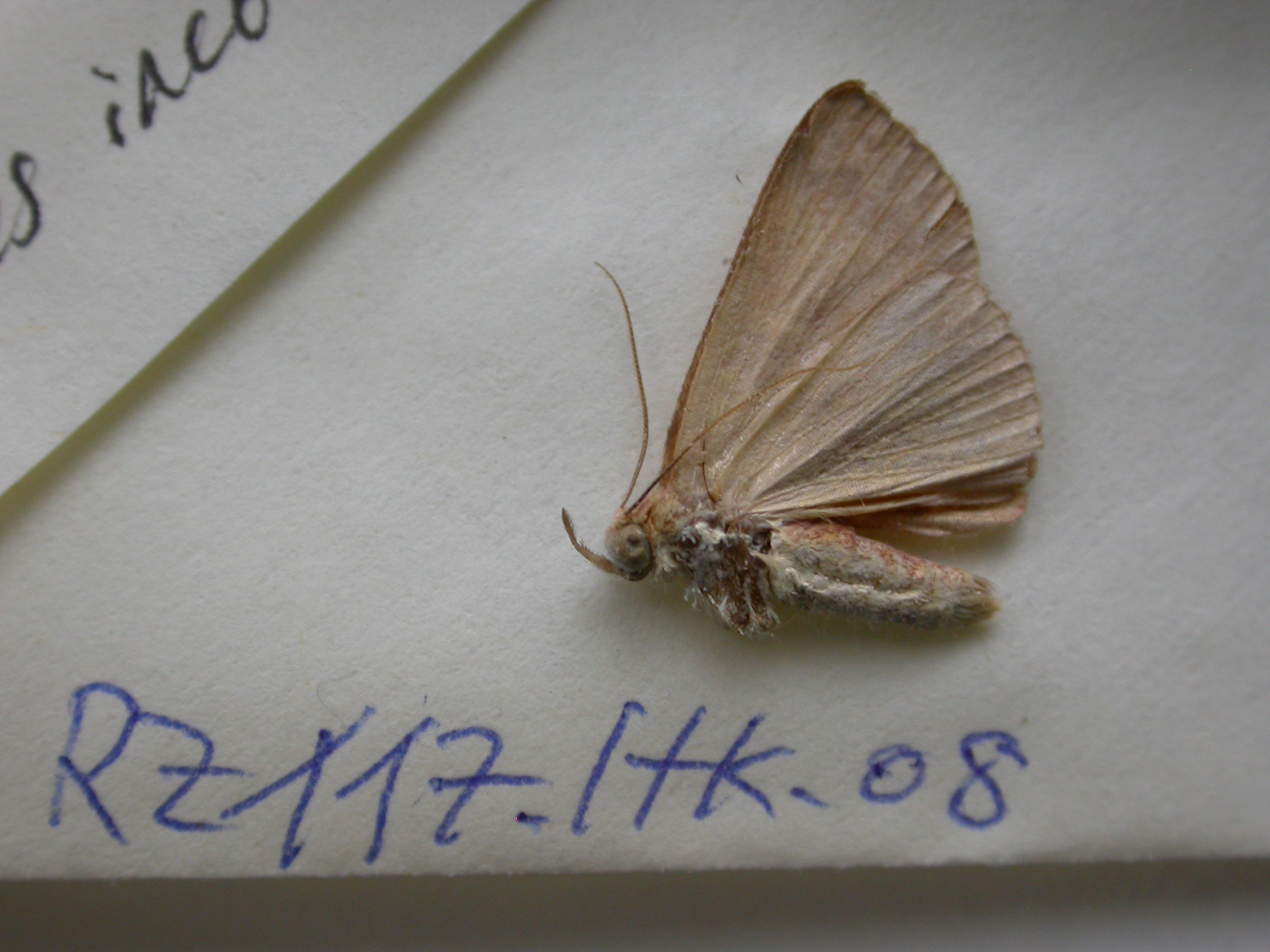

Sarobides is a monotypic moth genus of the family Erebidae erected by George Hampson in 1926. Its only species, Sarobides inconclusa, was first described by Francis Walker in 1863. It is found in the north-east Himalayas, Myanmar, from Sundaland to New Guinea and in the Solomon Islands.
