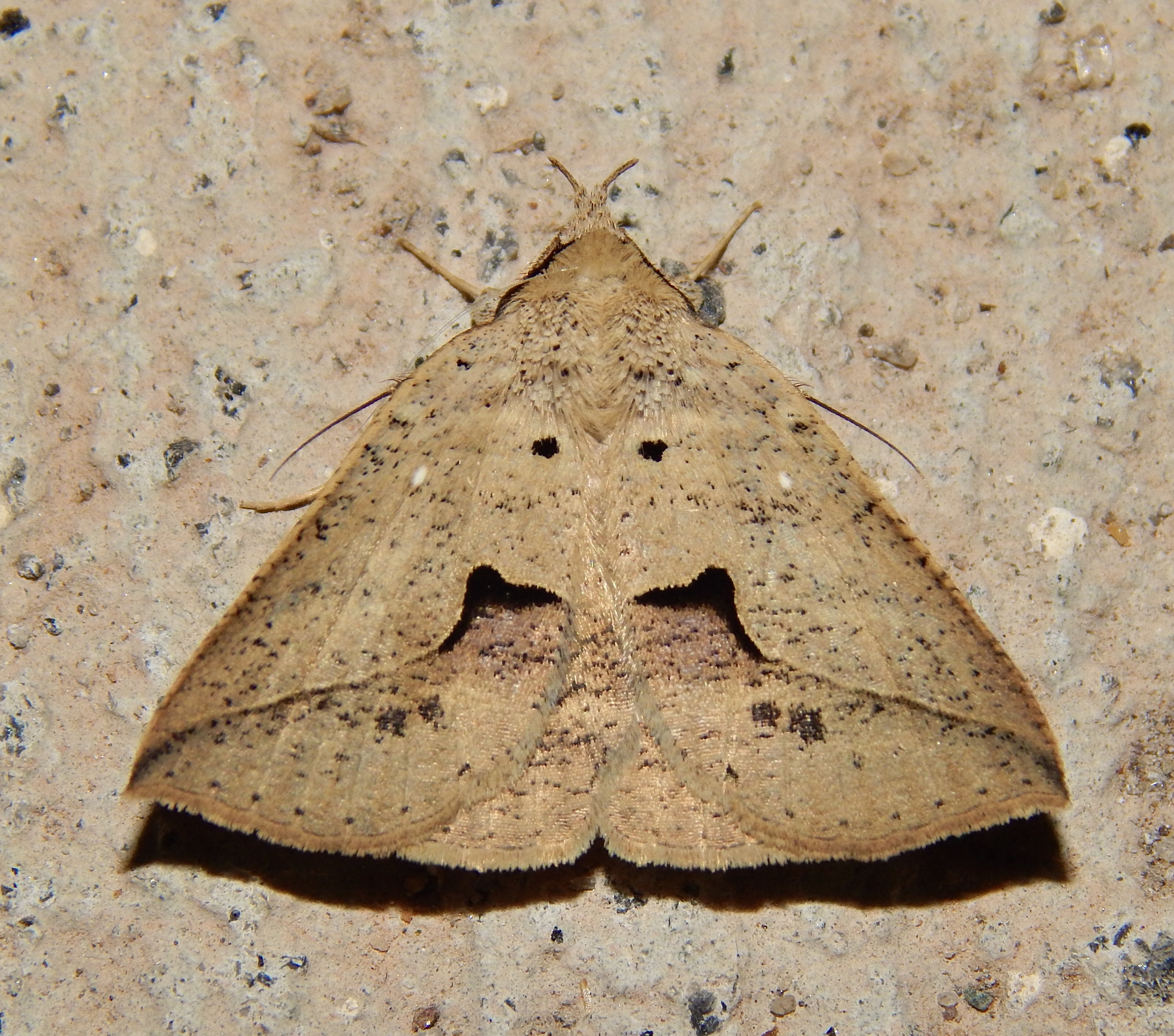

Scientific classification
- Domain: Eukaryota
- Kingdom: Animalia
- Phylum: Arthropoda
- Class: Insecta
- Order: Lepidoptera
- Superfamily: Noctuoidea
- Family: Erebidae
- Subfamily: Calpinae
- Genus: Dierna
- Species: D. patibulum

Binomial name
- Dierna patibulum Fabricius, 1794

= Dierna patibulum =

Species of moth

Dierna patibulum is a moth of the family Noctuidae first described by Johan Christian Fabricius in 1794. It is found in Sri Lanka.
