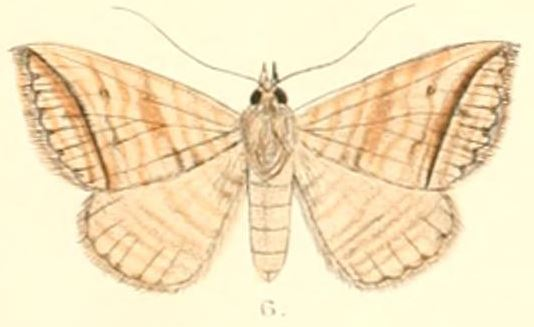

Scientific classification
- Domain: Eukaryota
- Kingdom: Animalia
- Phylum: Arthropoda
- Class: Insecta
- Order: Lepidoptera
- Superfamily: Noctuoidea
- Family: Erebidae
- Genus: Loxioda
- Species: L. fasciosa

Binomial name
- Loxioda fasciosa (Moore, 1882)

Synonyms
- Phurys fasciosa Moore, 1882

= Loxioda fasciosa =

Species of moth

Loxioda fasciosa is a moth of the family Noctuidae. It is found in India.
