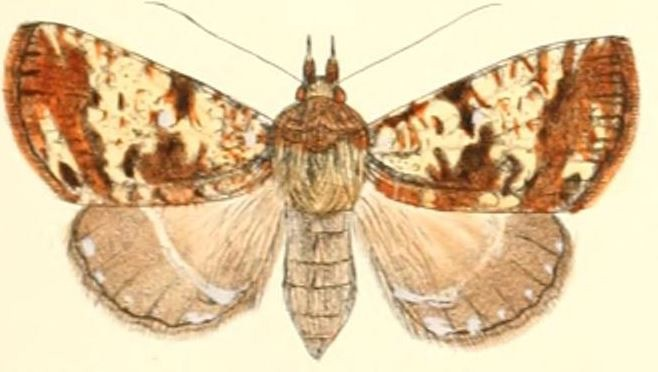

Scientific classification
- Domain: Eukaryota
- Kingdom: Animalia
- Phylum: Arthropoda
- Class: Insecta
- Order: Lepidoptera
- Superfamily: Noctuoidea
- Family: Noctuidae
- Genus: Viridistria
- Species: V. thoracica

Binomial name
- Viridistria thoracica (Moore, 1882)

Synonyms
- Donda thoracica Moore, 1882

= Viridistria thoracica =

Species of moth

Viridistria thoracica is a moth of the family Noctuidae first described by Frederic Moore in 1882. It is found in northern India.
