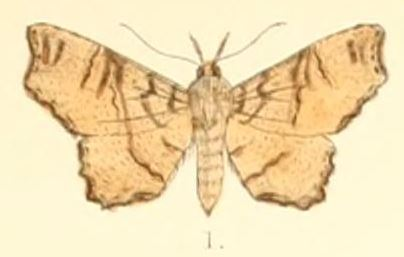

Scientific classification
- Kingdom: Animalia
- Phylum: Arthropoda
- Class: Insecta
- Order: Lepidoptera
- Superfamily: Noctuoidea
- Family: Erebidae
- Genus: Cultripalpa
- Species: C. partita

Binomial name
- Cultripalpa partita Guenée, 1852

Synonyms
- Cultripalpa trifasciata Moore, 1882; Cultripalpa indistincta Moore, 1882; Cultripalpa dodara Swinhoe, 1915

= Cultripalpa partita =

Species of moth

Cultripalpa partita is a species of moth of the family Erebidae first described by Achille Guenée in 1852.

== Distribution ==
It is found from India, the Seychelles to Japan, Malaysia, Philippines, Australia and Vietnam.
