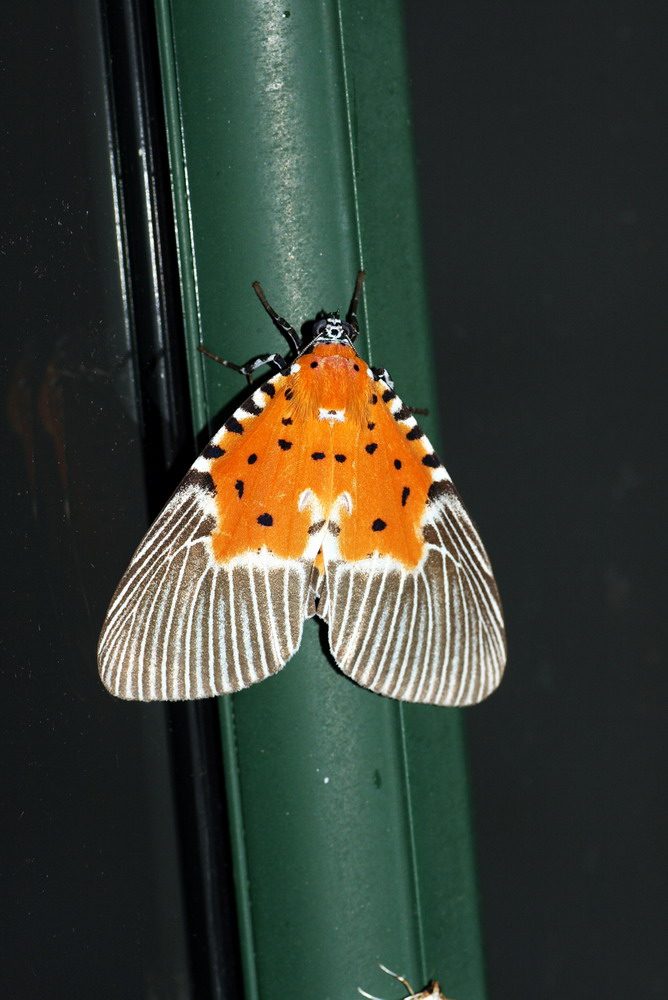

Scientific classification
- Kingdom: Animalia
- Phylum: Arthropoda
- Class: Insecta
- Order: Lepidoptera
- Superfamily: Noctuoidea
- Family: Erebidae
- Genus: Peridrome
- Species: P. orbicularis

Binomial name
- Peridrome orbicularis (Walker, 1854)

Synonyms
- Hypsa orbicularis Walker, 1854; Eriocrypta longipennis Herrich-Schaffer, 1856; Aganopis subquadrata Herrich-Schaffer, 1856

= Peridrome orbicularis =

Species of moth

Peridrome orbicularis is a species of moth in the family Erebidae. The species is found in Bangladesh (Silhet), Cambodia, India (Andaman Islands, Assam and Meghalaya), Indonesia (Java, Sumatra, Sumbawa, Sulawesi, Borneo), Laos, Malaysia (Pinang), Myanmar, the Philippines (Luzon, Palawan, Mindanao and Mindoro), Thailand and Vietnam.

The wingspan is about 67 mm for males and 71 mm for females.

The larvae have been recorded on Apocynaceae species.
