= Acronicta pruinosa =

Scientific classification
- Kingdom: Animalia
- Phylum: Arthropoda
- Clade: Pancrustacea
- Class: Insecta
- Order: Lepidoptera
- Superfamily: Noctuoidea
- Family: Noctuidae
- Genus: Acronicta
- Species: A. pruinosa

Binomial name
- Acronicta pruinosa (Guenée, 1852)

Synonyms
- Acronycta pruinosa Guenée, 1852; Polio soluta Walker, 1865; Acronycta consanguis Butler, 1879; Acronycta albiorbis Hampson, 1909; Acronycta crenulata Bethune-Baker, 1906; Acronicta crenulata (Bethune-Baker, 1906)

Species of moth

Acronicta pruinosa is a moth of the family Noctuidae. It is found in Sri Lanka, the Himalaya, east to Japan and Taiwan south to Myanmar and Peninsular Malaysia, Borneo, Java and New Guinea.

== Description ==
The wingspan is 44 mm in the male and 46 mm in the female. Palpi upturned in both sexes, and possess a short third joint. In male, head and thorax greyish white. Thorax clothed with scales. Abdomen whitish, with ochreous tinge at base, where fuscous towards extremity. Forewings whitish grey, with sub-basal and antemedial indistinct double lines present. Orbicular large, round, white, whereas reniform with black outline, its inner margin double. Postmedial double lunulate line filled with white and incurved at vein 2 and with fuscous suffused beyond it. There is a series of small marginal lunules can be seen. Cilia chequered fuscous and white. Hindwings slightly whitish suffused with fuscous, and with traces of a postmedial line. Underside with a cell-spot and a patch on costa above it with a maculate postmedial line. In female, hindwings are fuscous brown, forewings similar to male.

Larva yellow with black spots. First abdominal segment with a median dorsal rounded protuberance close covered apically with short black hairs. Head and prothoracic shield are brown. The larvae feed on Elaeagnus species.
