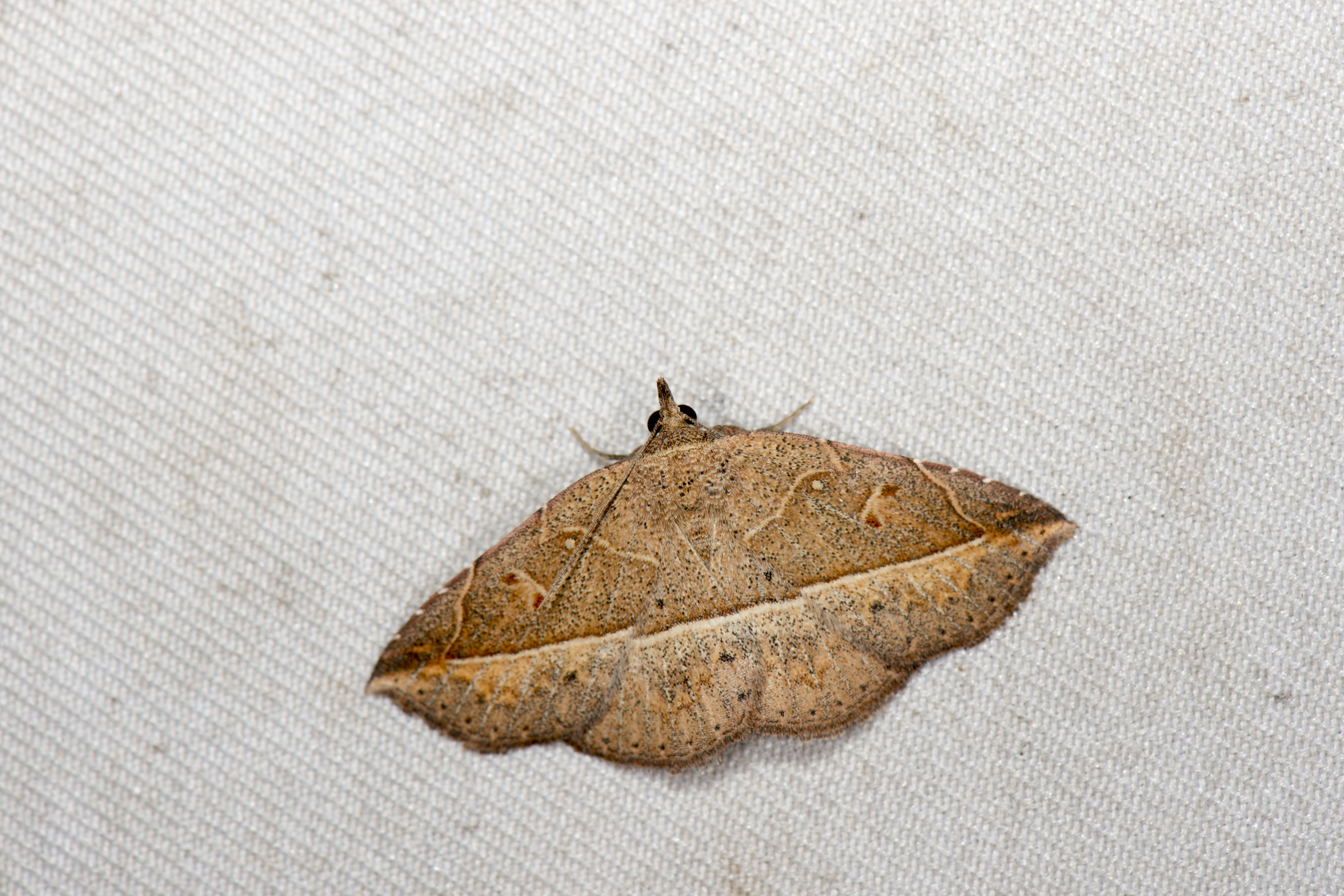
- Condate angulina

Scientific classification
- Domain: Eukaryota
- Kingdom: Animalia
- Phylum: Arthropoda
- Class: Insecta
- Order: Lepidoptera
- Superfamily: Noctuoidea
- Family: Erebidae
- Genus: Condate
- Species: C. angulina

Binomial name
- Condate angulina (Guenée,1852)

Synonyms
- Sanys angulina Guenée, 1852; Thermesia arenacea Walker,1865; Thermesia consocia Walker,1865; Thermesia retrahens Walker,1865

= Condate angulina =

Species of moth

Condate angulina is a moth in the family Erebidae. It is found in Asia, with records from India, Bangladesh, Malaysia, Taiwan, Borneo, and Thailand. It is a small moth, though larger than its congeners.
