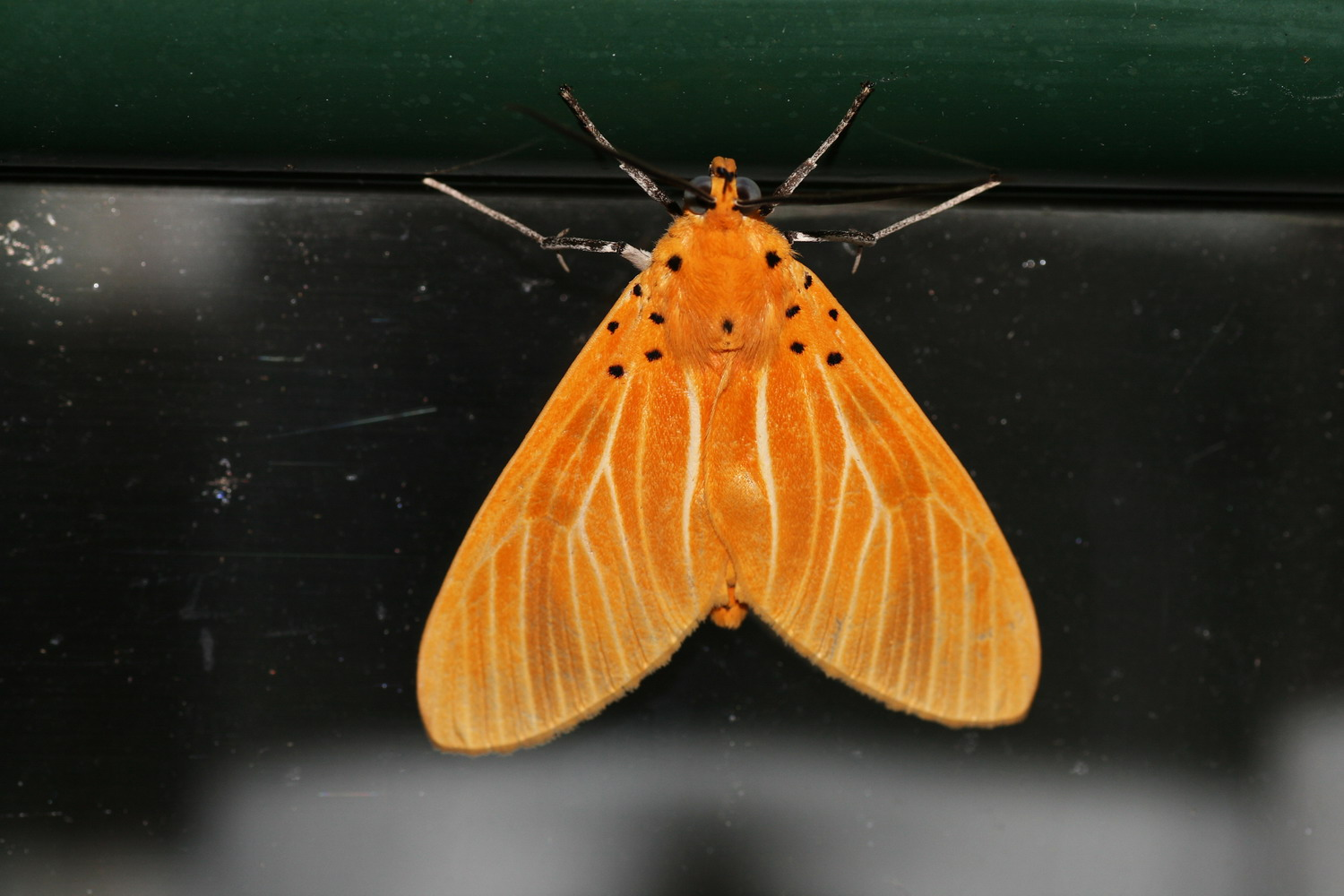

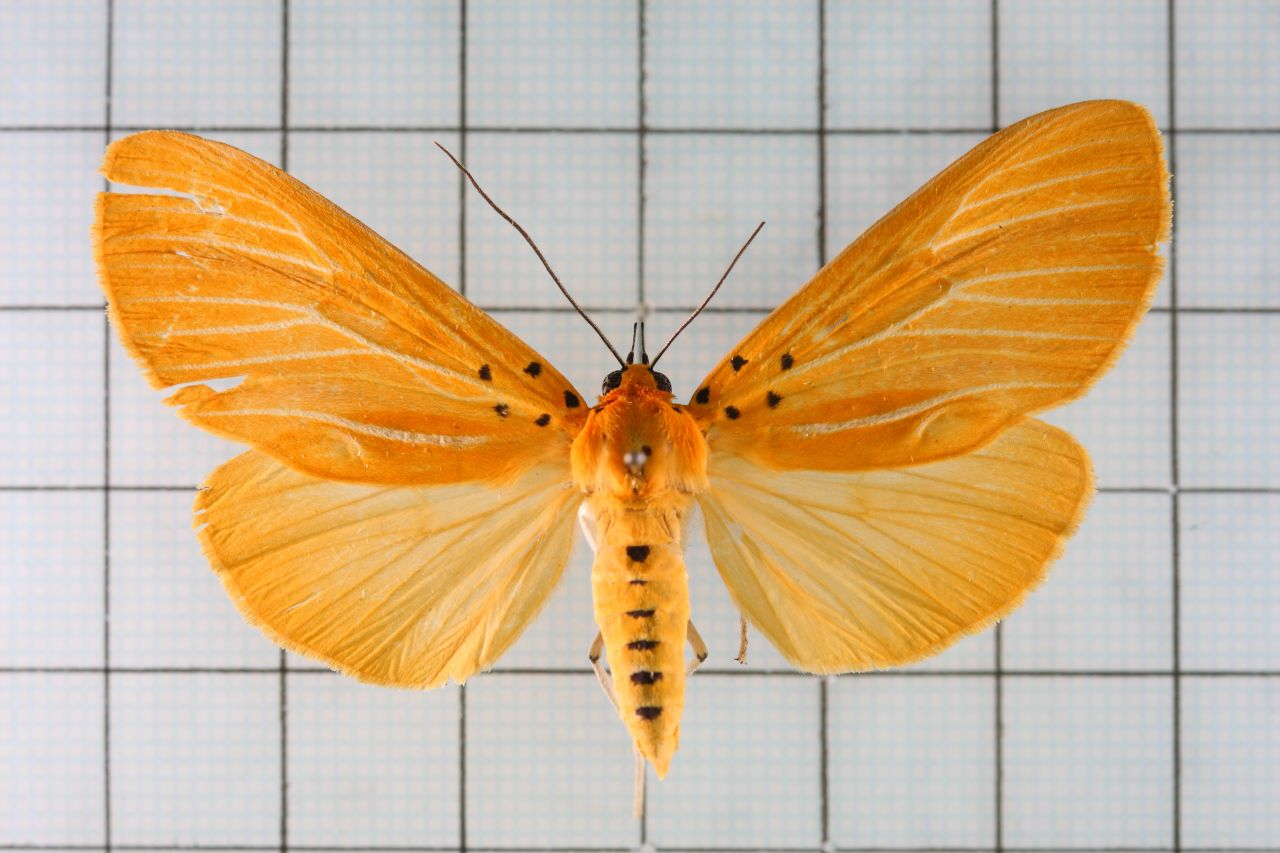

Scientific classification
- Kingdom: Animalia
- Phylum: Arthropoda
- Class: Insecta
- Order: Lepidoptera
- Superfamily: Noctuoidea
- Family: Erebidae
- Genus: Asota
- Species: A. egens

Binomial name
- Asota egens (Walker, 1854)

Synonyms
- Hypsa egens Walker, 1854; Hypsa nebulosa Butler, 1875; Asota biformis Rothschild, 1897; Asota indica Jordan 1897; Asota celebensis Tams, 1935; (nec. Hopfer 1874)

= Asota egens =

Species of moth

Asota egens is a species of noctuoid moths in the family Erebidae. It is found from Japan and the Oriental tropics, east to New Guinea.

The wingspan is 54–60 mm.

The larvae have been recorded on Ficus species.

== Subspecies ==
- Asota egens andamana (Andaman Islands)
- Asota egens confinis (Philippines: Luzon, Mindanao and Sibuyan island)
- Asota egens egens (China, India, Indonesia, Japan, Peninsula Malaysia, Philippines, Singapore, Taiwan, Thailand and Vietnam)
- Asota egens indica (India)
- Asota egens intermissa (Indonesia)
- Asota egens inversa (Indonesia)
- Asota egens macrosticta (Enggano)
- Asota egens nebulosa (Borneo)
- Asota egens onusta (Nias)
- Asota egens reducta (Philippines: Palawan, Mindoro)
- Asota egens sumbana (Sumba)
