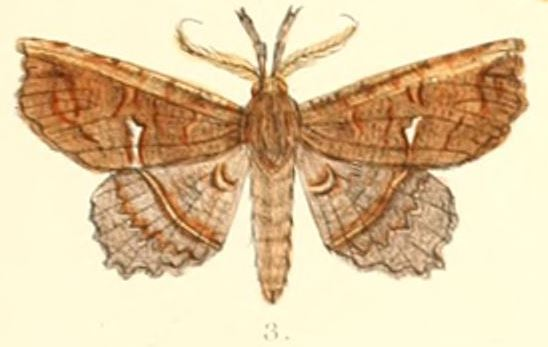

Scientific classification
- Domain: Eukaryota
- Kingdom: Animalia
- Phylum: Arthropoda
- Class: Insecta
- Order: Lepidoptera
- Superfamily: Noctuoidea
- Family: Erebidae
- Genus: Acharya
- Species: A. crassicornis

Binomial name
- Acharya crassicornis Moore, 1882

= Acharya crassicornis =

Species of moth

Acharya crassicornis is a moth of the family Erebidae first described by Frederic Moore in 1882. It is found in India.
