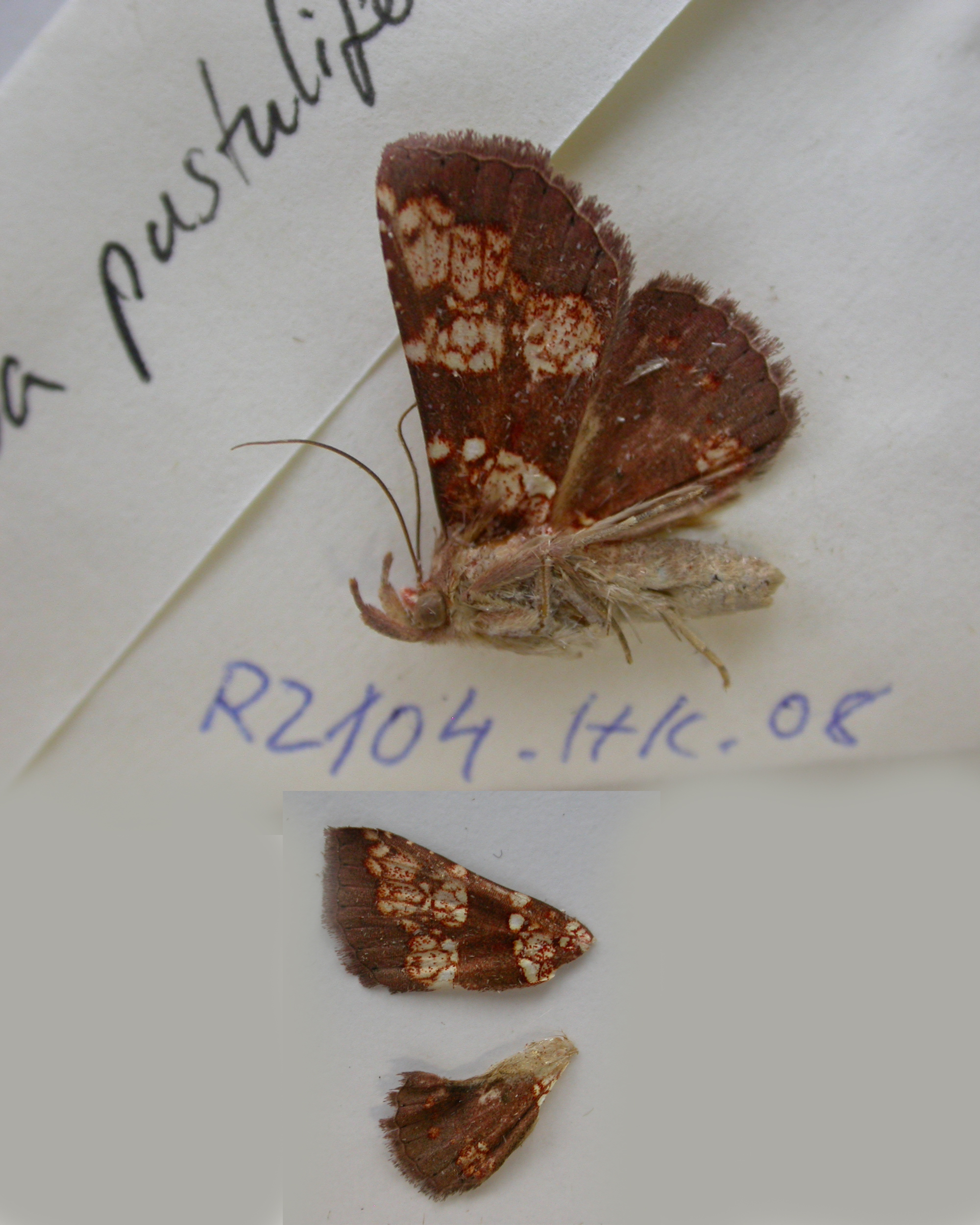

Scientific classification
- Kingdom: Animalia
- Phylum: Arthropoda
- Clade: Pancrustacea
- Class: Insecta
- Order: Lepidoptera
- Superfamily: Noctuoidea
- Family: Erebidae
- Genus: Saroba
- Species: S. pustulifera

Binomial name
- Saroba pustulifera Walker, 1865

= Saroba pustulifera =

Species of moth

Saroba pustulifera is a moth of the family Noctuidae first described by Francis Walker in 1865. It is found in the Indian subregion, Hong Kong, Thailand, Sundaland, Sulawesi and Sri Lanka.

Its forewings are distinctive with extensive whitish blotches basally and postmedially on the forewing.
