= Lycimna =

Scientific classification
- Kingdom: Animalia
- Phylum: Arthropoda
- Class: Insecta
- Order: Lepidoptera
- Superfamily: Noctuoidea
- Family: Erebidae
- Subfamily: Calpinae
- Genus: Lycimna; Walker, 1860
- Species: L. polymesata

Binomial name
- Lycimna polymesata Walker, 1860

Genus of moths

Lycimna is a monotypic moth genus of the family Erebidae. Its only species, Lycimna polymesata, is found in the north-eastern Himalayas, Borneo, Sumatra and Java. Both the genus and the species were first described by Francis Walker in 1860.
