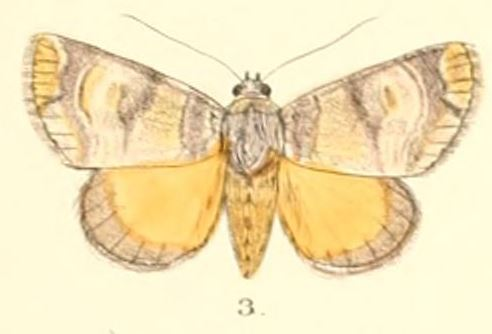

Scientific classification
- Domain: Eukaryota
- Kingdom: Animalia
- Phylum: Arthropoda
- Class: Insecta
- Order: Lepidoptera
- Superfamily: Noctuoidea
- Family: Noctuidae
- Genus: Antitrisuloides
- Species: A. catocalina

Binomial name
- Antitrisuloides catocalina (Moore, 1882)

Synonyms
- Tambana catocalina Moore, 1882; Trisuloides polyphaenaria Warren, 1912

= Antitrisuloides catocalina =

Species of moth

Antitrisuloides catocalina is a moth of the family Noctuidae first described by Frederic Moore in 1882. It is found in India.
