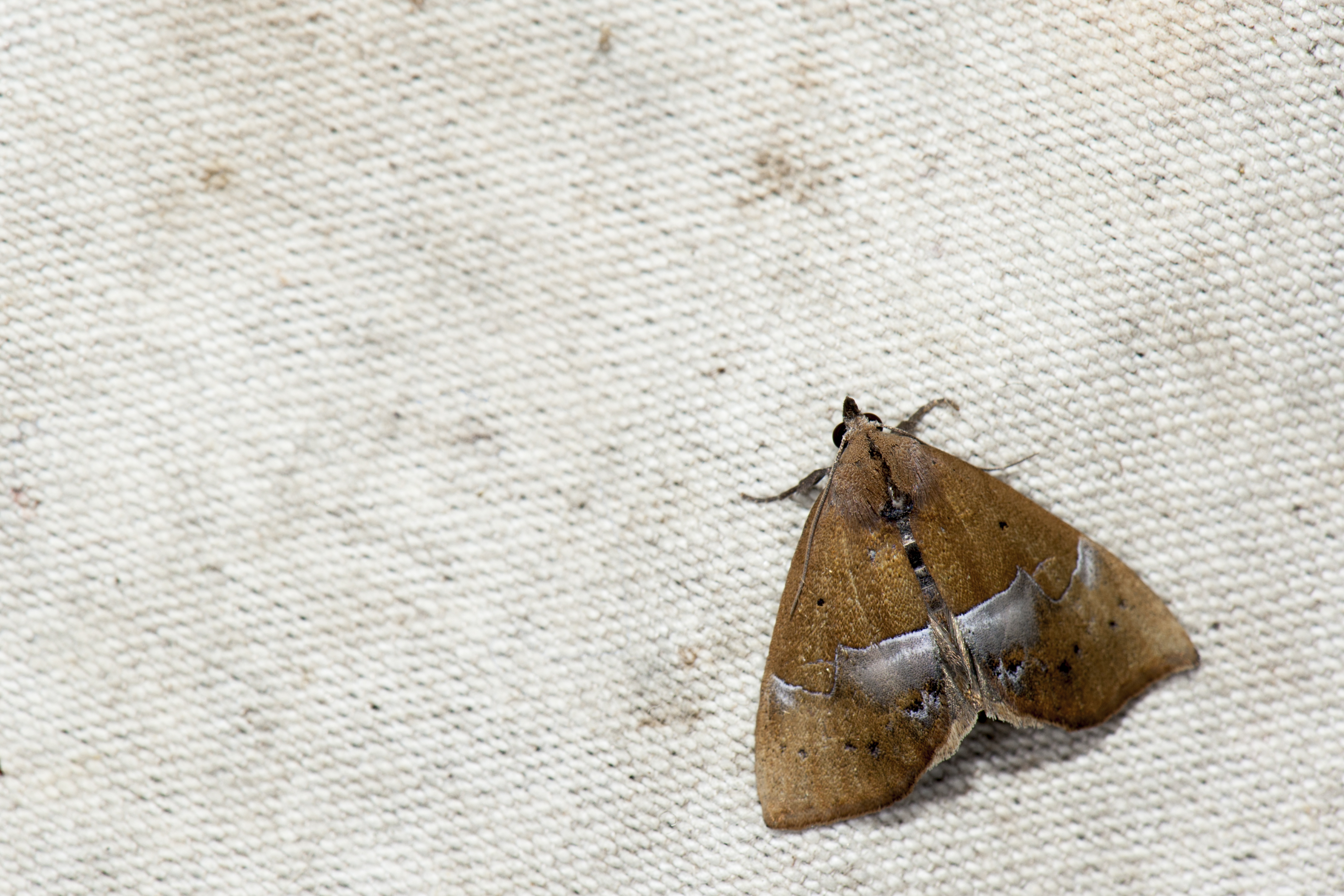

Scientific classification
- Kingdom: Animalia
- Phylum: Arthropoda
- Clade: Pancrustacea
- Class: Insecta
- Order: Lepidoptera
- Superfamily: Noctuoidea
- Family: Erebidae
- Subfamily: Calpinae
- Genus: Coarica; Moore, 1882
- Species: C. fasciata

Binomial name
- Coarica fasciata Moore, 1882

= Coarica =

Genus of moths

Coarica is a monotypic moth genus of the family Noctuidae. Its only species, Coarica fasciata, is known from India, Thailand and China. Both the genus and species were first described by Frederic Moore in 1882.
