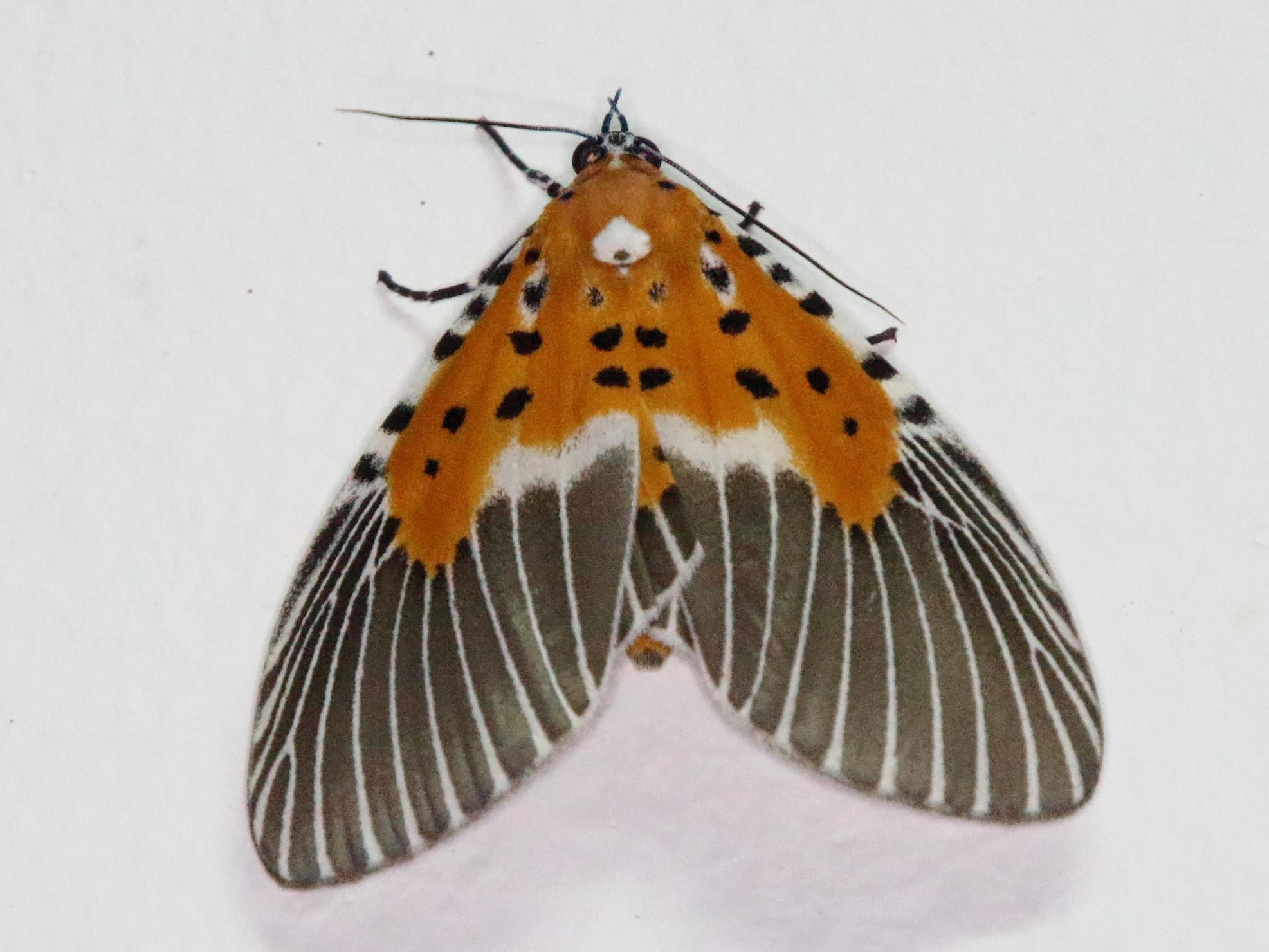

Scientific classification
- Kingdom: Animalia
- Phylum: Arthropoda
- Class: Insecta
- Order: Lepidoptera
- Superfamily: Noctuoidea
- Family: Erebidae
- Genus: Peridrome
- Species: P. subfascia

Binomial name
- Peridrome subfascia (Walker, 1854)

Synonyms
- Hypsa subfascia Walker, 1854; Anagnia subfascia (Walker, 1854); Anagnia subfasciata Moore, 1878

= Peridrome subfascia =

Species of moth

Peridrome subfascia is a species of moth in the family Erebidae first described by Francis Walker in 1854. The species is found in Bangladesh, India, Malaysia, Myanmar, Thailand and Vietnam.

The wingspan is 64–67 mm.
