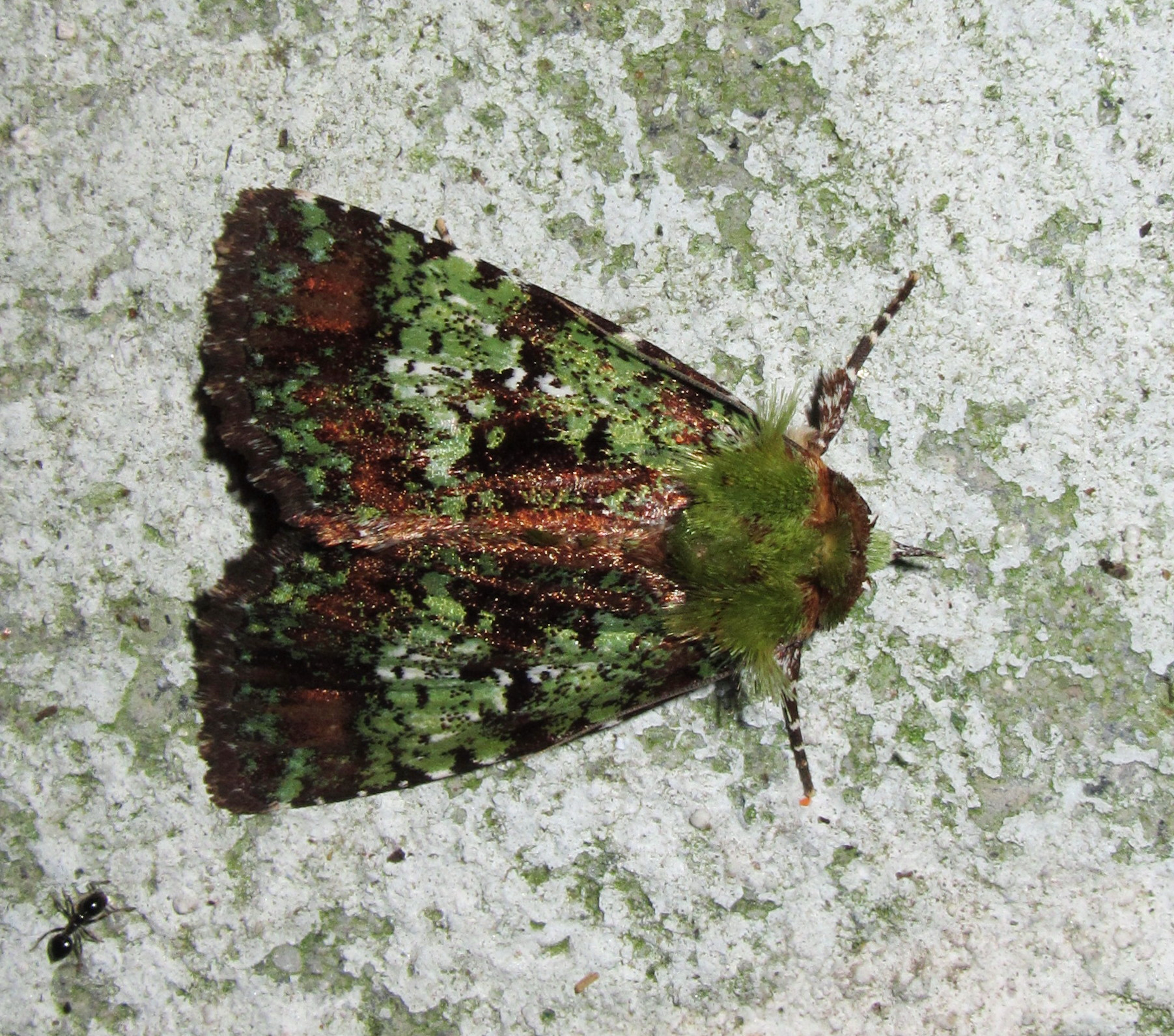

Scientific classification
- Domain: Eukaryota
- Kingdom: Animalia
- Phylum: Arthropoda
- Class: Insecta
- Order: Lepidoptera
- Superfamily: Noctuoidea
- Family: Noctuidae
- Genus: Viridistria
- Species: V. striatovirens

Binomial name
- Viridistria striatovirens (Moore, 1883)

Synonyms
- Donda striatovirens Moore, 1882; Belciana striatovirens

= Viridistria striatovirens =

Species of moth

Viridistria striatovirens is a species of moth in the family Noctuidae. It was first described by Frederic Moore in 1883 and is found in India.
