= Marapana pulverata =

Scientific classification
- Kingdom: Animalia
- Phylum: Arthropoda
- Clade: Pancrustacea
- Class: Insecta
- Order: Lepidoptera
- Superfamily: Noctuoidea
- Family: Erebidae
- Genus: Marapana
- Species: M. pulverata

Binomial name
- Marapana pulverata Guenée, 1852

Synonyms
- Sanys pulverata Guenée, 1852; Hypena raralis Walker, [1859]1858; Hypena truncatalis Walker, 1865; Marapana bilineata Bethune-Baker, 1908; Marapana pulverata Guenée sensu Holloway, 1976

Species of insect

Marapana pulverata is a moth of the family Noctuidae first described by Achille Guenée in 1852. It is found in India, Sri Lanka, Thailand, Myanmar, the Andaman Islands, Peninsular Malaysia, Singapore, Borneo, Sulawesi, Seram and New Guinea.

Facies is a richer brown. Costa of the hindwing is broadly dull ochreous yellow.
