= Asota subsimilis =

Scientific classification
- Kingdom: Animalia
- Phylum: Arthropoda
- Class: Insecta
- Order: Lepidoptera
- Superfamily: Noctuoidea
- Family: Erebidae
- Genus: Asota
- Species: A. subsimilis

Binomial name
- Asota subsimilis (Walker, 1864)

Synonyms
- Hypsa subsimilis Walker, 1864

Species of moth

Asota subsimilis is a moth of the family Erebidae first described by Francis Walker in 1864. It is found in Cambodia, Malaysia, Myanmar, Papua New Guinea, Singapore and Thailand. The larval host plant is Ficus fistulosa.

The wingspan is 51–56 mm.
