= Asota dohertyi =

Scientific classification
- Domain: Eukaryota
- Kingdom: Animalia
- Phylum: Arthropoda
- Class: Insecta
- Order: Lepidoptera
- Superfamily: Noctuoidea
- Family: Erebidae
- Genus: Asota
- Species: A. dohertyi

Binomial name
- Asota dohertyi Rothschild, 1897

Species of moth

Asota dohertyi is a moth of the family Erebidae first described by Walter Rothschild in 1897. It is found on Sulawesi.
