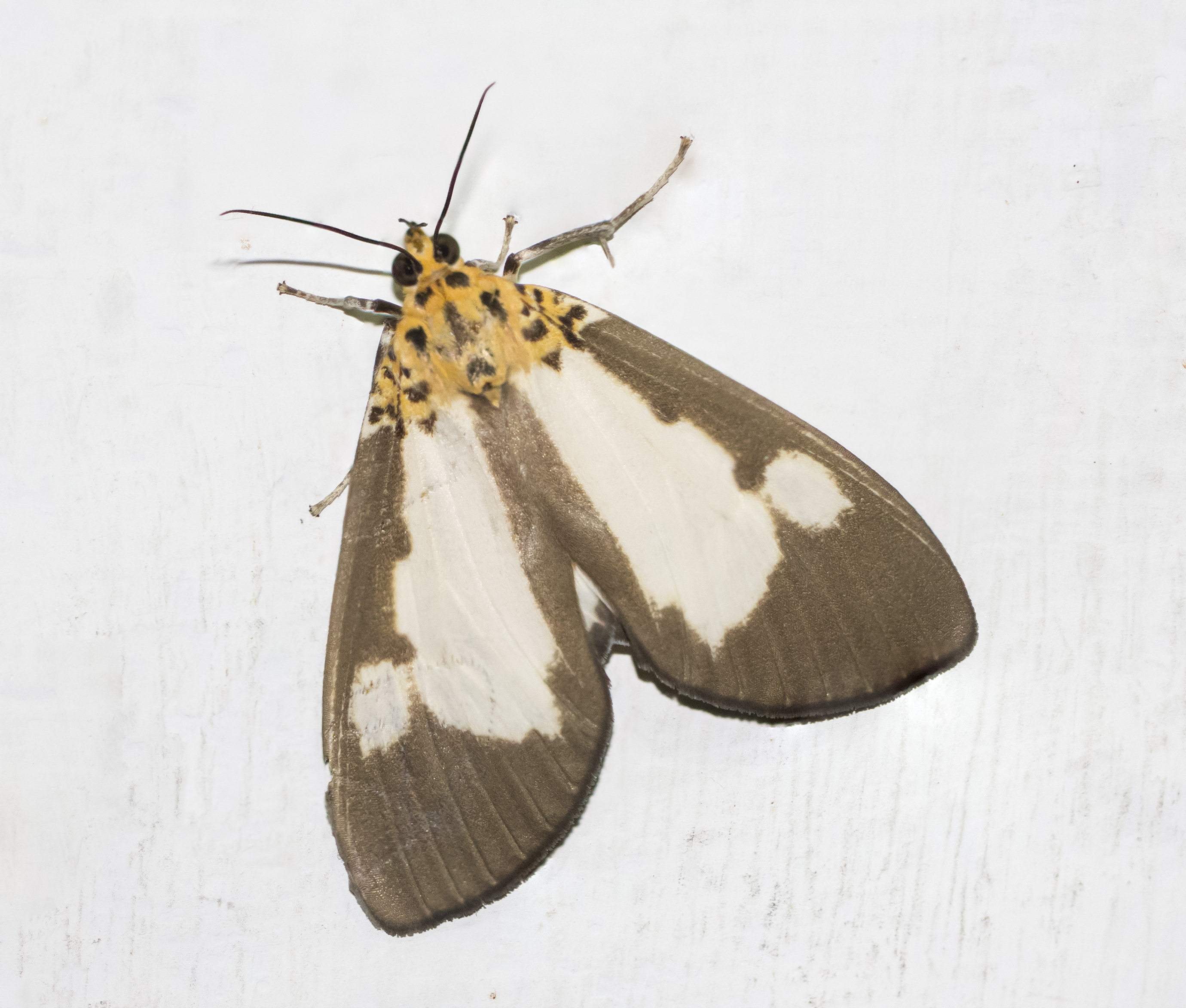
- From Japan

Scientific classification
- Kingdom: Animalia
- Phylum: Arthropoda
- Class: Insecta
- Order: Lepidoptera
- Superfamily: Noctuoidea
- Family: Erebidae
- Genus: Asota
- Species: A. plana

Binomial name
- Asota plana Walker, 1854

Synonyms
- Hypsa persecta Butler, 1875; Aganais albifera Felder, 1874; Asota plana f. confluens Strand, 1915; Asota centralis Rothschild, 1897; Asota cincta Rothschild, 1897; Asota complana Walker, 1875; Asota commixta Rothschild, 1897; Asota fergussonis Rothschild, 1897; Asota intermedia Rothschild, 1897; Hypsa lacteata Butler, 1881; Asota ternatensis Rothschild, 1897; Asota transiens Rothschild, 1897

= Asota plana =

Species of moth

Asota plana is a moth in the family Erebidae first described by Francis Walker in 1854. It is found from the Oriental tropics east to New Guinea.

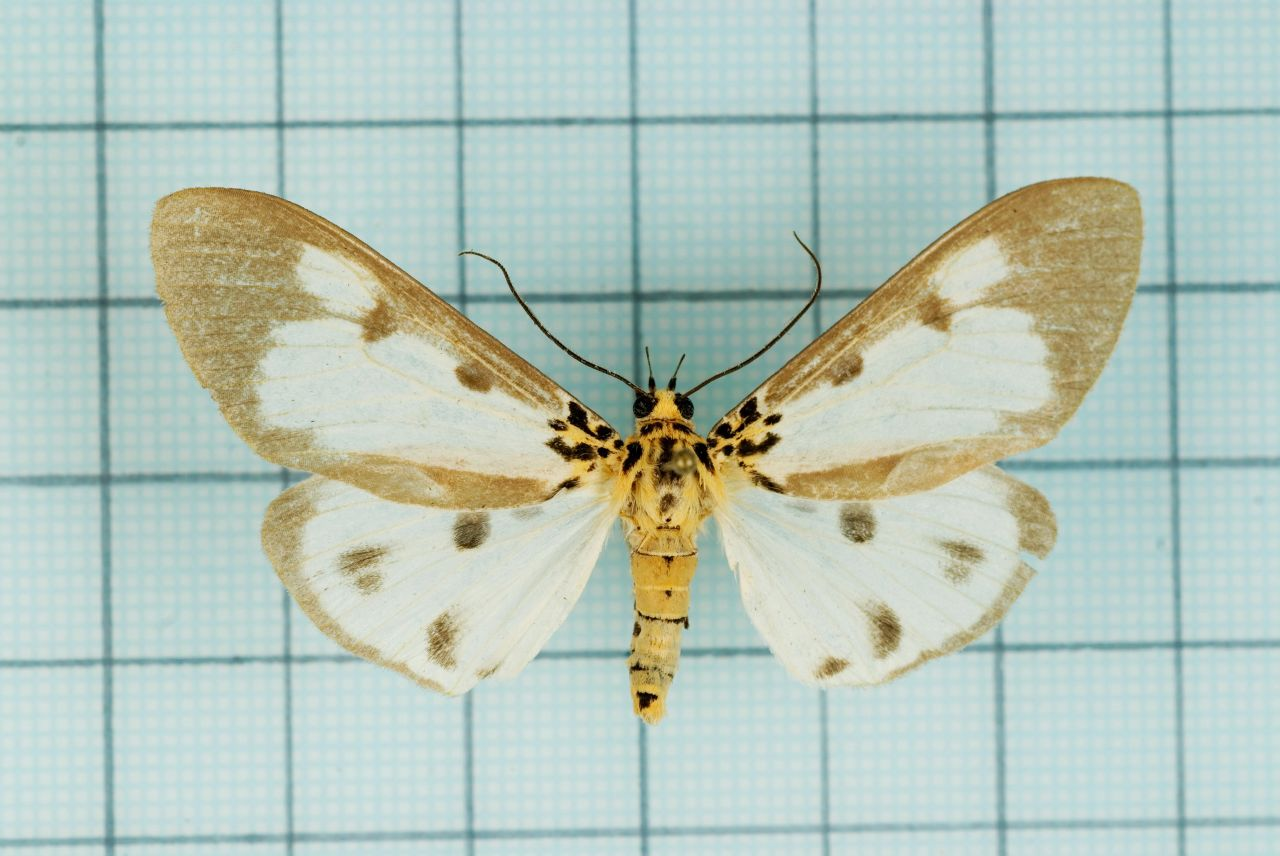
Female

== Description ==
The wingspan is about 56 mm. The forewings have a large white patch filling the lower half of the cell and the whole area below except inner margin and extending to near outer margin. Its upper edge has two dentitions, its outer edge is irregular and a large white spot at upper angle of cell. Hindwings with the narrow marginal band. There is an extra spot towards anal angle. Larva have a large head with sparsely distributed hairs on its body with dark purplish-brown ground color. The thoracic somites are pale red and there is a narrow transverse yellow band on fourth to terminal somites.

== Ecology ==
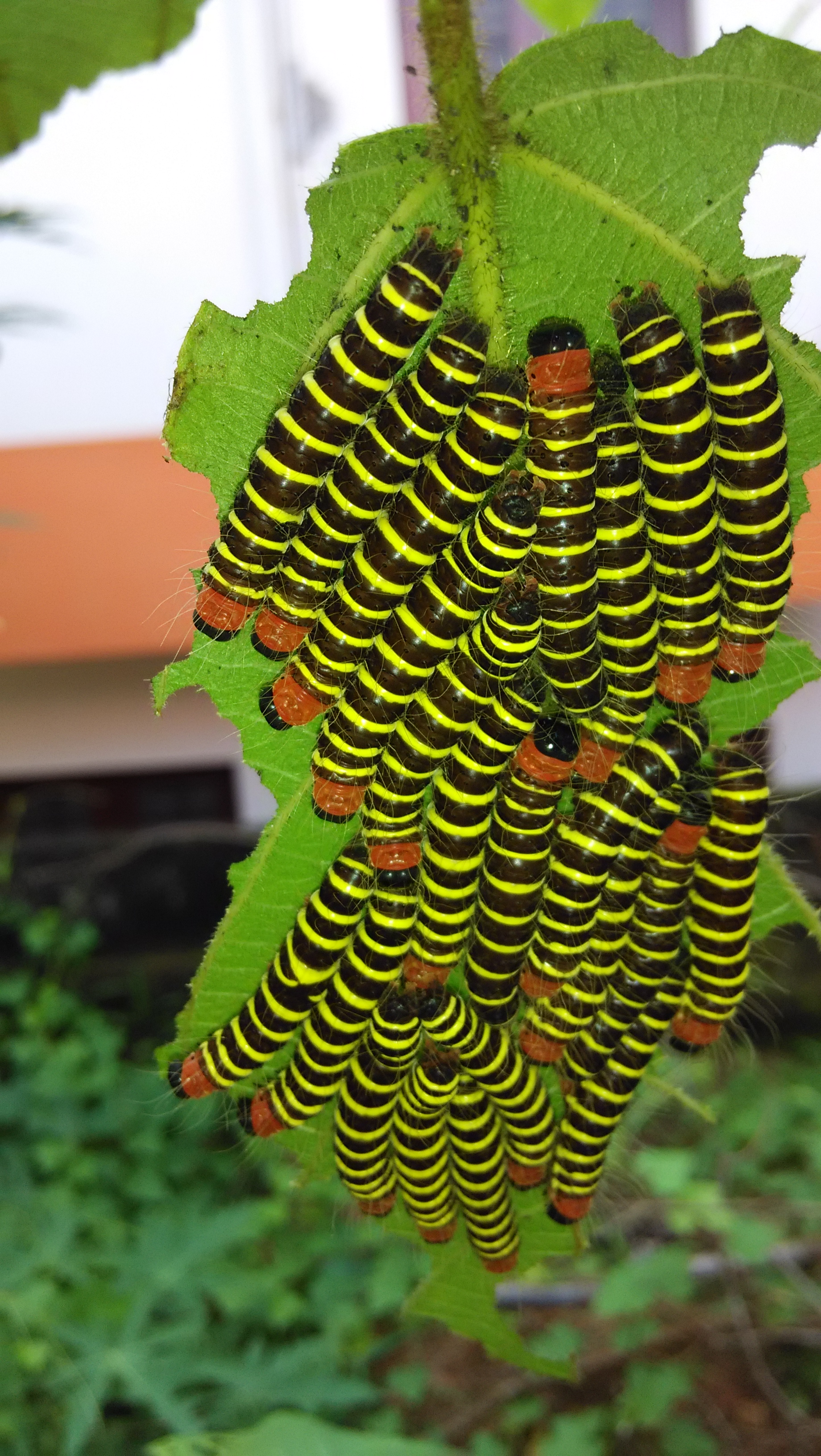
Caterpillars of Asota plana from Thiruvananthapuram, India

Larvae have been recorded on Ficus species, where they rest on the underside of the leaf.

== Subspecies ==
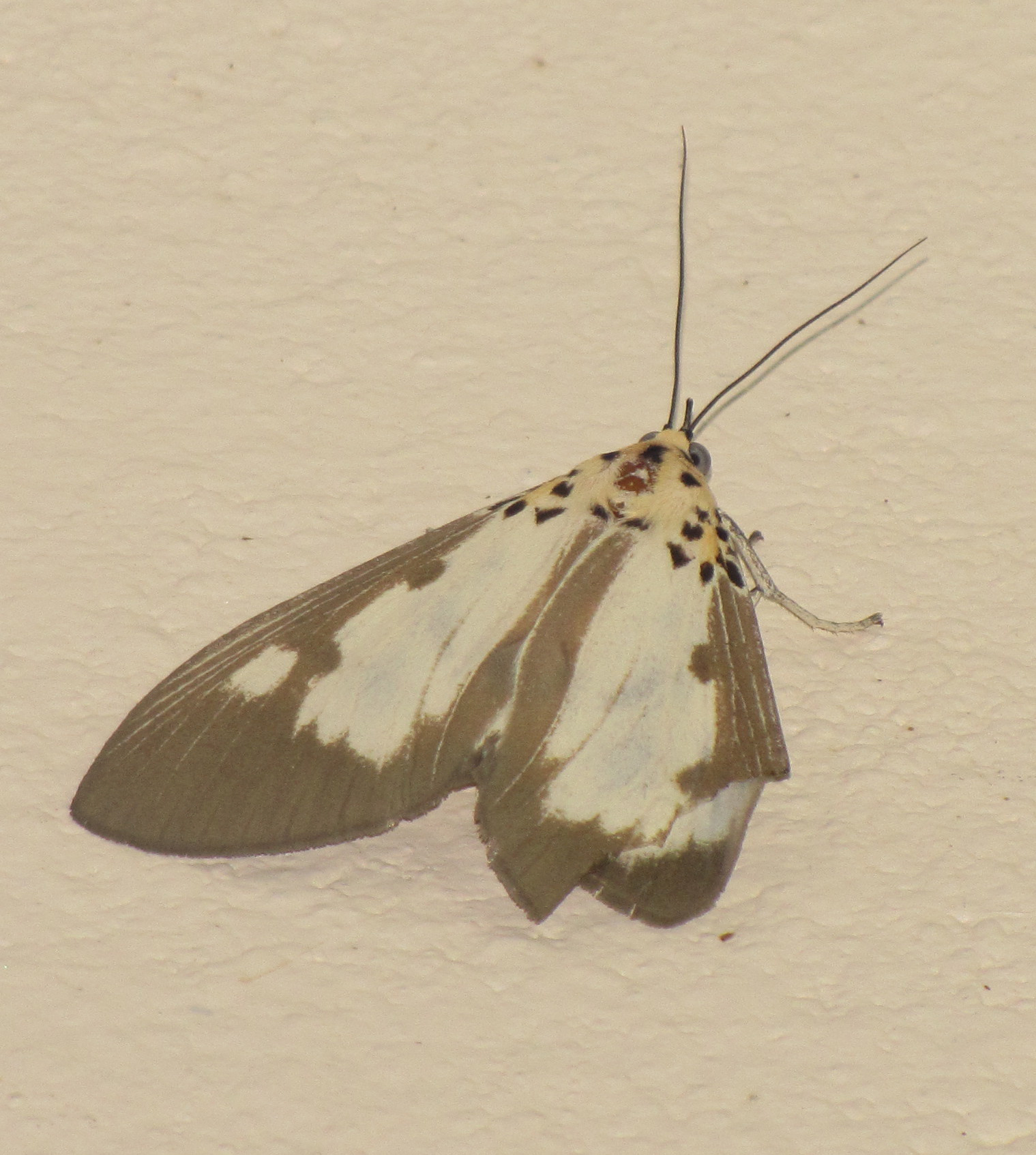
Asota plana albifera

- Asota plana albifera (India, Indonesia, Japan, Malaysia, Micronesia, Papua New Guinea, Philippines, Sikkim, Singapore, Taiwan)
- Asota plana centralis (Andaman Islands, Indonesia, Philippines, Taiwan)
- Asota plana cincta (Indonesia)
- Asota plana commixta (Indonesia)
- Asota plana fergussonis (Papua New Guinea)
- Asota plana intermedia (Indonesia)
- Asota plana lacteata (Taiwan)
- Asota plana persecta (Indonesia)
- Asota plana plana (China, East Timor, India, Indonesia, Japan, Laos, Malaysia, Myanmar, Nepal, Sikkim, Sri Lanka, Thailand, northern Vietnam)
- Asota plana transiens (Enggano)
