= Asota fulvia =

Scientific classification
- Domain: Eukaryota
- Kingdom: Animalia
- Phylum: Arthropoda
- Class: Insecta
- Order: Lepidoptera
- Superfamily: Noctuoidea
- Family: Erebidae
- Genus: Asota
- Species: A. fulvia

Binomial name
- Asota fulvia (Donovan, 1805)

Synonyms
- Noctua fulvia Donovan, 1805

Species of moth

Asota fulvia is a moth of the family Erebidae first described by Edward Donovan in 1805. It is found in Indonesia.

The wingspan is about 60 mm.
