= Asota tigrina =

Scientific classification
- Domain: Eukaryota
- Kingdom: Animalia
- Phylum: Arthropoda
- Class: Insecta
- Order: Lepidoptera
- Superfamily: Noctuoidea
- Family: Erebidae
- Genus: Asota
- Species: A. tigrina

Binomial name
- Asota tigrina (Butler, 1882)

Synonyms
- Damalis tigrina Butler, 1882

Species of moth

Asota tigrina is a moth of the family Erebidae first described by Arthur Gardiner Butler in 1882. It is found in Papua New Guinea.
