= Asota alienata =

Scientific classification
- Kingdom: Animalia
- Phylum: Arthropoda
- Class: Insecta
- Order: Lepidoptera
- Superfamily: Noctuoidea
- Family: Erebidae
- Genus: Asota
- Species: A. alienata

Binomial name
- Asota alienata (Walker, 1864)

Synonyms
- Agarista alienata Walker, 1864

Species of moth

Asota alienata is a moth of the family Erebidae first described by Francis Walker in 1864. It is found in Papua New Guinea and the New Hebrides.
