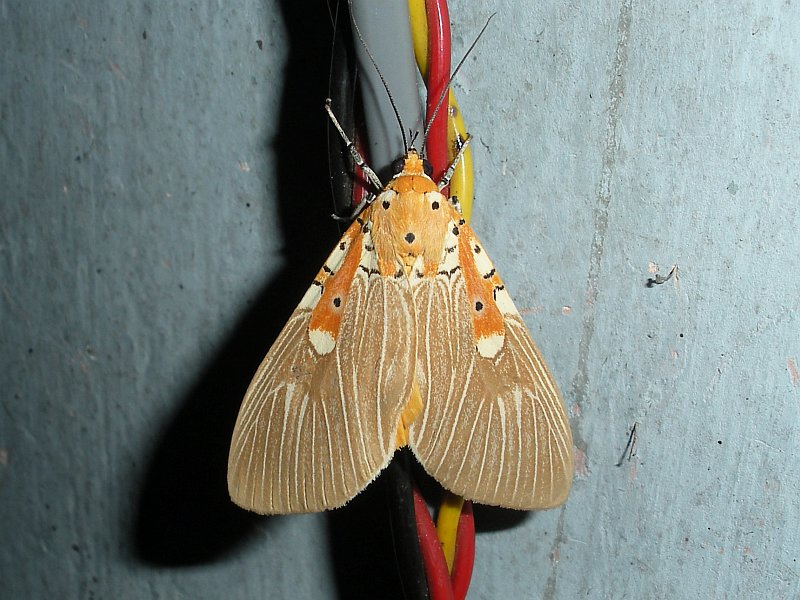

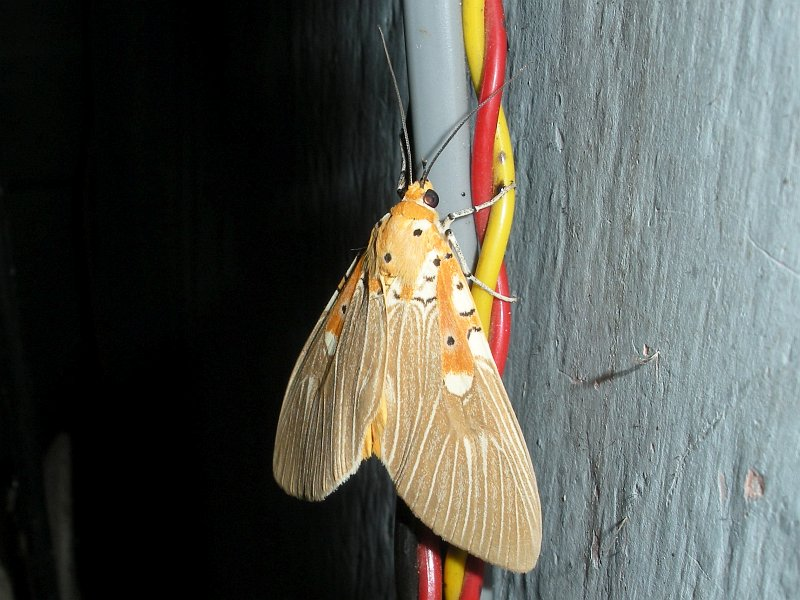

Scientific classification
- Kingdom: Animalia
- Phylum: Arthropoda
- Class: Insecta
- Order: Lepidoptera
- Superfamily: Noctuoidea
- Family: Erebidae
- Genus: Asota
- Species: A. ficus

Binomial name
- Asota ficus (Fabricius, 1775)

Synonyms
- Noctua ficus Fabricius, 1775; Aganais ficus (Fabricius, 1775)

= Asota ficus =

Species of moth

Asota ficus is a moth in the family Erebidae first described by Johan Christian Fabricius in 1775. It is found in Afghanistan, Bangladesh, China, Taiwan, India, Indonesia (Sumatra), Laos, Myanmar, Nepal, Pakistan, Sri Lanka, Thailand and northern Vietnam.

== Description ==
The wingspan is about 67 mm. Antennae of male fasciculated and long. Third joint of palpi long which is grey tipped with black. Base of tegula yellow with a black spot. Dorsal spot of abdomen is often almost obsolete. Forewings with a yellow basal patch which extends along costa and in cell to two thirds length of cell, with an orange spot outlined with black on the costa, streaks in the cell and on inner margin. Two black spots found on costa with two in cell, one on inner margin and two lines across interno-median interspace. The rest of the wing is pale reddish brown with yellow streaked veins. Hindwings are bright orange yellowish. There is a black spot at end of cell and a submarginal irregular series.

Larva has a black head. Somites are dark velvety brown with slight white hairs arising from red papilla. Yellow patches can be found on fourth to eleventh somites.

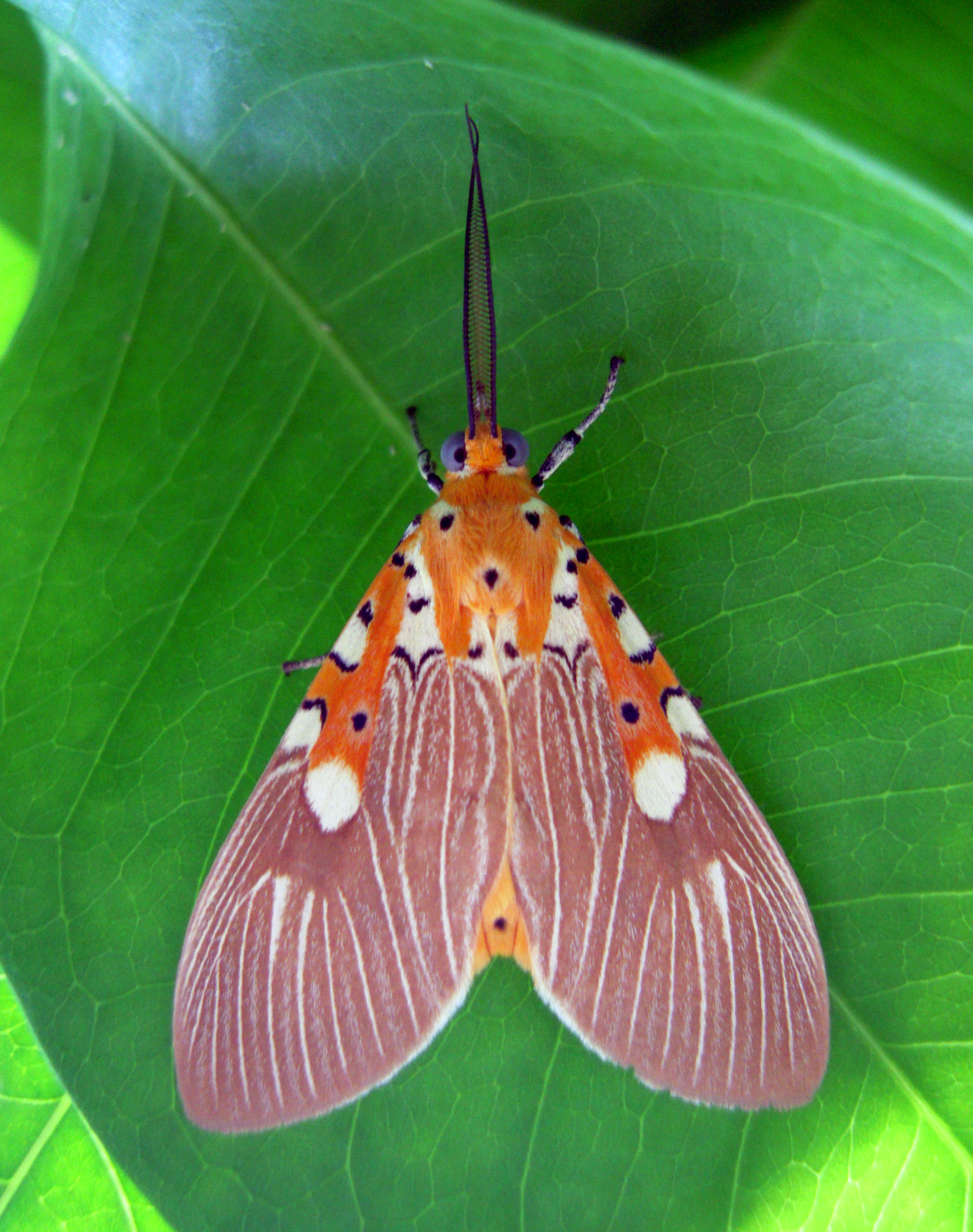
In Tirunelveli, India
