= Asota brunnescens =

Scientific classification
- Domain: Eukaryota
- Kingdom: Animalia
- Phylum: Arthropoda
- Class: Insecta
- Order: Lepidoptera
- Superfamily: Noctuoidea
- Family: Erebidae
- Genus: Asota
- Species: A. brunnescens

Binomial name
- Asota brunnescens Nieuwenhuis, 1948

Species of moth

Asota brunnescens is a moth of the family Erebidae first described by Nieuwenhuis in 1948. It is found in Indonesia.
