= Asota diana =

Scientific classification
- Domain: Eukaryota
- Kingdom: Animalia
- Phylum: Arthropoda
- Class: Insecta
- Order: Lepidoptera
- Superfamily: Noctuoidea
- Family: Erebidae
- Genus: Asota
- Species: A. diana

Binomial name
- Asota diana (Butler, 1887)

Synonyms
- Hypsa diana Butler, 1887; Asota shortlandica Pagenstecher, 1900; Asota nervosa Rothschild & Jordan, 1901

Species of moth

Asota diana is a moth of the family Erebidae first described by Arthur Gardiner Butler in 1887. It is found on Solomon Islands and in Indonesia.

The wingspan is 56–59 mm.

== Subspecies ==
- Asota diana diana (Aru islands, Solomon Islands)
- Asota diana tiphlops (Solomon Islands)
