= Asota concinnula =

Scientific classification
- Kingdom: Animalia
- Phylum: Arthropoda
- Class: Insecta
- Order: Lepidoptera
- Superfamily: Noctuoidea
- Family: Erebidae
- Genus: Asota
- Species: A. concinnula

Binomial name
- Asota concinnula (Mabile, 1878)

Synonyms
- Hypsa concinnula Mabile, 1878

Species of moth

Asota concinnula is a moth of the family Erebidae first described by Mabile in 1878. It is found in Zaire.
