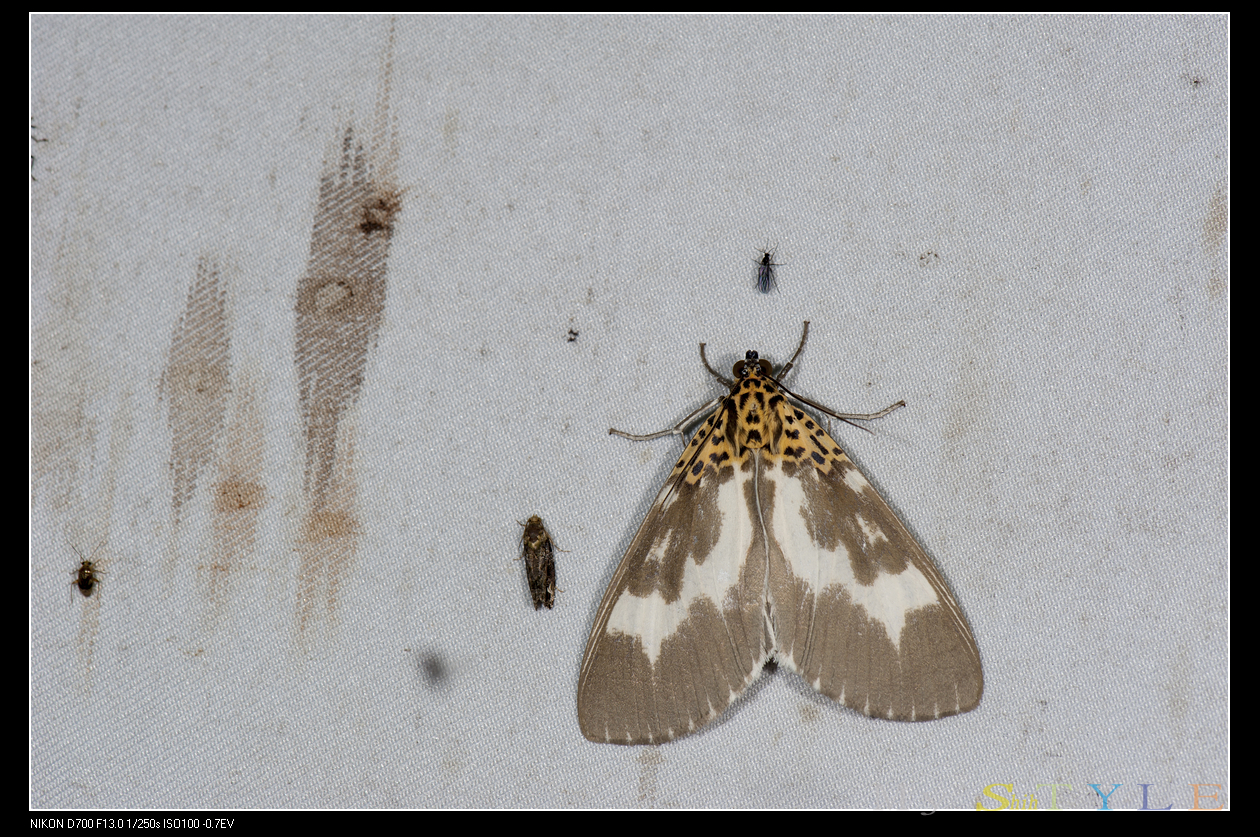

Scientific classification
- Domain: Eukaryota
- Kingdom: Animalia
- Phylum: Arthropoda
- Class: Insecta
- Order: Lepidoptera
- Superfamily: Noctuoidea
- Family: Erebidae
- Genus: Asota
- Species: A. tortuosa

Binomial name
- Asota tortuosa (Moore, 1872)

Synonyms
- Hypsa tortuosa Moore, 1872

= Asota tortuosa =

Species of moth

Asota tortuosa is a moth of the family Erebidae first described by Frederic Moore in 1872. It is found in China, India, Myanmar, Nepal, Sikkim and Taiwan.

The wingspan is 61–67 mm.
