= Asota sericea =

Scientific classification
- Domain: Eukaryota
- Kingdom: Animalia
- Phylum: Arthropoda
- Class: Insecta
- Order: Lepidoptera
- Superfamily: Noctuoidea
- Family: Erebidae
- Genus: Asota
- Species: A. sericea

Binomial name
- Asota sericea (Moore, 1878)

Synonyms
- Hypsa sericea Moore, 1878

Species of moth

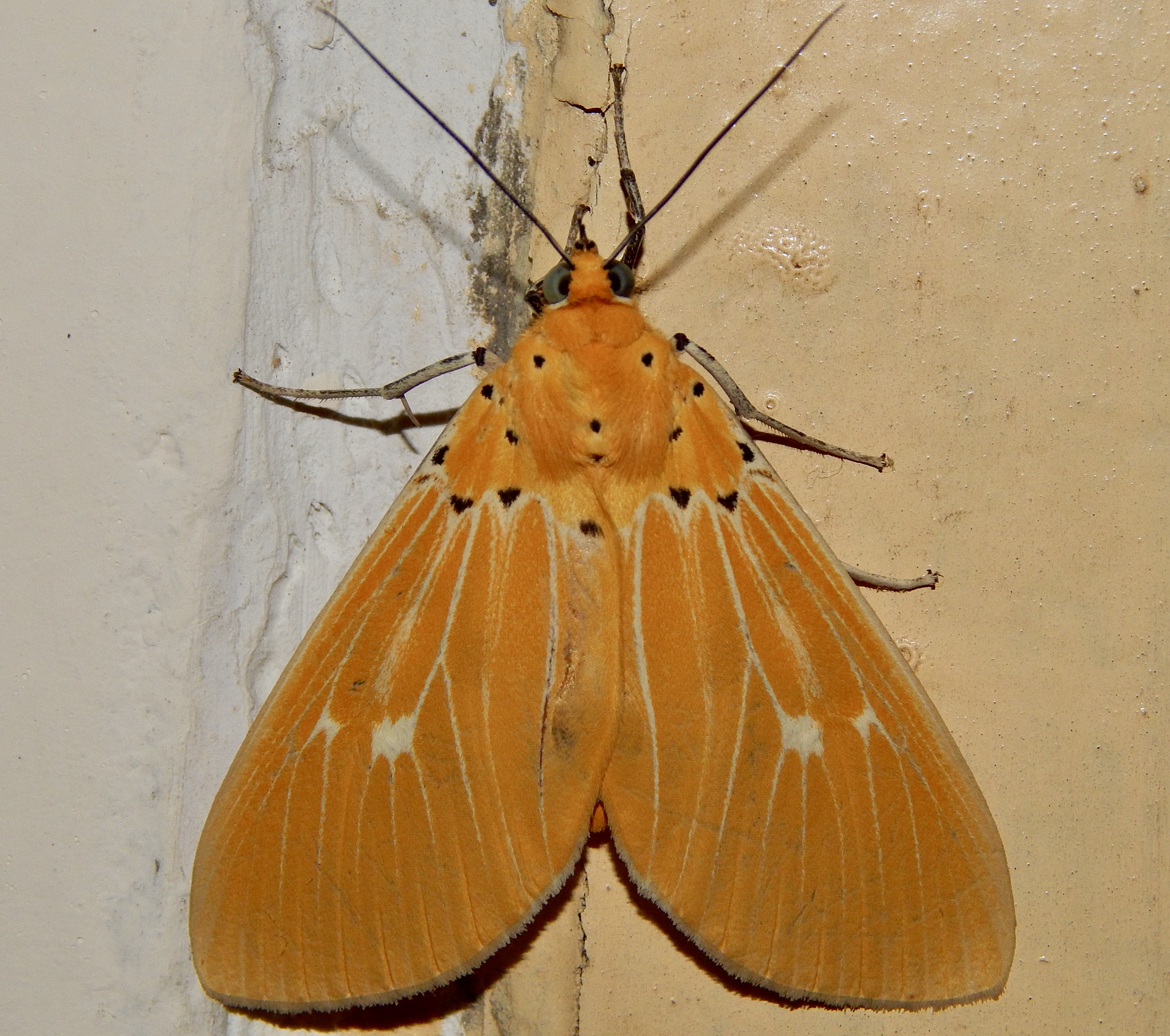

Asota sericea is a moth of the family Erebidae first described by Frederic Moore in 1878. It is found in India.

The wingspan is 59–64 mm.
