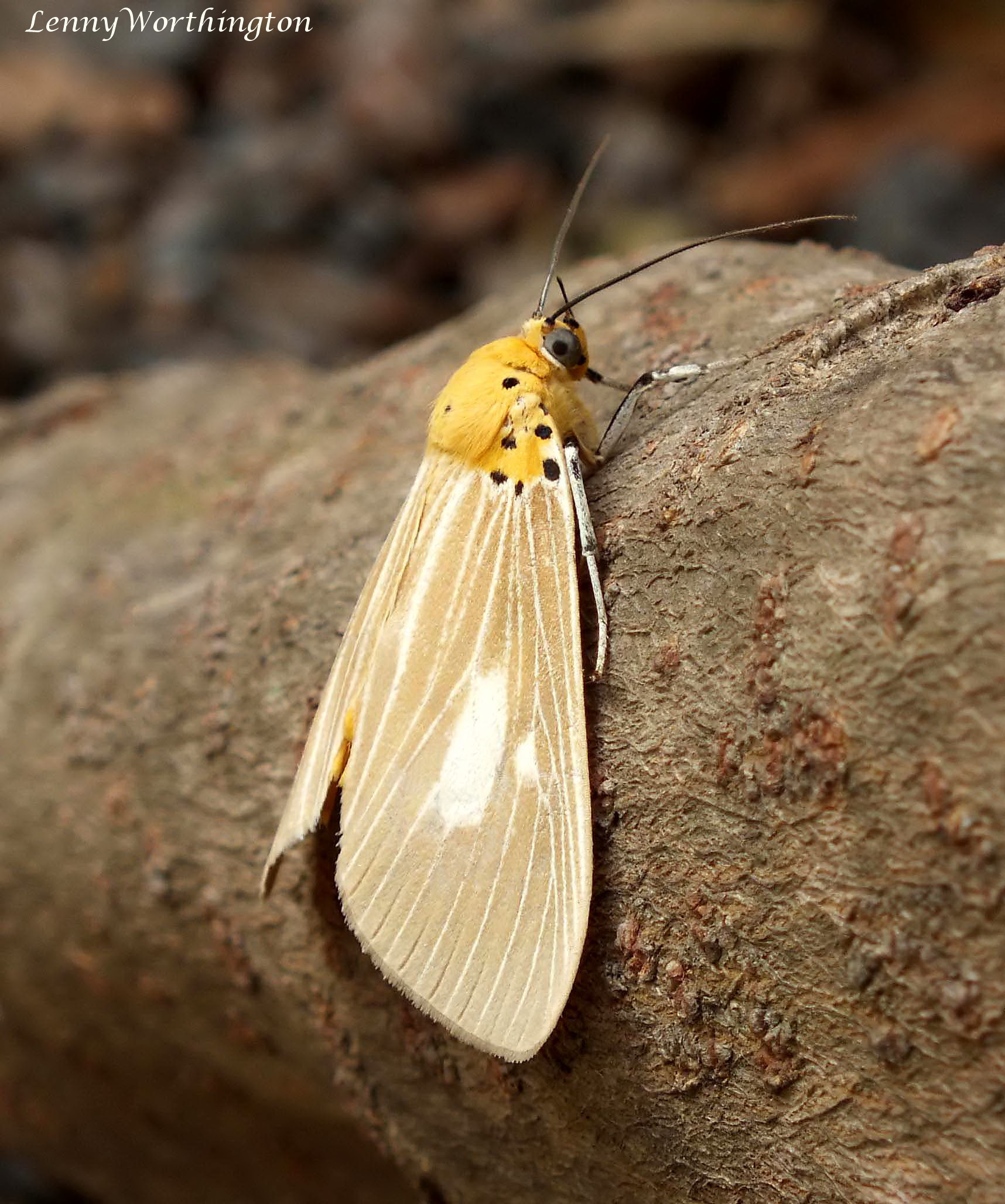

Scientific classification
- Domain: Eukaryota
- Kingdom: Animalia
- Phylum: Arthropoda
- Class: Insecta
- Order: Lepidoptera
- Superfamily: Noctuoidea
- Family: Erebidae
- Genus: Asota
- Species: A. plaginota

Binomial name
- Asota plaginota (Butler, 1875)

Synonyms
- Hypsa plaginota Butler, 1875

= Asota plaginota =

Species of moth

Asota plaginota is a moth of the family Erebidae first described by Arthur Gardiner Butler in 1875. It is found in China, India, Indonesia, Myanmar, Malaysia, Nepal, Papua New Guinea, the Philippines, Sikkim, Singapore, Sri Lanka, Thailand and Vietnam. In Northeast India, it is recorded as a millet pest.

The wingspan is 61–65 mm.

== Subspecies ==
- Asota plaginota plaginota (China, India, Indonesia, Myanmar, Malaysia, Nepal, Papua New Guinea, Philippines, Sikkim, Sri Lanka, Thailand, Vietnam)
- Asota plaginota stigmatica (Borneo, Java)
- Asota plaginota strigivenata (China, India, Indonesia, Singapore)
