= Asota comorana =

Scientific classification
- Domain: Eukaryota
- Kingdom: Animalia
- Phylum: Arthropoda
- Class: Insecta
- Order: Lepidoptera
- Superfamily: Noctuoidea
- Family: Erebidae
- Genus: Asota
- Species: A. comorana

Binomial name
- Asota comorana (Aurivillius, 1909)

Synonyms
- Hypsa comorana Aurivillius, 1909

Species of moth

Asota comorana is a moth of the family Erebidae first described by Per Olof Christopher Aurivillius in 1909. It is found on the Comores.
