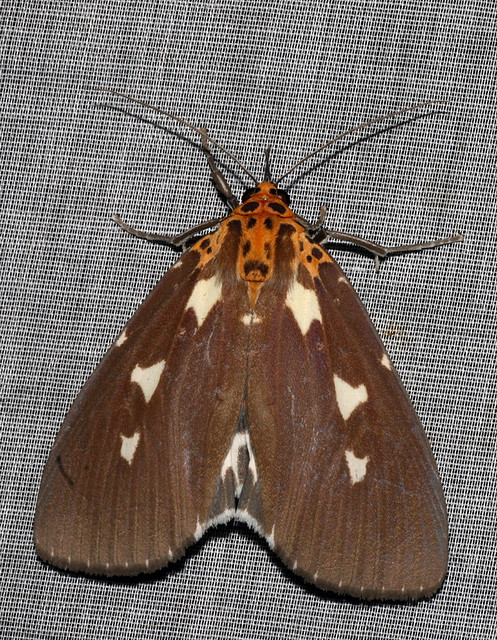
- Cameron Highlands of West Malaysia

Scientific classification
- Kingdom: Animalia
- Phylum: Arthropoda
- Clade: Pancrustacea
- Class: Insecta
- Order: Lepidoptera
- Superfamily: Noctuoidea
- Family: Erebidae
- Genus: Asota
- Species: A. contorta

Binomial name
- Asota contorta (Aurivillius, 1894)

Synonyms
- Hypsa contorta Aurivillius, 1894

= Asota contorta =

Species of moth

Asota contorta is a species of noctuoid moths in the family Erebidae first described by Per Olof Christopher Aurivillius in 1894. It is found on Bali, Java, Sumatra and in Peninsular Malaysia.

The wingspan is 59–62 mm.
