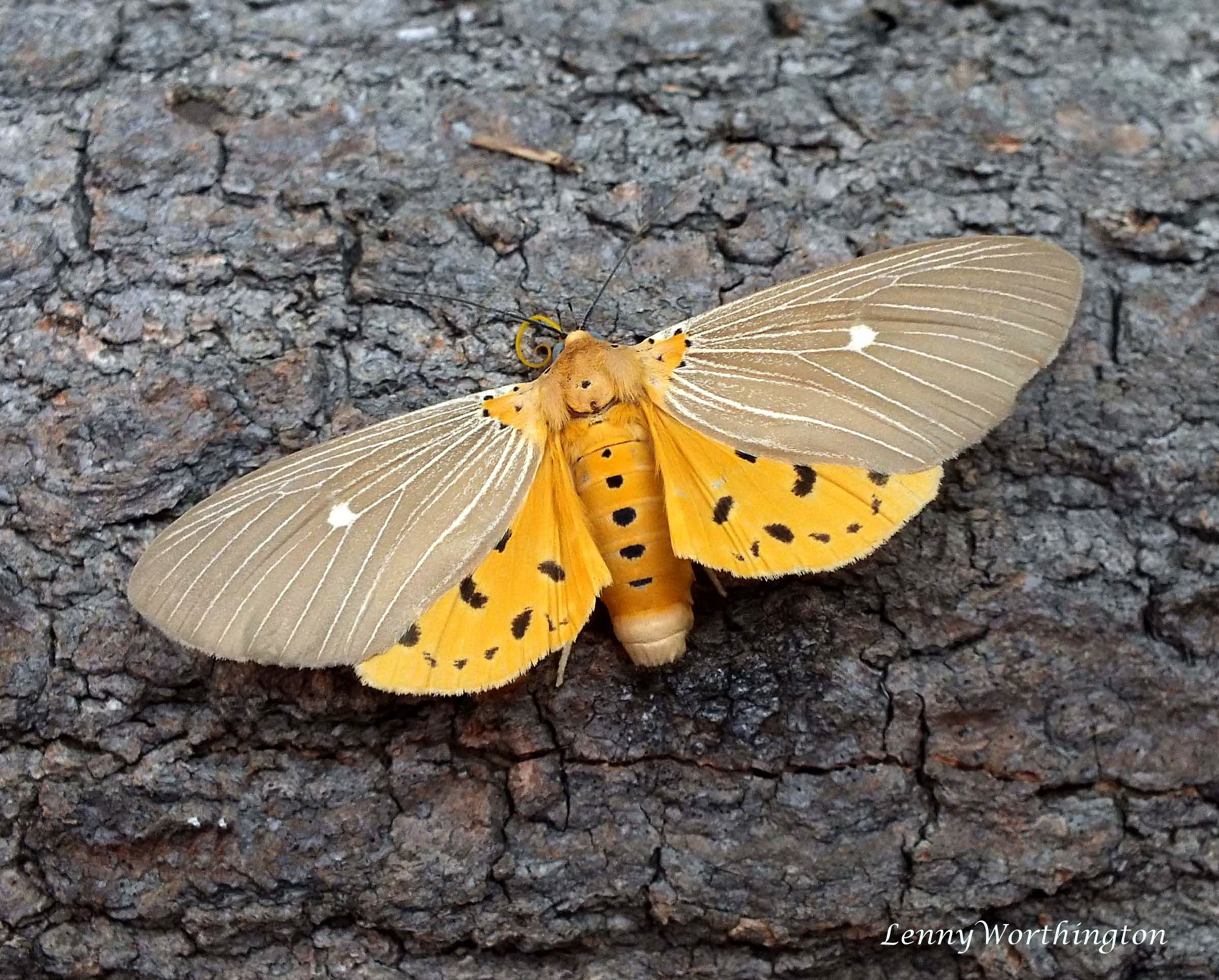

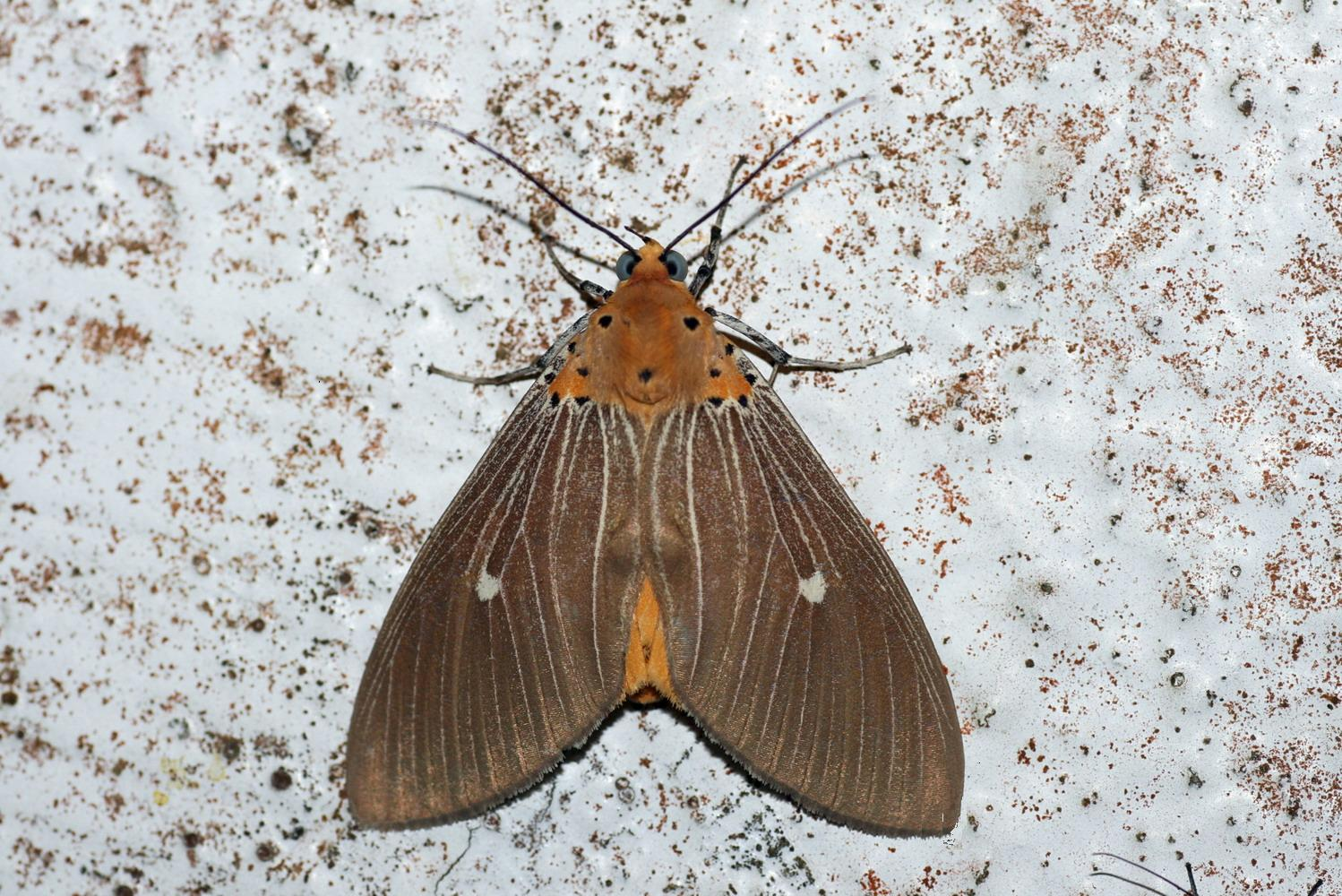

Scientific classification
- Kingdom: Animalia
- Phylum: Arthropoda
- Clade: Pancrustacea
- Class: Insecta
- Order: Lepidoptera
- Superfamily: Noctuoidea
- Family: Erebidae
- Genus: Asota
- Species: A. caricae

Binomial name
- Asota caricae (Fabricius, 1775)

Synonyms
- Noctua caricae Fabricius, 1775; Psephea alciphron Cramer, [1777]; Asota euroa Rothschild, 1897; Asota anawa Swinhoe, 1903

= Asota caricae =

Tropical tiger moth

Species of moth

Asota caricae, the tropical tiger moth, is a species of noctuoid moth in the family Erebidae. It is found from the Indo-Australian tropics of India and Sri Lanka to Queensland, Malaysia and Vanuatu.

== Description ==
The wingspan is 51–58 mm. Palpi with black spots on 1st and 2nd joints. Forewings brownish fuscous. There is a basal orange patch with two subbasal black spots and a series of three spots on its outer edge, that matches the coloration of the scales of the thorax. The veins are streaked with white. There is a white spot at lower angle of the discal cell. Hindwings are orange yellow, with a black spot at the end of the discal cell, one beyond, one below vein 2 and a submarginal irregular series which sometimes becomes a nearly complete marginal band. The veins crossing the band are yellowish. Larva black above, with two dorsal white bands, a sub-dorsal black spot on each somite. A series of lateral black specks present with sparse black hairs. Ventral coloration brown, head capsule is reddish.

== Ecology ==
The larvae have been recorded on Ficus, Broussonetia, Mesua, Tectona and Shorea species. Pupation is in a slight cocoon, fixed to a leaf. The species is found in forest and agricultural areas.

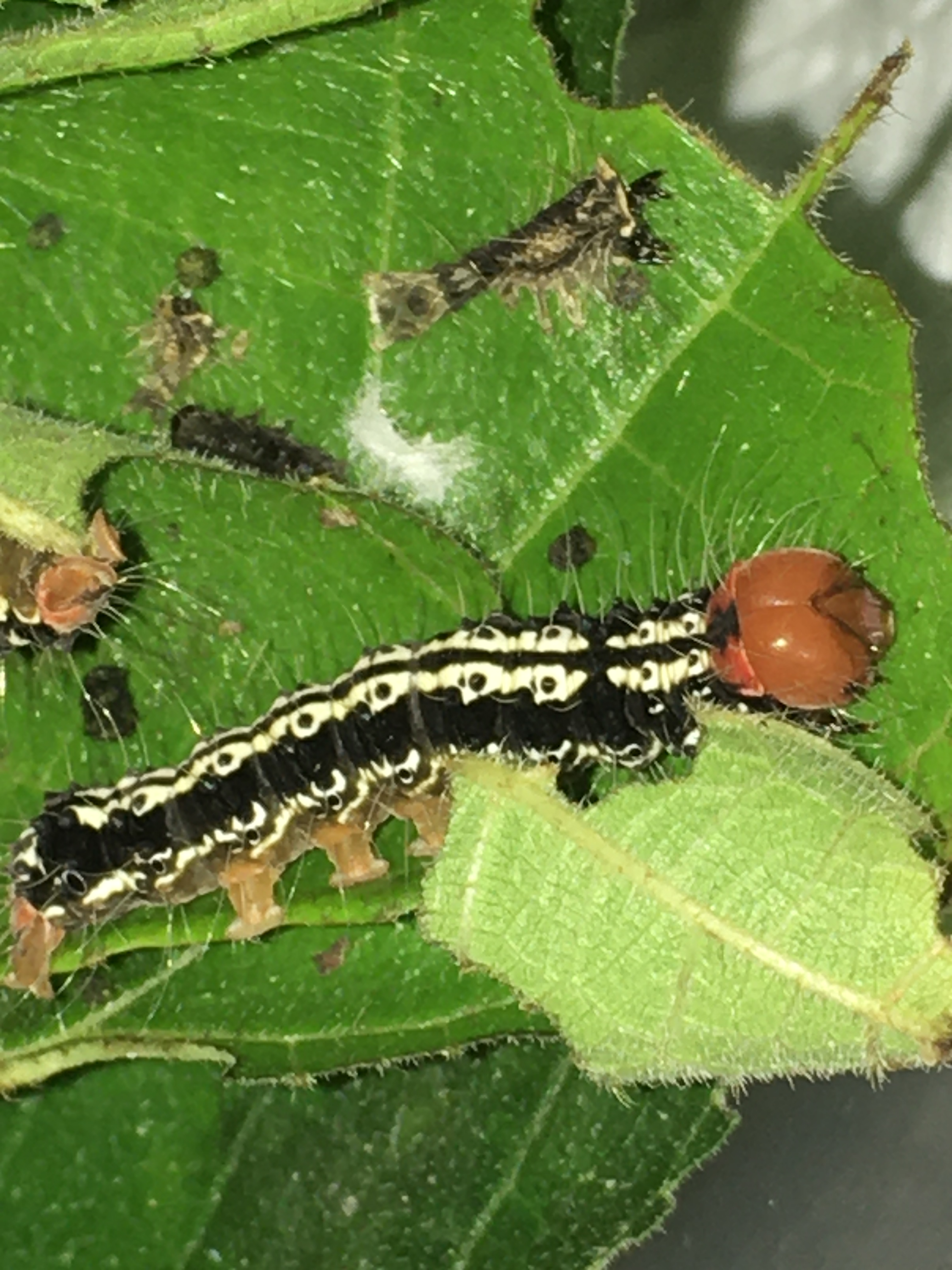
Asota caricae caricae larva

== Subspecies ==
There are three described subspecies:

- Asota caricae caricae Fabricius, 1775 (South East Asia, India, Bangladesh, Indonesia, China to Papua New Guinea)
- Asota caricae euroa Rothschild, 1897 (Solomon Islands)
- Asota caricae melanesiensis Viette, 1951 (Melanesia)
