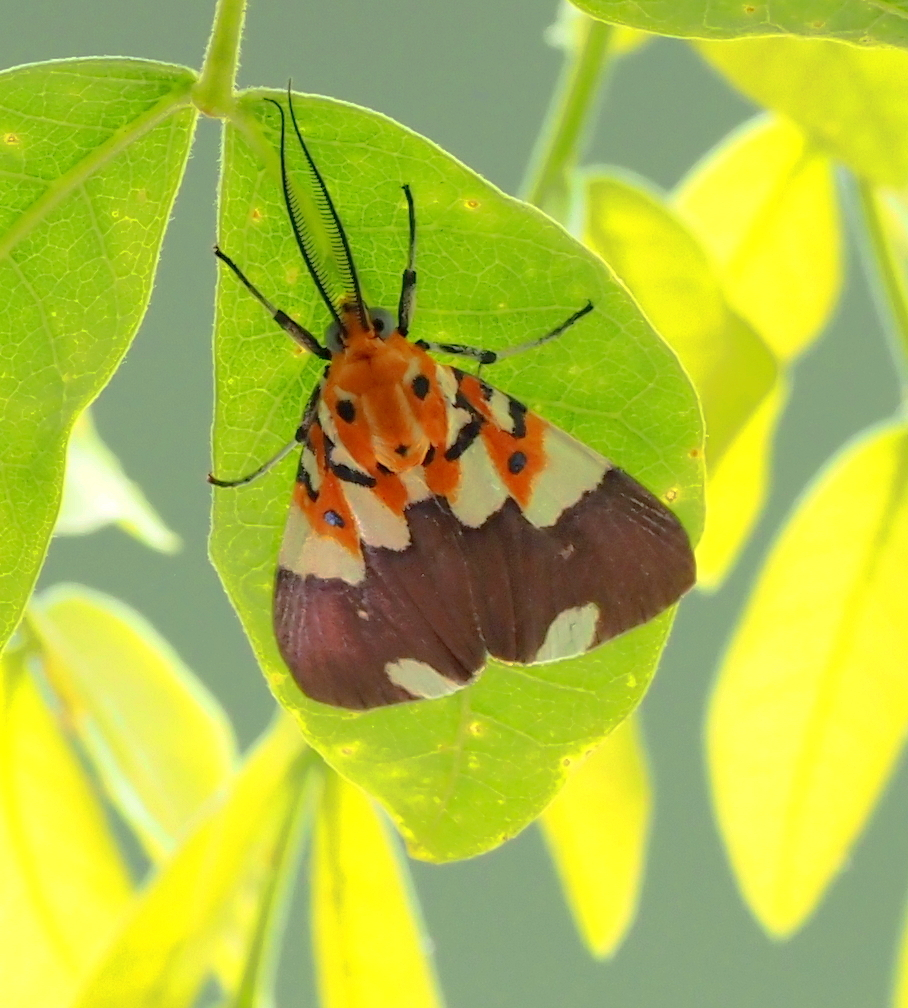

Scientific classification
- Kingdom: Animalia
- Phylum: Arthropoda
- Clade: Pancrustacea
- Class: Insecta
- Order: Lepidoptera
- Superfamily: Noctuoidea
- Family: Erebidae
- Genus: Asota
- Species: A. woodfordi

Binomial name
- Asota woodfordi Druce, 1888

= Asota woodfordi =

Species of moth

Asota woodfordi is a species of moth in the family Erebidae that was first described by Druce in 1888. It occurs in the Fiji Islands and New Caledonia.

The wingspan is 44–50 mm.
