= Asota carsina =

Scientific classification
- Domain: Eukaryota
- Kingdom: Animalia
- Phylum: Arthropoda
- Class: Insecta
- Order: Lepidoptera
- Superfamily: Noctuoidea
- Family: Erebidae
- Genus: Asota
- Species: A. carsina

Binomial name
- Asota carsina Swinhoe, 1906

Species of moth

Asota carsina is a moth of the family Erebidae first described by Swinhoe in 1906. It is found on Nias.
