= Asota orbona =

Scientific classification
- Domain: Eukaryota
- Kingdom: Animalia
- Phylum: Arthropoda
- Class: Insecta
- Order: Lepidoptera
- Superfamily: Noctuoidea
- Family: Erebidae
- Genus: Asota
- Species: A. orbona

Binomial name
- Asota orbona (Vollenhoven, 1863)

Synonyms
- Hypsa orbona Vollenhoven, 1863; Asota discoidalis Rothschild, 1897; Asota ocellata Rothschild, 1897; Asota ochrealis Swinhoe, 1892; Asota queenslandica Rothschild, 1897; Hypsa significans Walker, 1864; Asota intermedia Joicey & Noakes, 1915; Asota talboti Proud, 1920; Asota intermedia extrema Roepke 1939; Asota striata Roepke, 1939

Species of moth

Asota orbona is a moth of the family Erebidae first described by Samuel Constantinus Snellen van Vollenhoven in 1863. It is found in Indonesia, Papua New Guinea and Queensland.

The wing is yellowish with brown shading. It has four spots on its forewing with black dots on the thorax and the bases of the forewing. The wingspan is about 50 mm.

The larvae feed on Ficus species.

== Subspecies ==
- Asota orbona discoidalis (Seram)
- Asota orbona ocellata (Papua New Guinea)
- Asota orbona ochrealis (Ambon, Kai Islands, Seram)
- Asota orbona orbona (Indonesia, Papua New Guinea)
- Asota orbona queenslandica (Queensland)
- Asota orbona significans (Indonesia, Papua New Guinea)
