= Asota spadix =

Scientific classification
- Domain: Eukaryota
- Kingdom: Animalia
- Phylum: Arthropoda
- Class: Insecta
- Order: Lepidoptera
- Superfamily: Noctuoidea
- Family: Erebidae
- Genus: Asota
- Species: A. spadix

Binomial name
- Asota spadix C. Swinhoe, 1901

Synonyms
- Asota ochreibasis Pagenstecher

Species of moth

Asota spadix is a moth of the family Erebidae first described by Charles Swinhoe in 1901. It is found in Micronesia and the Solomon Islands.
