= Asota fereunicolor =

Scientific classification
- Kingdom: Animalia
- Phylum: Arthropoda
- Class: Insecta
- Order: Lepidoptera
- Superfamily: Noctuoidea
- Family: Erebidae
- Genus: Asota
- Species: A. fereunicolor

Binomial name
- Asota fereunicolor (Toulgoët, 1972)

Synonyms
- Aganais fereunicolor Toulgoët, 1972

Species of moth

Asota fereunicolor is a moth of the family Erebidae first described by Hervé de Toulgoët in 1972. It is found on the Comores in the Indian Ocean.
