= Asota circularis =

Scientific classification
- Domain: Eukaryota
- Kingdom: Animalia
- Phylum: Arthropoda
- Class: Insecta
- Order: Lepidoptera
- Superfamily: Noctuoidea
- Family: Erebidae
- Genus: Asota
- Species: A. circularis

Binomial name
- Asota circularis Reich, 1938

Species of moth

Asota circularis is a moth of the family Erebidae. It was first described by Paul Reich in 1938 based on specimen(s) from "New Mecklenburg" (now New Ireland Province, Papua New Guinea).
