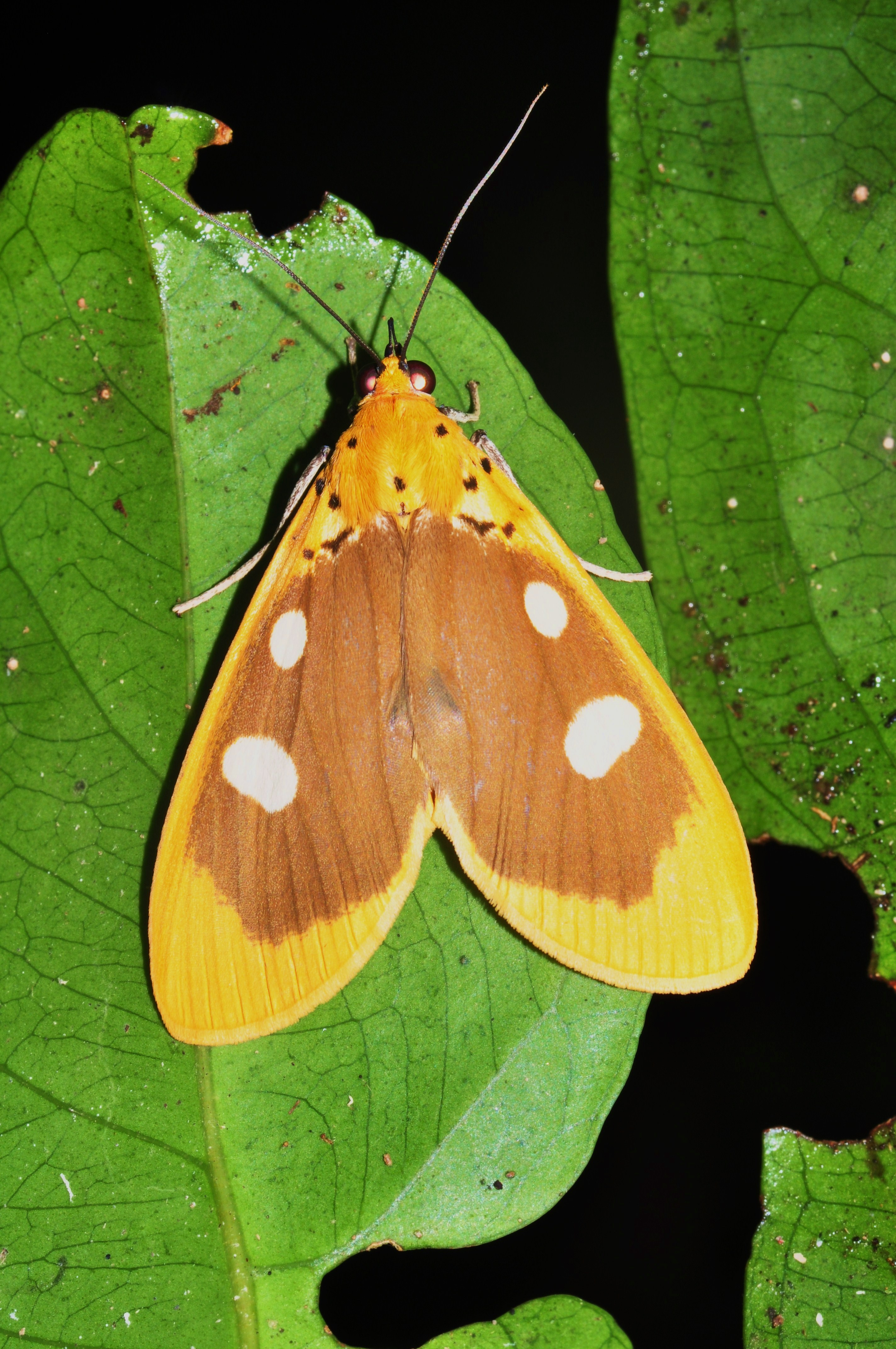

Scientific classification
- Domain: Eukaryota
- Kingdom: Animalia
- Phylum: Arthropoda
- Class: Insecta
- Order: Lepidoptera
- Superfamily: Noctuoidea
- Family: Erebidae
- Genus: Asota
- Species: A. javana

Binomial name
- Asota javana (Cramer, 1780)

Synonyms
- Phalaena javana Cramer, 1780; Asota fiaviventris Rothschild, 1897

= Asota javana =

Species of moth

Asota javana is a moth of the family Erebidae first described by Pieter Cramer in 1780. It is found in Sundaland, the Philippines, Sulawesi and on Sula Island.

The wingspan is 57–68 mm.

== Subspecies ==
- Asota javana celebensis (Sulawesi)
- Asota javana deliana (Sumatra)
- Asota javana flaviventris (Seram, Sulawesi, Philippines)
- Asota javana javana (Borneo, Boeton, Java, Sulawesi, Myanmar)
