= Asota avacta =

Scientific classification
- Domain: Eukaryota
- Kingdom: Animalia
- Phylum: Arthropoda
- Class: Insecta
- Order: Lepidoptera
- Superfamily: Noctuoidea
- Family: Erebidae
- Genus: Asota
- Species: A. avacta

Binomial name
- Asota avacta C. Swinhoe, 1892

Species of moth

Asota avacta is a moth of the family Erebidae first described by Charles Swinhoe in 1892. It is found in Indonesia and Malaysia.

The wingspan is 54–57 mm.
