= Asota iodamia =

Scientific classification
- Domain: Eukaryota
- Kingdom: Animalia
- Phylum: Arthropoda
- Class: Insecta
- Order: Lepidoptera
- Superfamily: Noctuoidea
- Family: Erebidae
- Genus: Asota
- Species: A. iodamia

Binomial name
- Asota iodamia (Herrich-Schäffer, 1854)

Synonyms
- Aganais iodamia Herrich-Schäffer, 1850; Hypsa sphaerifera Butler, 1875; Hypsa nesophora Meyrick, 1886

Species of moth

Asota iodamia is a moth of the family Erebidae first described by Gottlieb August Wilhelm Herrich-Schäffer in 1854. It is found in the Australian states of New South Wales and Queensland.
