= Asota isthmia =

Scientific classification
- Kingdom: Animalia
- Phylum: Arthropoda
- Class: Insecta
- Order: Lepidoptera
- Superfamily: Noctuoidea
- Family: Erebidae
- Genus: Asota
- Species: A. isthmia

Binomial name
- Asota isthmia (Walker, 1856)

Synonyms
- Hypsa isthmia Walker, 1856

Species of moth

Asota isthmia is a moth of the family Erebidae first described by Francis Walker in 1856. It is found in China, Indonesia, Papua New Guinea and the Philippines.

It has a wingspan is 59-63 millimeters.
