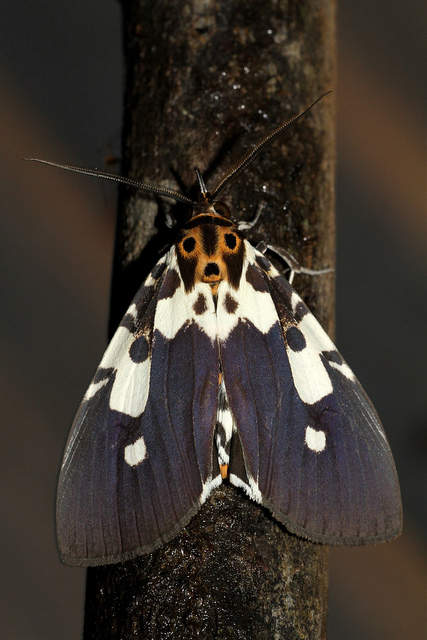
- Trusmadi area, hill mixed dipterocarp forest

Scientific classification
- Kingdom: Animalia
- Phylum: Arthropoda
- Clade: Pancrustacea
- Class: Insecta
- Order: Lepidoptera
- Superfamily: Noctuoidea
- Family: Erebidae
- Genus: Asota
- Species: A. kinabaluensis

Binomial name
- Asota kinabaluensis Rothschild, 1896

= Asota kinabaluensis =

Species of moth

Asota kinabaluensis is a species of noctuoid moth in the family Erebidae first described by Walter Rothschild in 1896. It appears to have no close relatives in the genus Asota.

== Characteristics ==
The wingspan is 62–64 mm. The forewing pattern is very distinctive with the patchy, very dark brownish-gray and white colors. The abdominal segments have complete black rings. The male antennae are the most strongly bipectinate in the Asota genus. The aedeagus vesica bears a massive tuft of numerous fine spines.

== Distribution and habitat ==
The species is endemic to Borneo. The first specimens were collected from Mount Kinabalu after which the species was named. A. kinabaluensis prefers upper montane forests, but can be found also in hill forests ranging from 1000 to 2600 m.
