= Asota strigosa =

Scientific classification
- Domain: Eukaryota
- Kingdom: Animalia
- Phylum: Arthropoda
- Class: Insecta
- Order: Lepidoptera
- Superfamily: Noctuoidea
- Family: Erebidae
- Genus: Asota
- Species: A. strigosa

Binomial name
- Asota strigosa (Boisduval, 1832)

Synonyms
- Aganais strigosa Boisduval, 1832

Species of moth

Asota strigosa is a moth of the family Erebidae first described by Jean Baptiste Boisduval in 1832. It is found in Indonesia and the Papua New Guinea.

It is a rare species that prefers lowlands and moderate climate. However, it may also be found at high altitudes.

Its wingspan is generally around 53 mm.
