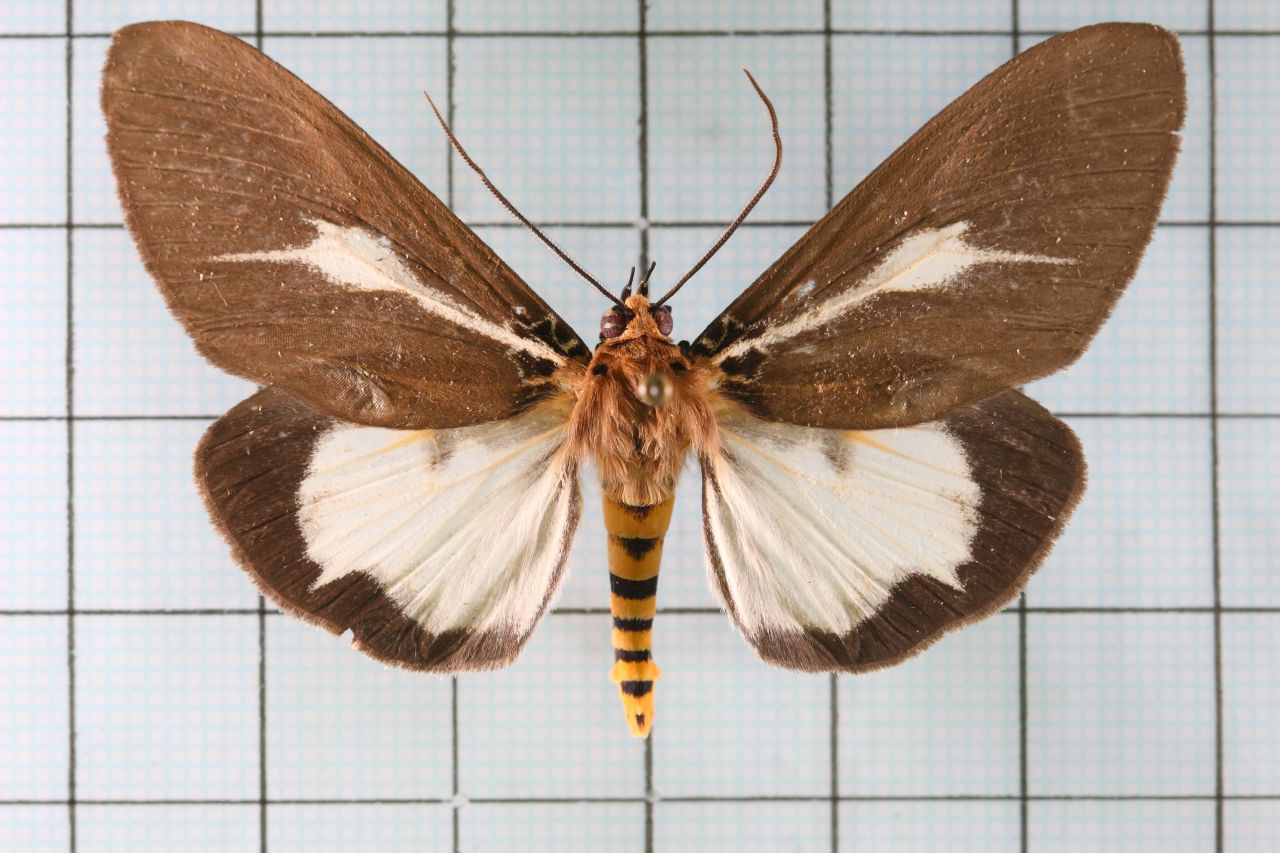
- Asota heliconia zebrina
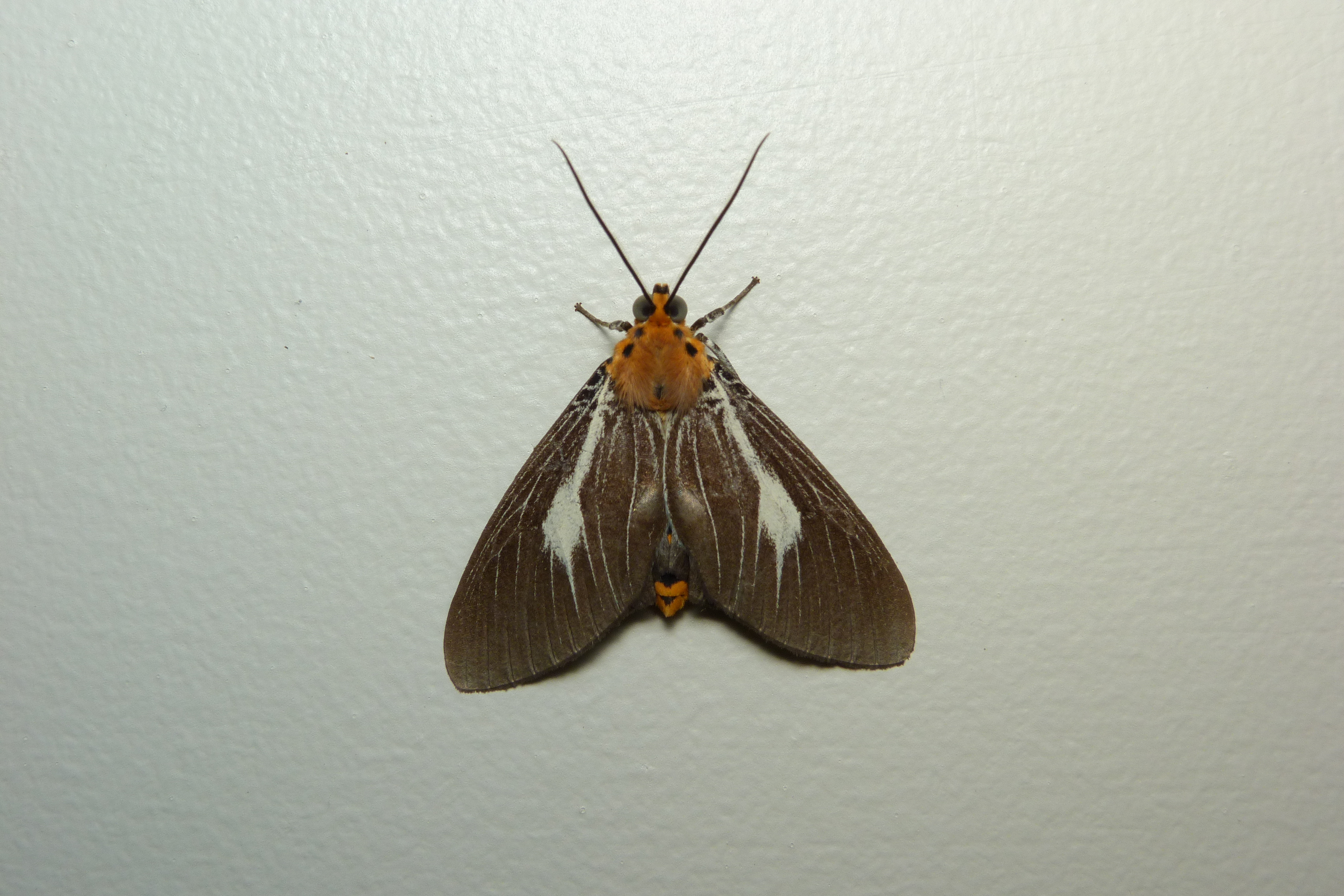

Scientific classification
- Kingdom: Animalia
- Phylum: Arthropoda
- Class: Insecta
- Order: Lepidoptera
- Superfamily: Noctuoidea
- Family: Erebidae
- Genus: Asota
- Species: A. heliconia

Binomial name
- Asota heliconia (Linnaeus, 1758)

Synonyms
- Phalaena heliconia Linnaeus, 1758; Noctua dama Fabricius, 1775; Phalaena Attacus monycha Cramer, 1779; Phalaena Bombyx silvandra Stoll, 1782; Aganais doryca Boisduval, 1832; Hypsa intacta Walker, 1854; Hypsa lanceolata Walker, 1856; Hypsa clavata Butler, 1875; Hypsa dicta Butler, 1875; Hypsa zebrina Butler, 1877; Hypsa venalba Moore, 1877; Aganais leuconeura Butler, 1879; Hypsa perimele Weymer, 1885; Hypsa semifusca Butler, 1887; Hypsa nicobarica Swinhoe, 1892; Hypsa ghara Swinhoe, 1892; Hypsa malisa Swinhoe, 1892; Hypsa lara Swinhoe, 1893; Asota timorana Rothschild, 1896; Asota kalaonica Rothschild, 1896; Asota riukiuana Rothschild, 1896; Asota philippina Rothschild, 1896; Asota sangirensis Rothschild, 1896; Asota bandana Rothschild, 1896; Asota murina Rothschild, 1896; Asota natunensis Rothschild, 1896; Asota enganensis Rothschild, 1896; Asota kiriwinae Rothschild, 1896; Asota dicta extensa Rothschild, 1896; Asota bandana diluta Rothschild, 1896; Asota heliconia brevipennis Rothschild, 1896; Asota heliconia nervosa Rothschild, 1896; Asota extensa Seitz, 1914; Asota atrata Jordan, 1924

= Asota heliconia =

Species of moth

Asota heliconia is a moth in the family Erebidae. It is found from the Indo-Australian tropics east to Queensland and the Solomons.

The wingspan is 52 mm.

Larvae have been recorded on Averrhoa species.

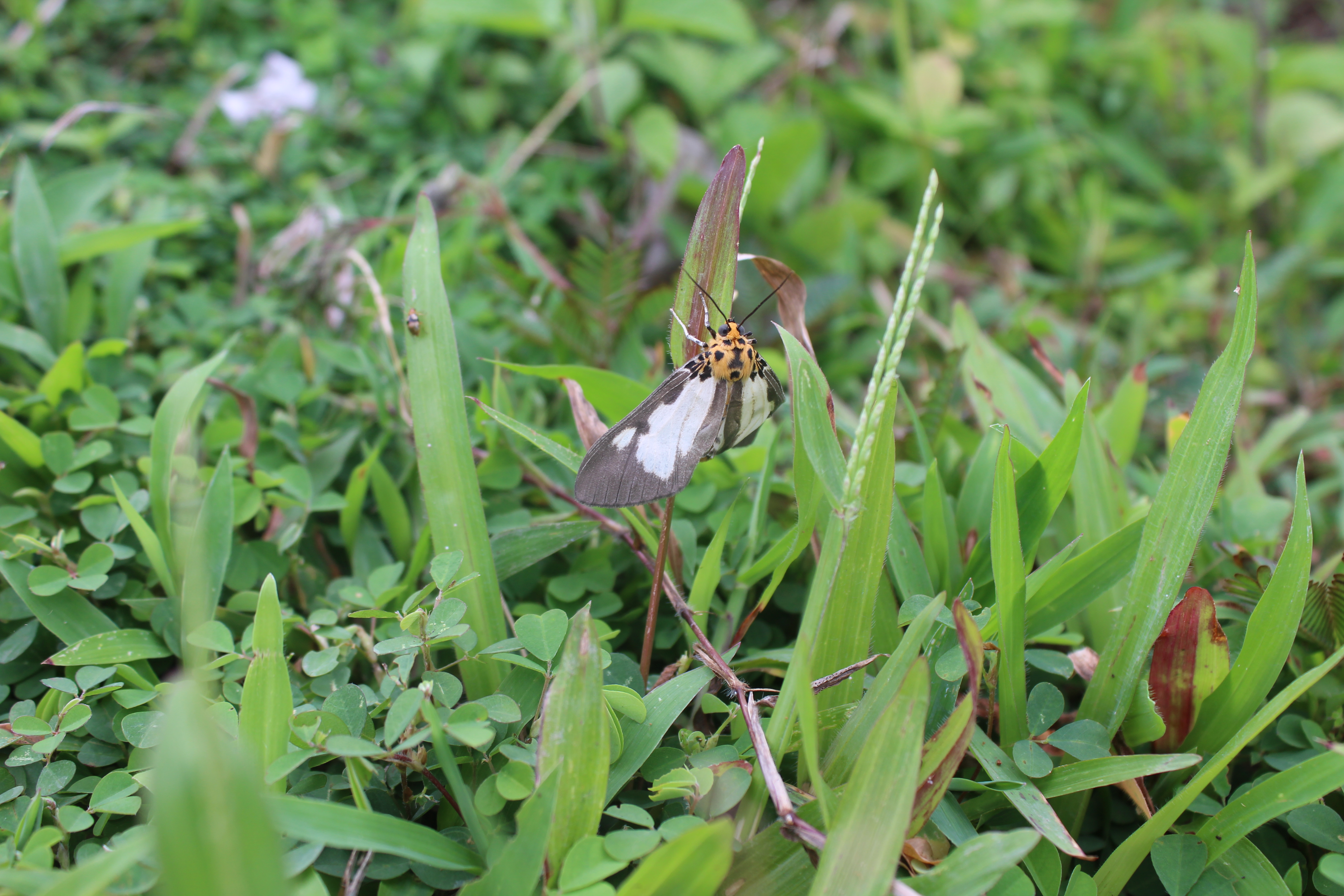
Asota heliconia philippina ( Albay, Philippines)

== Subspecies ==
- Asota heliconia atrata (Solomon Islands)
- Asota heliconia bandana (Kayao island, Banda Elat)
- Asota heliconia clavata (China, India, Myanmar, Thailand, northern Vietnam)
- Asota heliconia dama (Australia, New Zealand)
- Asota heliconia dicta (China, Indonesia, Malaysia, Philippines)
- Asota heliconia doryca (Indonesia, Papua New Guinea )
- Asota heliconia enganensis (Enggano)
- Asota heliconia ghara (Kai Islands)
- Asota heliconia heliconia (China, India, Indonesia, Malaysia, Papua New Guinea, Taiwan)
- Asota heliconia intacta (Indonesia)
- Asota heliconia kalaonica (Sulawesi)
- Asota heliconia kiriwinae (Trobiand Island)
- Asota heliconia lanceolata (Sulawesi)
- Asota heliconia latiradia (Babar island)
- Asota heliconia leuconeura (Indonesia, Papua New Guinea)
- Asota heliconia malisa (Indonesia)
- Asota heliconia natunensis (Indonesia)
- Asota heliconia nicobarica (Nicobar Islands)
- Asota heliconia perimele (Indonesia)
- Asota heliconia philippina (Philippines)
- Asota heliconia sangirensis (Indonesia)
- Asota heliconia semifusca (Papua New Guinea, Solomon Islands)
- Asota heliconia timorana (East Timor, Indonesia)
- Asota heliconia toekangbesiensis (Tomea island)
- Asota heliconia unicolor (Indonesia)
- Asota heliconia venalba (Andaman Islands)
- Asota heliconia zebrina (Taiwan)
