= Asota diastropha =

Scientific classification
- Kingdom: Animalia
- Phylum: Arthropoda
- Clade: Pancrustacea
- Class: Insecta
- Order: Lepidoptera
- Superfamily: Noctuoidea
- Family: Erebidae
- Genus: Asota
- Species: A. diastropha

Binomial name
- Asota diastropha (Prout, 1918)

Synonyms
- Aganais diastropha Prout, 1918

Species of moth

Asota diastropha is a moth of the family Erebidae first described by Louis Beethoven Prout in 1918. It is found in Madagascar.
