= Asota albiformis =

Scientific classification
- Domain: Eukaryota
- Kingdom: Animalia
- Phylum: Arthropoda
- Class: Insecta
- Order: Lepidoptera
- Superfamily: Noctuoidea
- Family: Erebidae
- Genus: Asota
- Species: A. albiformis

Binomial name
- Asota albiformis (C. Swinhoe, 1892)

Synonyms
- Hypsa albiformis C. Swinhoe, 1892

Species of moth

Asota albiformis is a moth of the family Erebidae first described by Charles Swinhoe in 1892. It is found in Borneo, the Philippines, Sulawesi and the Moluccas.

The wingspan is about 56 mm.

== Subspecies ==
- Asota albiformis albiformis (Indonesia, Malaysia, Philippines)
- Asota albiformis ternatensis (Indonesia)
