= Asota sulamangoliensis =

Scientific classification
- Kingdom: Animalia
- Phylum: Arthropoda
- Clade: Pancrustacea
- Class: Insecta
- Order: Lepidoptera
- Superfamily: Noctuoidea
- Family: Erebidae
- Genus: Asota
- Species: A. sulamangoliensis

Binomial name
- Asota sulamangoliensis Zwier, 2010

Species of moth

Asota sulamangoliensis is a moth of the family Erebidae first described by Jaap H. H. Zwier in 2010. It is found in Sula Mangoli in Maluku, Indonesia.
