= Asota buruensis =

Scientific classification
- Domain: Eukaryota
- Kingdom: Animalia
- Phylum: Arthropoda
- Class: Insecta
- Order: Lepidoptera
- Superfamily: Noctuoidea
- Family: Erebidae
- Genus: Asota
- Species: A. buruensis

Binomial name
- Asota buruensis Zwier, 2010

Species of moth

Asota buruensis is a moth of the family Erebidae first described by Jaap H. H. Zwier in 2010. It is found in Buru in Indonesia.
