= Asota suffusa =

Scientific classification
- Kingdom: Animalia
- Phylum: Arthropoda
- Class: Insecta
- Order: Lepidoptera
- Superfamily: Noctuoidea
- Family: Erebidae
- Genus: Asota
- Species: A. suffusa

Binomial name
- Asota suffusa (Snellen, 1891)

Synonyms
- Hypsa suffusa Snellen, 1891

Species of moth

Asota suffusa is a moth of the family Erebidae first described by Snellen in 1891. It is found on Alor Island, Flores and Sumbawa in Indonesia.

The wingspan is about 56 mm.
