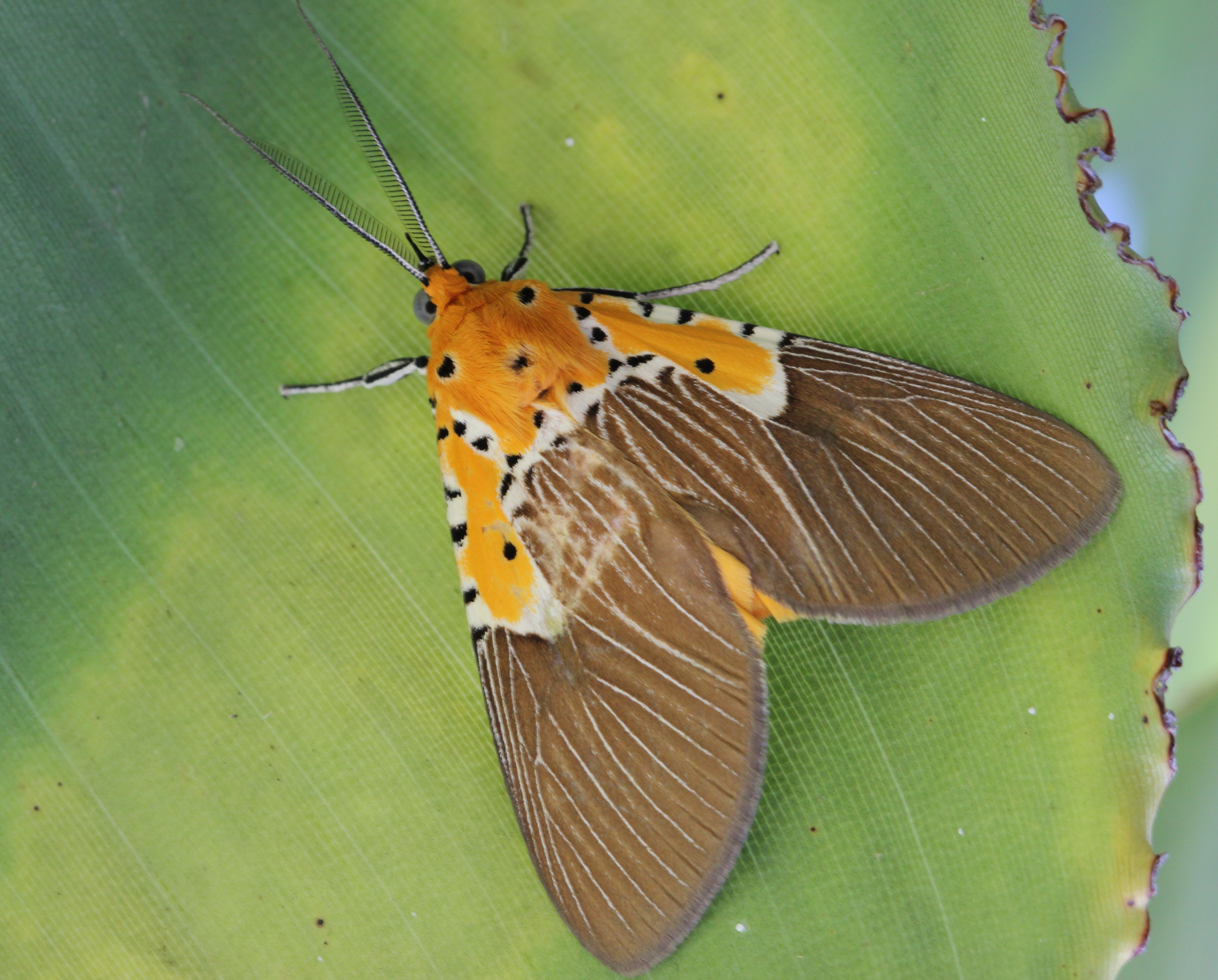
- Asota speciosa, South Africa

Scientific classification
- Kingdom: Animalia
- Phylum: Arthropoda
- Clade: Pancrustacea
- Class: Insecta
- Order: Lepidoptera
- Superfamily: Noctuoidea
- Family: Erebidae
- Subfamily: Aganainae
- Genus: Asota; Hübner, 1819

Synonyms
- Aganais; Antichera; Aspa; Damalis; Euimata; Hypsa; Lacides; Petalia; Psephea; Pseudhypsa

= Asota (moth) =

Genus of moths

Asota is a genus of moths in the family Erebidae first described by Jacob Hübner in 1819. Species are widely distributed throughout Africa, India, Sri Lanka, Myanmar, the Malayan region and tropical parts of the Australian region.

== Description ==
Palpi upturned, where the second joint reaching the vertex of the head and the third joint is slender in variable lengths. Antennae fasciculated (bundled) in males and ciliated (hairy) in females. Forewings with vein 5 from the lower angle of cell or just above it. Vein 6 from the upper angle or below it. Areole absent. Hindwings with vein 5 from just above lower angle of cell. Veins 6 and 7 from the upper angle.

== Taxonomy ==
The genus was formerly placed in the families Noctuidae and Arctiidae by some authors. Other authors placed them in the family Aganaidae or Hypsidae. Recent phylogenetic studies have shown that the Aganainae are most closely related to the Herminiinae (litter moths), and this pair of subfamilies is most closely related to the Arctiinae (tiger and lichen moths), all within the family Erebidae.

== Species ==
- Asota albiformis Swinhoe, 1892
- Asota albivena Walker, 1864
- Asota alienata Walker, 1864
- Asota antennalis Rothschild, 1897
- Asota australis Boisduval, 1832
- Asota avacta Swinhoe, 1892
- Asota borbonica Boisduval, 1833
- Asota brunnescens Nieuwenhuis, 1948
- Asota buruensis Zwier, 2010
- Asota caledonica Holloway, 1979
- Asota canaraica Moore, 1878
- Asota caricae Fabricius, 1775
- Asota carsina Swinhoe, 1906
- Asota chionea Mabille, 1878
- Asota circularis Reich, 1938
- Asota clara Butler, 1875
- Asota comorana Aurivillius, 1909
- Asota concinnula Mabille, 1878
- Asota concolora Swinhoe, 1903
- Asota contorta Aurivillius, 1894
- Asota darsania Druce, 1894
- Asota diana Butler, 1887
- Asota diastropha Prout, 1918
- Asota dohertyi Rothschild, 1897
- Asota egens (Walker, 1854)
- Asota eusemioides Felder, 1874
- Asota fereunicolor Toulgoët, 1972
- Asota ficus Fabricius, 1775
- Asota fulvia Donovan, 1805
- Asota heliconia (Linnaeus, 1758)
- Asota heliconioides Moore, 1878
- Asota iodamia Herrich Schäffer, 1854
- Asota isthmia Walker, 1856
- Asota javana Cramer, [1780]
- Asota kageri Kobes, 1988
- Asota kinabaluensis Rothschild, 1896
- Asota orbona Vollenhoven, 1863
- Asota paliura Swinhoe, 1893
- Asota paphos (Fabricius, 1787)
- Asota plagiata Walker, 1854
- Asota plaginota Butler, 1875
- Asota plana Walker, 1854
- Asota producta (Butler, 1875)
- Asota sericea Moore, 1878
- Asota spadix Swinhoe, 1901
- Asota speciosa Drury, 1773
- Asota strigosa Boisduval, 1832
- Asota sulamangoliensis Zwier, 2010
- Asota subsimilis Walker, 1864
- Asota suffusa Snellen, 1891
- Asota sulawesiensis Zwier, 2007
- Asota tigrina Butler, 1882
- Asota tortuosa Moore, 1872
- Asota trinacria Semper, 1899
- Asota woodfordi Druce, 1888

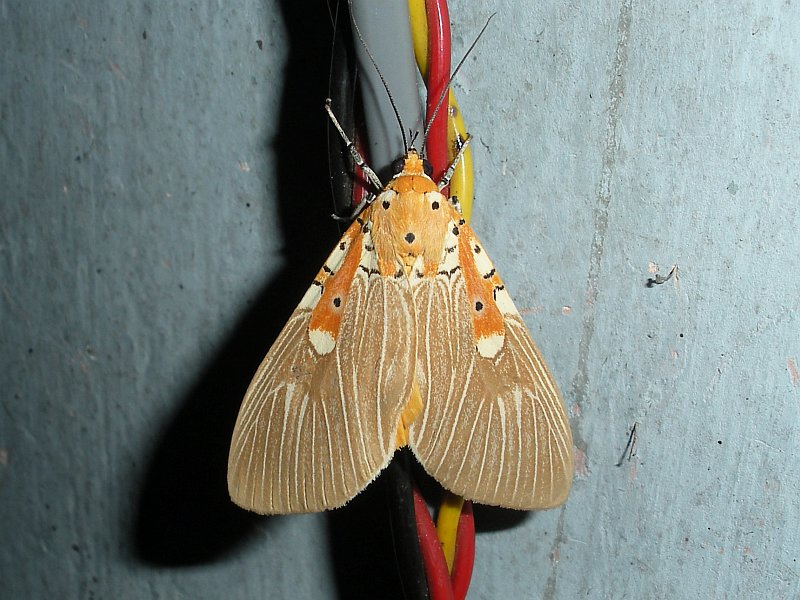
Asota ficus, probable female

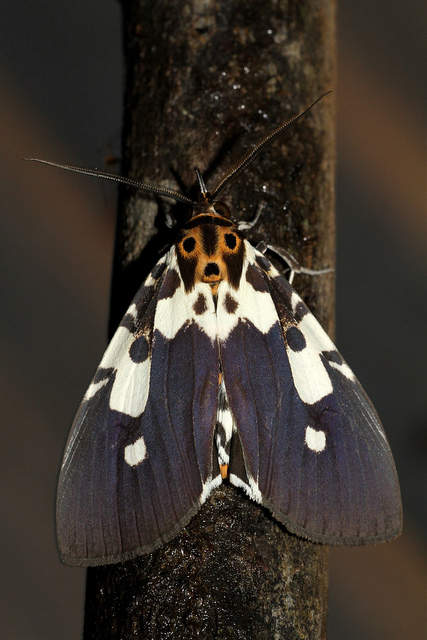
Asota kinabaluensis
