= Asota concolora =

Scientific classification
- Kingdom: Animalia
- Phylum: Arthropoda
- Class: Insecta
- Order: Lepidoptera
- Superfamily: Noctuoidea
- Family: Erebidae
- Genus: Asota
- Species: A. concolora

Binomial name
- Asota concolora (C. Swinhoe, 1903)

Synonyms
- Aganais concolora C. Swinhoe, 1903

Species of moth

Asota concolora is a moth of the family Erebidae first described by Charles Swinhoe in 1903. It is found on Madagascar.
