= Asota kageri =

Scientific classification
- Domain: Eukaryota
- Kingdom: Animalia
- Phylum: Arthropoda
- Class: Insecta
- Order: Lepidoptera
- Superfamily: Noctuoidea
- Family: Erebidae
- Genus: Asota
- Species: A. kageri

Binomial name
- Asota kageri Kobes, 1988

Species of moth

Asota kageri is a moth of the family Erebidae first described by Kobes in 1988. It is found on Borneo and Sumatra.

The wingspan is 29–31 mm.
