= Asota darsania =

Scientific classification
- Domain: Eukaryota
- Kingdom: Animalia
- Phylum: Arthropoda
- Class: Insecta
- Order: Lepidoptera
- Superfamily: Noctuoidea
- Family: Erebidae
- Genus: Asota
- Species: A. darsania

Binomial name
- Asota darsania (Druce, 1894)

Synonyms
- Hypsa darsania Druce, 1894

Species of moth

Asota darsania is a moth of the family Erebidae first described by Druce in 1894. It is found in Indonesia.

The wingspan is about 54 mm.
