= Asota sulawesiensis =

Scientific classification
- Domain: Eukaryota
- Kingdom: Animalia
- Phylum: Arthropoda
- Class: Insecta
- Order: Lepidoptera
- Superfamily: Noctuoidea
- Family: Erebidae
- Genus: Asota
- Species: A. sulawesiensis

Binomial name
- Asota sulawesiensis Zwier, 2007

Species of moth

Asota sulawesiensis is a moth of the family Erebidae first described by Jaap H. H. Zwier in 2007. It is endemic to Sulawesi.
