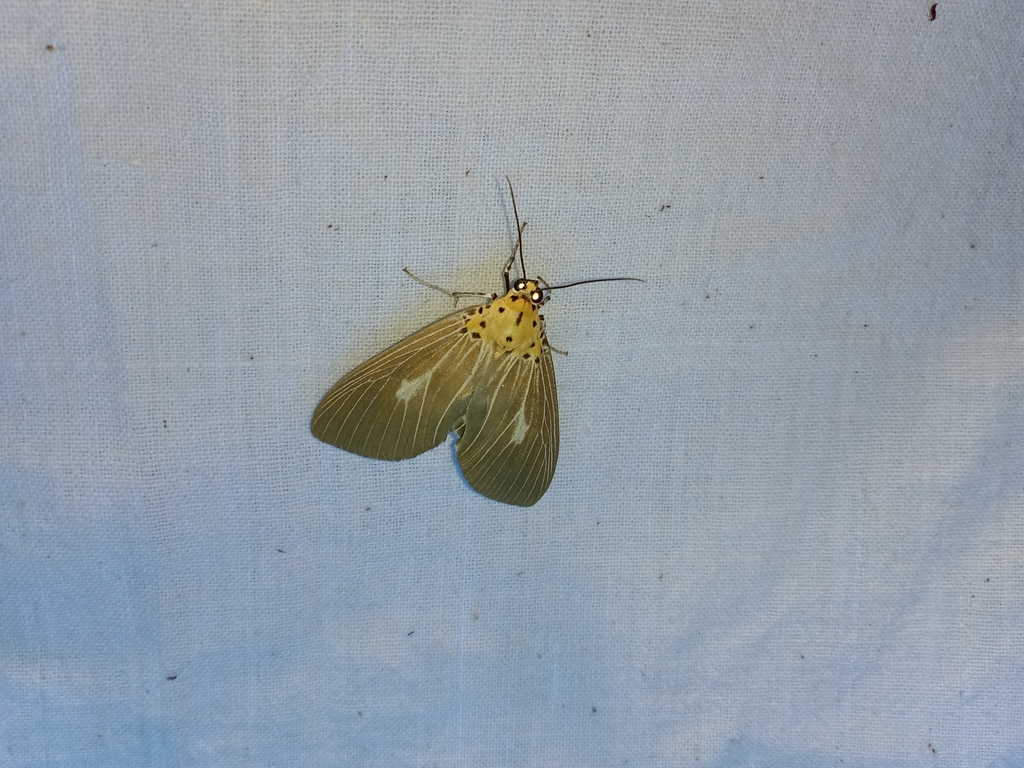

Scientific classification
- Domain: Eukaryota
- Kingdom: Animalia
- Phylum: Arthropoda
- Class: Insecta
- Order: Lepidoptera
- Superfamily: Noctuoidea
- Family: Erebidae
- Genus: Asota
- Species: A. canaraica

Binomial name
- Asota canaraica (Moore, 1878)

Synonyms
- Hypsa canaraica Moore, 1878

= Asota canaraica =

Species of moth

Asota canaraica is a moth of the family Erebidae first described by Frederic Moore in 1878. It is found in India and China.
