= Asota australis =

Scientific classification
- Domain: Eukaryota
- Kingdom: Animalia
- Phylum: Arthropoda
- Class: Insecta
- Order: Lepidoptera
- Superfamily: Noctuoidea
- Family: Erebidae
- Genus: Asota
- Species: A. australis

Binomial name
- Asota australis (Boisduval, 1832)

Synonyms
- Aganais australis Boisduval, 1832; Hypsa aequalis Walker, 1864; Asota sinuosa Rothschild, 1897; Asota septentrionalis Rothschild, 1897; Asota lineata Rothschild, 1897; Asota assimilis Rothschild, 1897

Species of moth

Asota australis is a moth of the family Erebidae first described by Jean Baptiste Boisduval in 1832. It is found in Australia, Indonesia and Papua New Guinea.

The wingspan is about 50 mm.

== Subspecies ==
- Asota australis assimilis (Northern Territory, Queensland)
- Asota australis australis (Indonesia, Papua New Guinea)
- Asota australis sinuosa (Indonesia)
