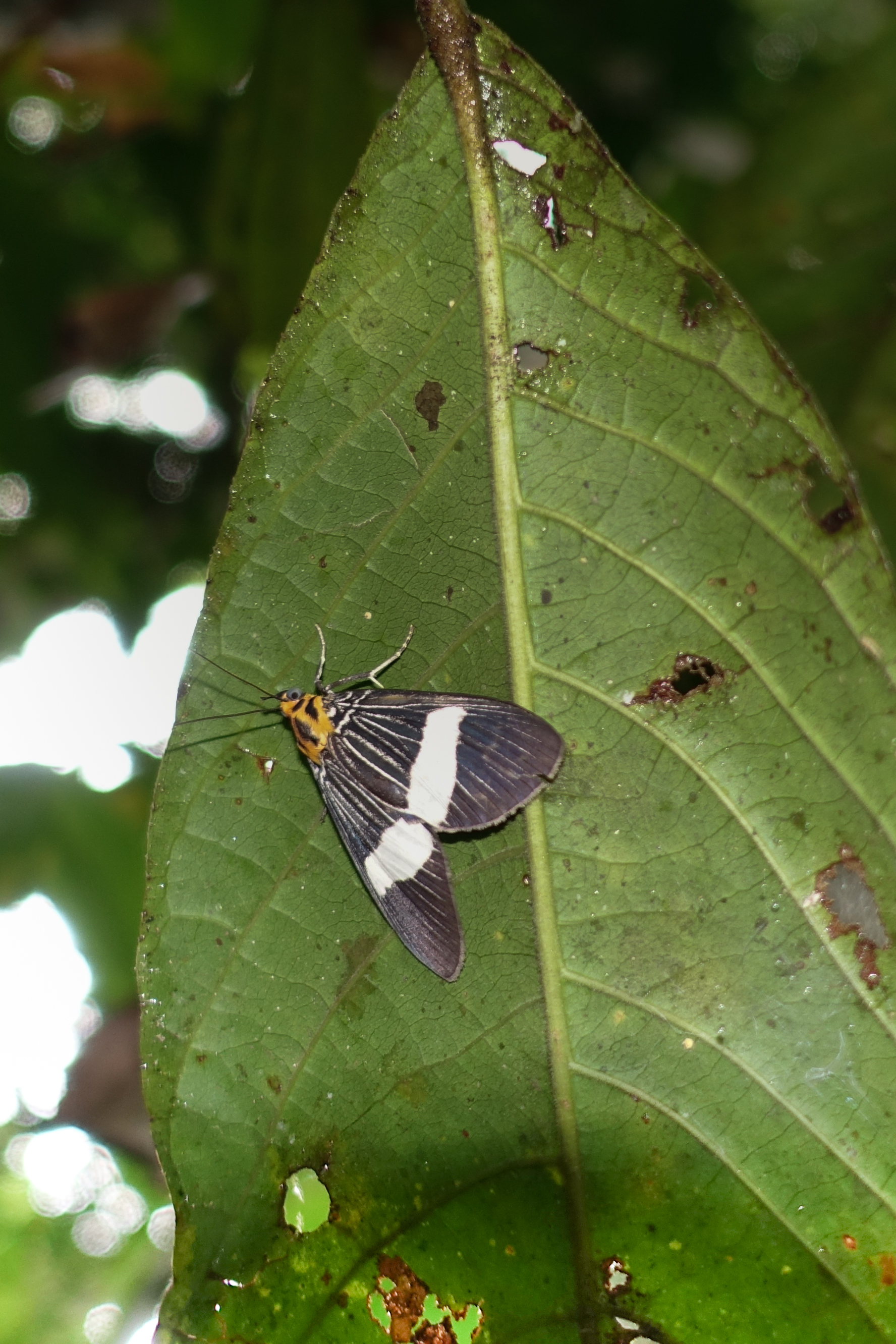

Scientific classification
- Domain: Eukaryota
- Kingdom: Animalia
- Phylum: Arthropoda
- Class: Insecta
- Order: Lepidoptera
- Superfamily: Noctuoidea
- Family: Erebidae
- Genus: Asota
- Species: A. eusemioides

Binomial name
- Asota eusemioides Felder, 1874

Synonyms
- Noctua versicolor Fabricius, 1794; Asota subrupta Rothschild, 1897

= Asota eusemioides =

Species of moth

Asota eusemioides is a moth of the family Erebidae first described by Felder in 1874. It is found in Papua New Guinea and Indonesia.

The wingspan is 50–59 mm (2.0–2.3 in).

== Subspecies ==
- Asota eusemioides eusemioides (Papua New Guinea)
- Asota eusemioides subrupta (Papua New Guinea, Indonesia)
