= Asota albivena =

Scientific classification
- Kingdom: Animalia
- Phylum: Arthropoda
- Class: Insecta
- Order: Lepidoptera
- Superfamily: Noctuoidea
- Family: Erebidae
- Genus: Asota
- Species: A. albivena

Binomial name
- Asota albivena (Walker, 1864)

Synonyms
- Hypsa albivena Walker, 1864; Asota vitessoides Snellen, 1879

Species of moth

Asota albivena is a moth of the family Erebidae first described by Francis Walker in 1864. It is found in Sulawesi, Maluku and the Kai Islands.

The wingspan is about 57 mm.
