= Asota trinacria =

Scientific classification
- Domain: Eukaryota
- Kingdom: Animalia
- Phylum: Arthropoda
- Class: Insecta
- Order: Lepidoptera
- Superfamily: Noctuoidea
- Family: Erebidae
- Genus: Asota
- Species: A. trinacria

Binomial name
- Asota trinacria Semper, 1899

Synonyms
- Asota belophora West, 1932

Species of moth

Asota trinacria is a moth of the family Erebidae first described by Georg Semper in 1899. It is found in Borneo, Seram and the Philippines (Leyte, Luzon, Mindoro and Mindanao).
