= Asota paphos =

Scientific classification
- Domain: Eukaryota
- Kingdom: Animalia
- Phylum: Arthropoda
- Class: Insecta
- Order: Lepidoptera
- Superfamily: Noctuoidea
- Family: Erebidae
- Genus: Asota
- Species: A. paphos

Binomial name
- Asota paphos (Fabricius, 1787)

Synonyms
- Noctua paphos Fabricius, 1787

Species of moth

Asota paphos is a moth of the family Erebidae first described by Johan Christian Fabricius in 1787. It is found from the north-eastern Himalayas to Sundaland.

The wingspan is 55–59 mm.

== Subspecies ==
- Asota paphos leuconota (Indonesia (Java, Sumatra), Philippines)
- Asota paphos paphos (China, India, Indonesia (Borneo, Sumatra), Malaysia, Philippines, Singapore)
