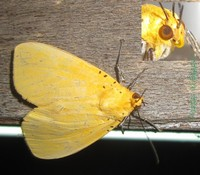

Scientific classification
- Domain: Eukaryota
- Kingdom: Animalia
- Phylum: Arthropoda
- Class: Insecta
- Order: Lepidoptera
- Superfamily: Noctuoidea
- Family: Erebidae
- Genus: Asota
- Species: A. borbonica

Binomial name
- Asota borbonica Boisduval, 1833

Synonyms
- Aganais borbonica Boisduval, 1833; Aganais insularis Boisduval, 1833; Aganais iodamia Herrich-Schäffer, 1854; Hypsa antica Walker, 1856; Hypsa stipata Walker, 1865

= Asota borbonica =

Species of moth

Asota borbonica is a moth of the family Erebidae. It is found in Africa, including South Africa, Mauritius, Réunion and Madagascar.
