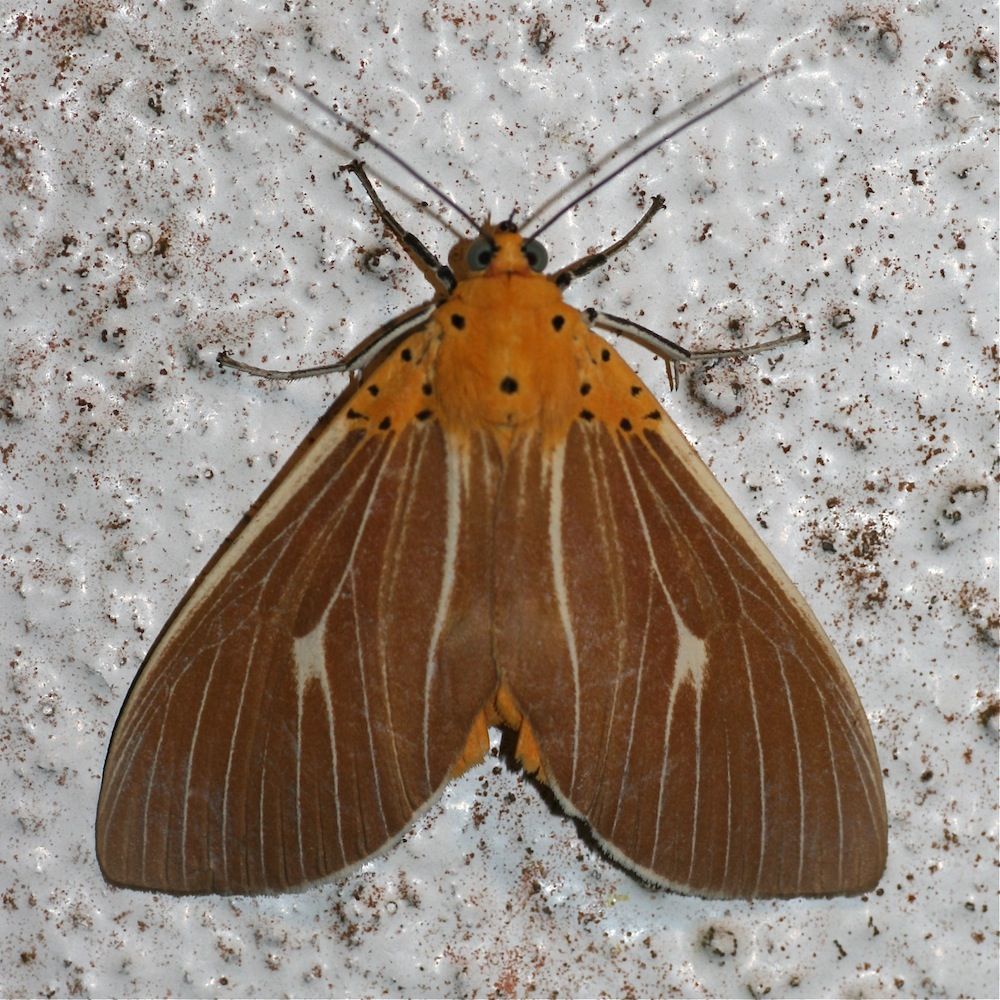
- West Malaysia, Fraser's Hill

Scientific classification
- Domain: Eukaryota
- Kingdom: Animalia
- Phylum: Arthropoda
- Class: Insecta
- Order: Lepidoptera
- Superfamily: Noctuoidea
- Family: Erebidae
- Genus: Asota
- Species: A. producta

Binomial name
- Asota producta (Butler, 1875)

Synonyms
- Hypsa producta Butler, 1875; Hypsa strigivenata Butler, 1875; Asota producta stigmatica Rothschild, 1897

= Asota producta =

Species of moth

Asota producta is a species of noctuoid moth in the family Erebidae. It is found from Sri Lanka and India to Sundaland.

== Description ==
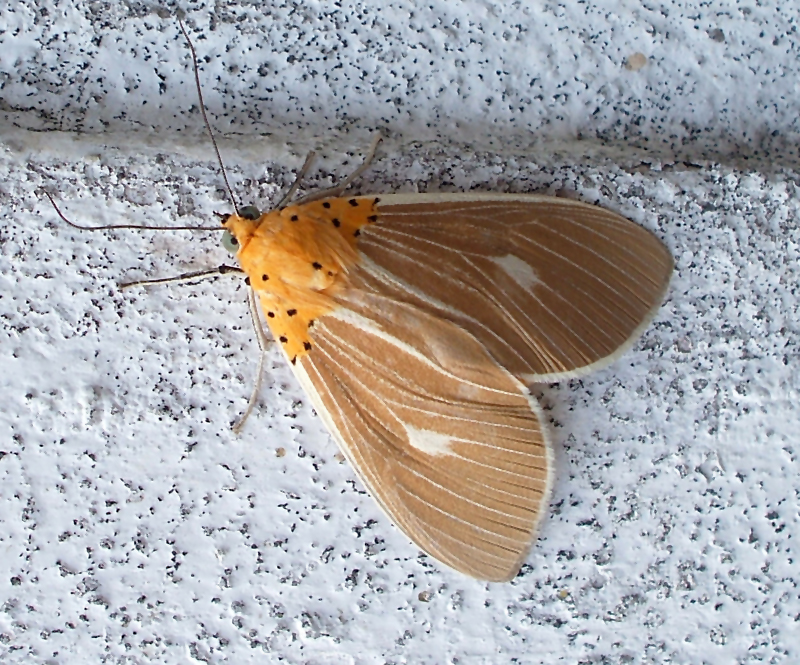

The wingspan is 60–71 mm. Forewing has a basal orange patch which extending further along the costa with an extra black spot on the costa. Some subspecies have darker orange and brown colors. Larva has large head. There is a series of dorsal tubercles from 4th to terminal somite. Purplish brown with sparse hairs, the thoracic somites pale above. Some pale lateral spots present. There is a dorsal black line with oblique dorsal streaks found on somites seven to ten.
