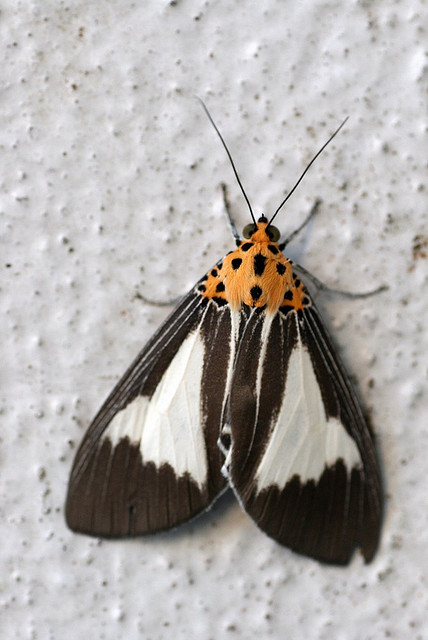
- Asota clara donatana, West Malaysia

Scientific classification
- Kingdom: Animalia
- Phylum: Arthropoda
- Clade: Pancrustacea
- Class: Insecta
- Order: Lepidoptera
- Superfamily: Noctuoidea
- Family: Erebidae
- Genus: Asota
- Species: A. clara

Binomial name
- Asota clara (Butler, 1875)

Synonyms
- Hypsa clara Butler, 1875

= Asota clara =

Species of moth

Asota clara is a species of noctuoid moth in the family Erebidae first described by Arthur Gardiner Butler in 1875. It is found in Indonesia, Peninsular Malaysia and Myanmar.

The wingspan is 54–58 mm.

== Subspecies ==
- Asota clara clara (Indonesia)
- Asota clara donatana (Indonesia, Peninsular Malaysia, Myanmar)
