= Asota caledonica =

Scientific classification
- Kingdom: Animalia
- Phylum: Arthropoda
- Clade: Pancrustacea
- Class: Insecta
- Order: Lepidoptera
- Superfamily: Noctuoidea
- Family: Erebidae
- Genus: Asota
- Species: A. caledonica

Binomial name
- Asota caledonica Holloway, 1979

Species of moth

Asota caledonica is a moth of the family Erebidae first described by Jeremy Daniel Holloway in 1979. It is found in New Caledonia.
