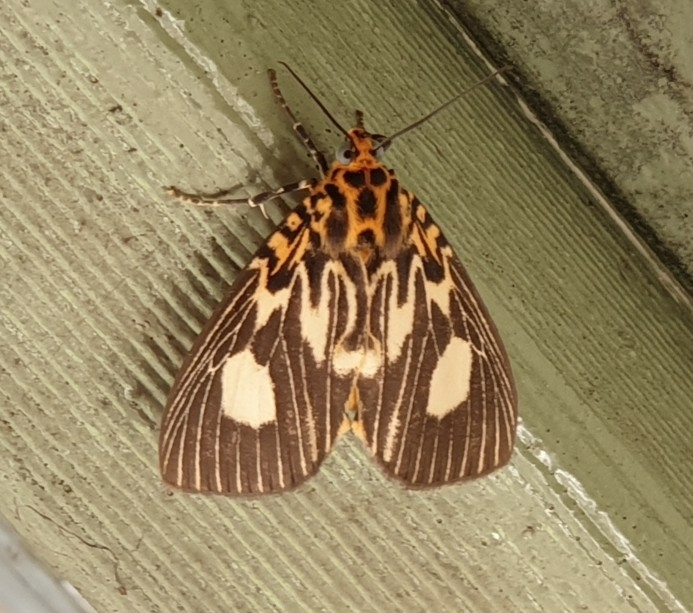

Scientific classification
- Kingdom: Animalia
- Phylum: Arthropoda
- Class: Insecta
- Order: Lepidoptera
- Superfamily: Noctuoidea
- Family: Erebidae
- Genus: Asota
- Species: A. plagiata

Binomial name
- Asota plagiata (Walker, 1854)

Synonyms
- Hypsa plagiata Walker, 1854; Hypsa discreta Walker [1865]; Hypsa henschkei Hulstaert, 1924

= Asota plagiata =

Species of moth

Asota plagiata, the two-spots tiger moth, is a moth of the family Erebidae first described by Francis Walker in 1854. It is found in the northern half of Australia.

The wingspan is 49–58 mm.

The larvae are confirmed to feed on Ficus macrophylla and other native ficus species.
