= Asota chionea =

Scientific classification
- Kingdom: Animalia
- Phylum: Arthropoda
- Class: Insecta
- Order: Lepidoptera
- Superfamily: Noctuoidea
- Family: Erebidae
- Genus: Asota
- Species: A. chionea

Binomial name
- Asota chionea Mabille, 1878

Species of moth

Asota chionea is a moth of the family Erebidae first described by Paul Mabille in 1878. It is found in Zaire.
