= Asota paliura =

Scientific classification
- Domain: Eukaryota
- Kingdom: Animalia
- Phylum: Arthropoda
- Class: Insecta
- Order: Lepidoptera
- Superfamily: Noctuoidea
- Family: Erebidae
- Genus: Asota
- Species: A. paliura

Binomial name
- Asota paliura (C. Swinhoe, 1893)

Synonyms
- Hypsa paliura C. Swinhoe, 1893

Species of moth

Asota paliura is a moth of the family Erebidae first described by Charles Swinhoe in 1893. It is found in China and Thailand.

The wingspan is about 61 mm.
