= Asota antennalis =

Scientific classification
- Domain: Eukaryota
- Kingdom: Animalia
- Phylum: Arthropoda
- Class: Insecta
- Order: Lepidoptera
- Superfamily: Noctuoidea
- Family: Erebidae
- Genus: Asota
- Species: A. antennalis

Binomial name
- Asota antennalis Rothschild, 1897

Species of moth

Asota antennalis is a moth of the family Erebidae first described by Walter Rothschild in 1897. It is found on Sulawesi and the Sumatra.

The moth has a wingspan of about 61 mm.
