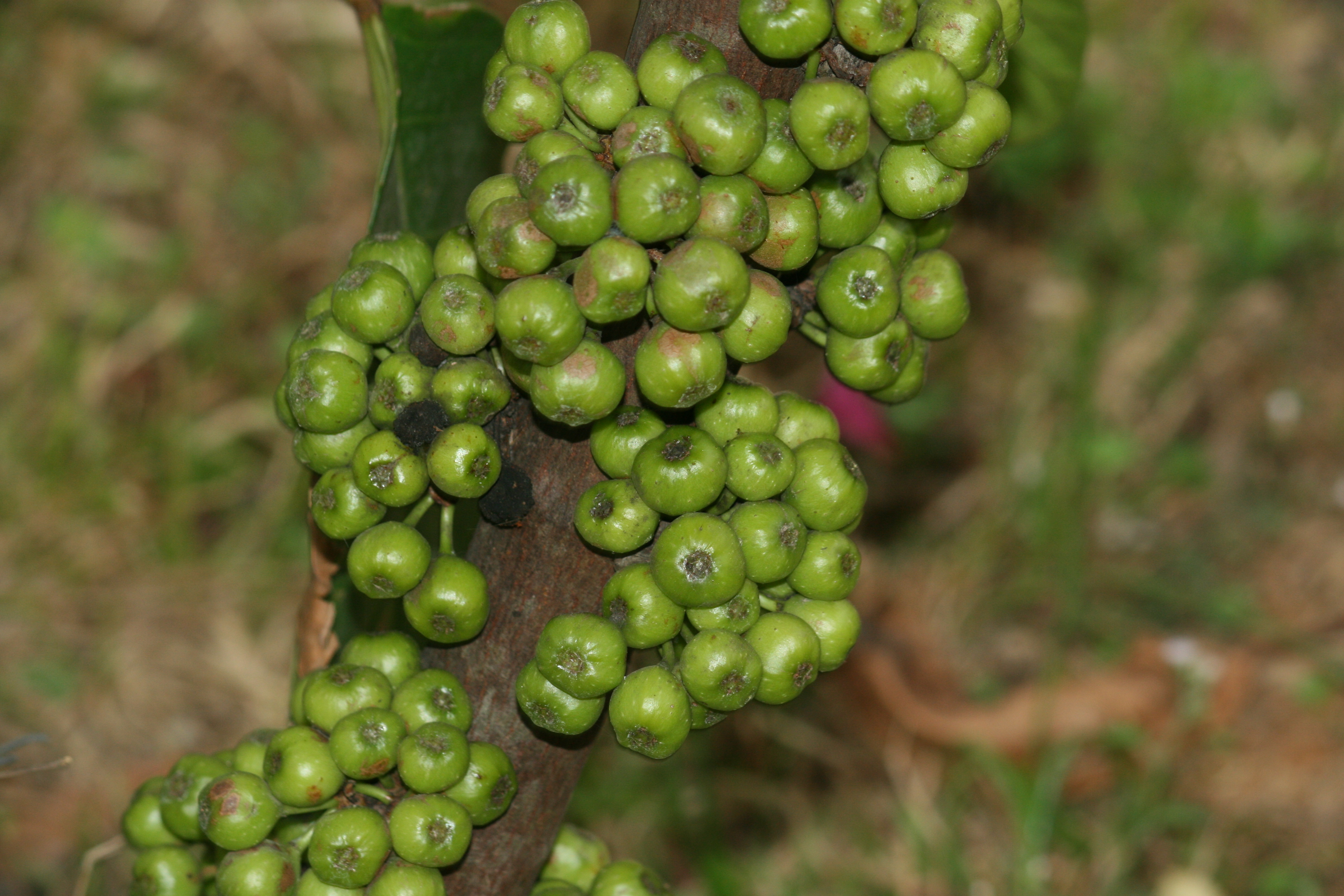

Conservation status
- Least Concern (IUCN 3.1)

Scientific classification
- Kingdom: Plantae
- Clade: Tracheophytes
- Clade: Angiosperms
- Clade: Eudicots
- Clade: Rosids
- Order: Rosales
- Family: Moraceae
- Tribe: Ficeae
- Genus: Ficus
- Subgenus: F. subg. Sycomorus
- Species: F. fistulosa

Binomial name
- Ficus fistulosa Reinw. ex Blume

Varieties
- Ficus fistulosa var. fistulosa; Ficus fistulosa var. tengerensis (Miq.) Kuntze

Synonyms
- Synonymy: synonyms of var. fistulosa: Ficus curranii Merr.; Ficus condensa King; Ficus fistulosa var. angustifolia Miq.; Ficus fistulosa var. lucbanensis (Elmer) Corner; Ficus fistulosa var. obliqua Miq.; Ficus grandidens Merr.; Ficus harlandii Benth.; Ficus lucbanensis Elmer; Ficus millingtonifolia Griff.; Ficus polysyce Ridl.; Ficus repandifolia Elmer; Ficus rubrovenia Merr. synonyms of var. tengerensis: Covellia subopposita Miq.; Covellia tuberculata Miq.; Ficus fistulosa var. cincta Hochr.; Ficus tengerensis Miq.; Ficus tuberculata (Miq.) Miq.

= Ficus fistulosa =

Species of fig tree

Ficus fistulosa is an Asian species of fig tree in the family Moraceae. It is native to South and Southeast Asia from Assam to Taiwan, including India, Bangladesh, Myanmar, Thailand, Laos, Cambodia, Vietnam, Peninsular Malaysia, southern China including Hong Kong and Hainan, and throughout Malesia and New Guinea. It is dioecious, with male and female flowers produced on separate individuals. In Vietnam, it is called sung giòn.

The species was described by Carl Ludwig Blume in 1825. No subspecies are listed in the Catalogue of Life.

== Description ==
Its fruits are greenish yellow when ripe.

== Ecology ==
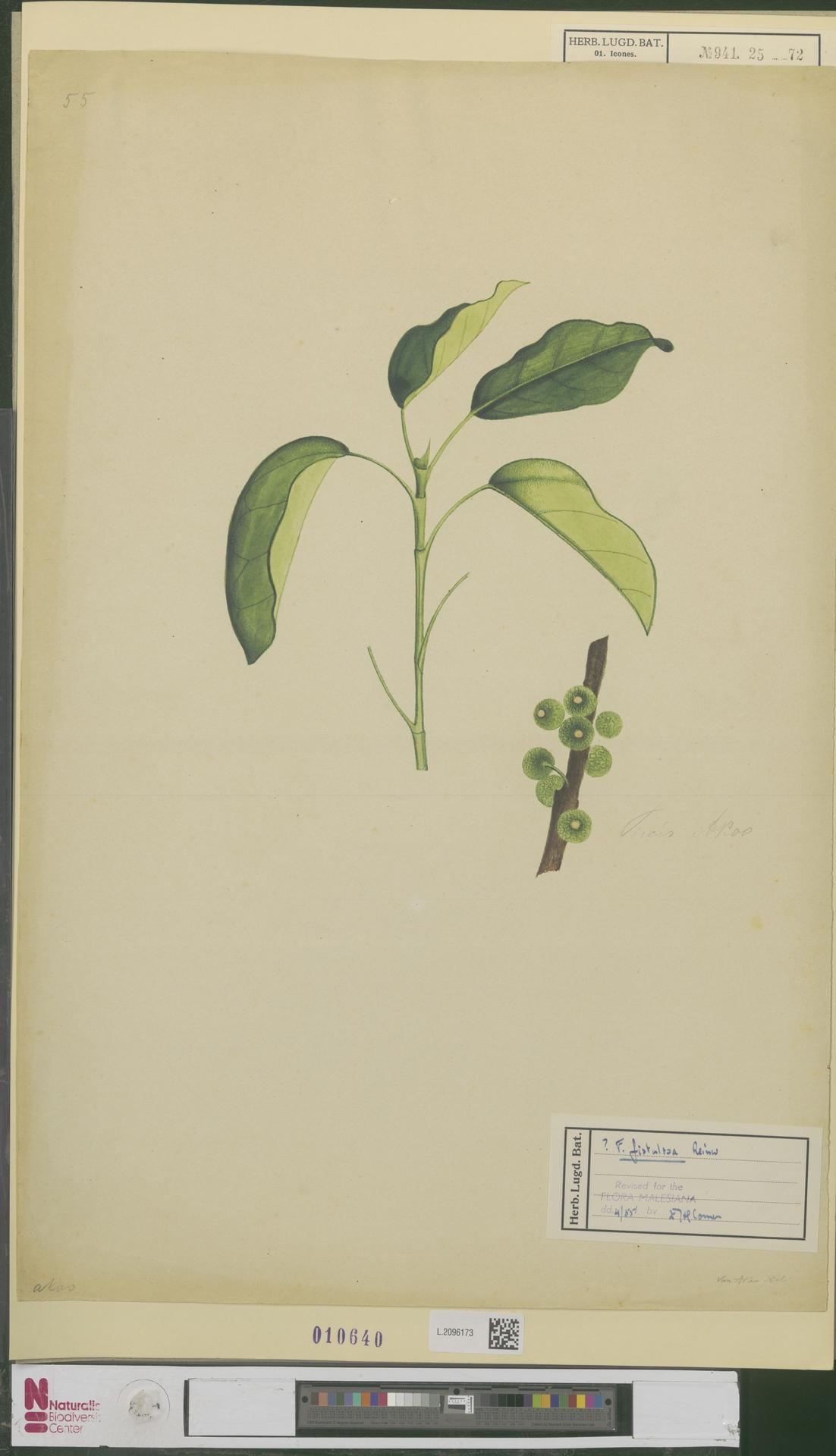
Leaves and fruits

A survey conducted in Hong Kong observed fruit bats feeding on the seed figs of F. fistulosa and two other species in the subgenus Sycomorus, namely F. hispida and F. variegata. Most of the bats were identified as Cynopterus sphinx, while the larger individuals were thought to be Rousettus leschenaultii, the only other fruit bat species in Hong Kong.
