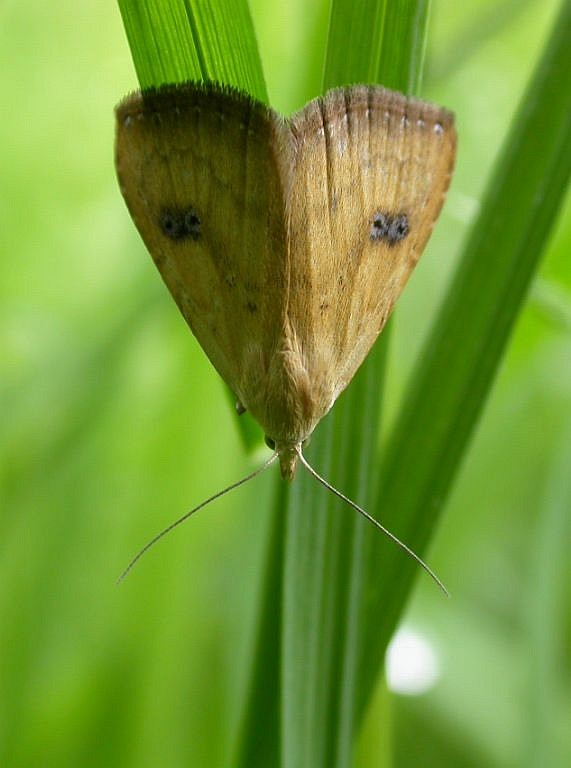

Scientific classification
- Kingdom: Animalia
- Phylum: Arthropoda
- Clade: Pancrustacea
- Class: Insecta
- Order: Lepidoptera
- Superfamily: Noctuoidea
- Family: Erebidae
- Subfamily: Rivulinae; Grote, 1895

= Rivulinae =

Subfamily of moths

The Rivulinae are a subfamily of moths in the family Erebidae described by Augustus Radcliffe Grote in 1895. Caterpillars in the subfamily typically have long, barbed hairs and have full prolegs on abdominal segments 3 through 6. The adults have a unique microsculpturing proboscis.

== Taxonomy ==
This subfamily was previously classified as part of the subfamily Hypeninae of Erebidae or within Noctuidae. Recent phylogenetic studies did not discover a close relationship with the Hypeninae but keep it within the Erebidae.

== Genera ==
- Alesua
- Bocula
- Janzena Troubridge, 2020
- Oxycilla
- Oglasa
- Rivula
- Zebeeba
- Zelicodes
