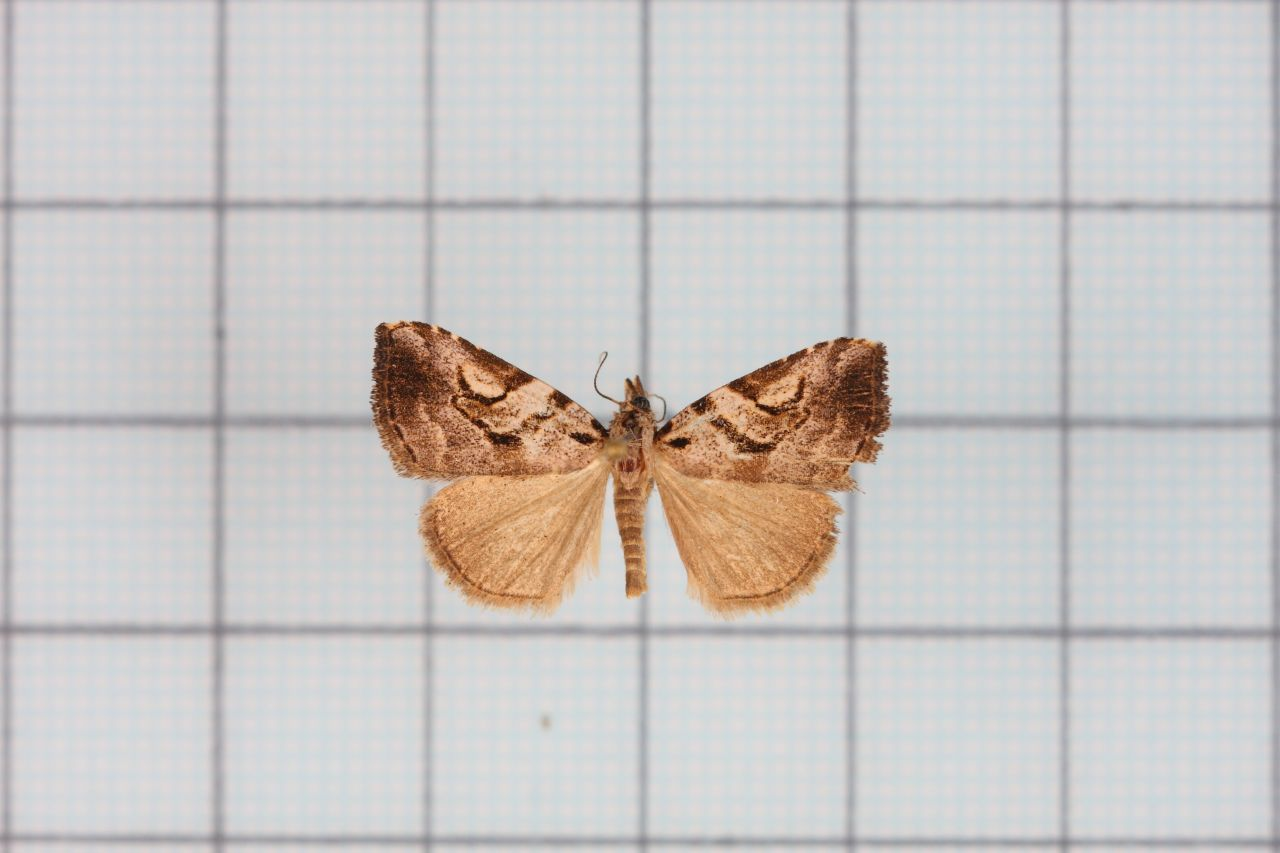
- Oglasa mediopallens

Scientific classification
- Kingdom: Animalia
- Phylum: Arthropoda
- Clade: Pancrustacea
- Class: Insecta
- Order: Lepidoptera
- Superfamily: Noctuoidea
- Family: Erebidae
- Subfamily: Rivulinae
- Genus: Oglasa; Walker, 1859

Synonyms
- Barbesola Walker, 1862; Chorisa Walker, 1863; Dorsippa Walker, 1863

= Oglasa =

Genus of moths

Oglasa is a genus of moths in the family Erebidae. The genus was first described by Francis Walker in 1859.

== Species ==
- Oglasa annulisigna Hampson, 1926 Ghana
- Oglasa ansorgei (Bethune-Baker, 1913) Angola
- Oglasa apicalis (Leech, 1900) China (Zhejiang)
- Oglasa arcuata (Fabricius, 1787) Sri Lanka
- Oglasa aroa (Bethune-Baker, 1908) New Guinea
- Oglasa atristipata Hampson, 1926 Ghana
- Oglasa aulota Hampson, 1926 southern Nigeria
- Oglasa auximena Viette, 1958 Madagascar
- Oglasa basicomma Holloway Borneo
- Oglasa bifidalis (Leech, 1889) Japan
- Oglasa bisignata (Hampson, 1907) Sri Lanka
- Oglasa calimanii Berio, 1939 Ethiopia
- Oglasa chavanei Viette, 1965 Madagascar
- Oglasa confluens Hampson, 1926 Transvaal
- Oglasa connectens Hampson, 1926 Philippines (Luzon)
- Oglasa contigua Wileman & West, 1929 Philippines (Luzon)
- Oglasa costimacula Wileman, 1915 Taiwan
- Oglasa costisignata Hamspon, 1926 Borneo
- Oglasa defixa (Walker, 1862) Borneo
- Oglasa dia (Viette, 1972) Madagascar
- Oglasa diagonalis Hampson, 1926 Ghana
- Oglasa diasticta Hampson, 1926 Borneo
- Oglasa fulviceps (Hampson, 1894) Himachal Pradesh
- Oglasa fuscitemrinata (Hampson, 1898) Sikkim
- Oglasa griselda Hampson, 1926 Ghana
- Oglasa hollandi Gaede, 1930 Sierra Leone
- Oglasa holophaea (Hampson, 1926) southern Nigeria
- Oglasa hypenoides (Moore, 1881) Meghalaya
- Oglasa iselaea Viette, 1958 Madagascar
- Oglasa junctisigna Hampson, 1926 New Guinea
- Oglasa lagusalis Walker, [1859] Borneo
- Oglasa maculosa (Walker, [1863]) Borneo
- Oglasa mediopalens Wileman & South, 1917 Taiwan
- Oglasa mediopallens Wileman & South, 1917
- Oglasa microsema Hampson, 1926 Ghana
- Oglasa muluensis Holloway Sarawak
- Oglasa nana (Walker, 1869) Congo
- Oglasa obliquilinea Hampson, 1926 New Guinea
- Oglasa obliquisigna Hampson, 1926 Myanmar
- Oglasa ochreobrunneata Viette, 1956 Madagascar
- Oglasa ochreovenata (Bethune-Baker, 1906) New Guinea
- Oglasa pachycnemis Hampson, 1926 Borneo
- Oglasa parallela Hampson, 1926 Malawi
- Oglasa phaeonephele Hampson, 1926 southern Nigeria
- Oglasa plagiata Gaede, 1939 Cameroon
- Oglasa prionosticha Turner, 1944 north-western Australia
- Oglasa renilinea Gaede, 1949 East Africa
- Oglasa retracta (Hampson, 1907) Sri Lanka
- Oglasa rufimedia Hampson, 1926 Nigeria
- Oglasa rufoaurantia Rothschild, 1915 Ceram
- Oglasa separata (Walker, 1865) Northern India
- Oglasa sordida (Wileman, 1915) Taiwan
- Oglasa sordidula (Walker, 1864) Borneo, Singapore, Sumatra
- Oglasa stygiana Galsworthy, 1997 China
- Oglasa tamsi Gaede, 1939 Ghana, Cameroon
- Oglasa tessellata Hampson, 1926 southern Nigeria
- Oglasa trigona (Hampson, 1891) Nilgiri
- Oglasa umbrosa (Wileman, 1916) Taiwan
- Oglasa xanthorhabda Prout, 1926 Buru
