= Plotheia decrescens =

Scientific classification
- Kingdom: Animalia
- Phylum: Arthropoda
- Class: Insecta
- Order: Lepidoptera
- Superfamily: Noctuoidea
- Family: Erebidae
- Genus: Rivula
- Species: R. decrescens

Binomial name
- Rivula decrescens (Walker, 1857)

Synonyms
- Gadirtha decrescens Walker, [1858]; Plotheia frontalis Walker, [1858]; Egelesta rudivitta Walker, 1858; Galleriomorpha lichenoides Nietner, 1861; Othora albivitta Walker, 1865; Othroa albotecta Walker, 1865; Othora basifascia Walker, 1865; Othora canescens Walker, 1865; Othora cinerascens Walker, 1865; Othora concisa Walker, 1865; Gadirtha guttulosa Walker, 1865; Othora imprimens Walker, 1865; Othora lata Walker, 1865; Othora onusta Walker, 1865; Othora plagiata Walker, 1865; Othora singata Walker, 1865; Gadirtha spurcata Walker, 1865; Othora subglauca Walker, 1865; Othora velata Walker, 1865; Plotheia griseovirens Moore, [1885]; Plotheia lativitta Moore, [1885]

Species of moth

Plotheia decrescens is a moth of the family Nolidae first described by Francis Walker in 1857. It is found in Sri Lanka.
