= R. concinna =

R. concinna may refer to:

- Raphitoma concinna, a sea snail
- Reteporella concinna, a lace coral
- Rivula concinna, an Australian moth
