= Oglasa defixa =

Scientific classification
- Kingdom: Animalia
- Phylum: Arthropoda
- Class: Insecta
- Order: Lepidoptera
- Superfamily: Noctuoidea
- Family: Erebidae
- Genus: Oglasa
- Species: O. defixa

Binomial name
- Oglasa defixa (Walker, 1862)

Synonyms
- Barbesola defixa Walker, 1862

Species of moth

Oglasa defixa is a species of moth in the family Erebidae first described by Francis Walker in 1862. It is found in Borneo and Thailand. Adults are brown, and are commonly found at elevations between 100 and 1000 m above sea level.
