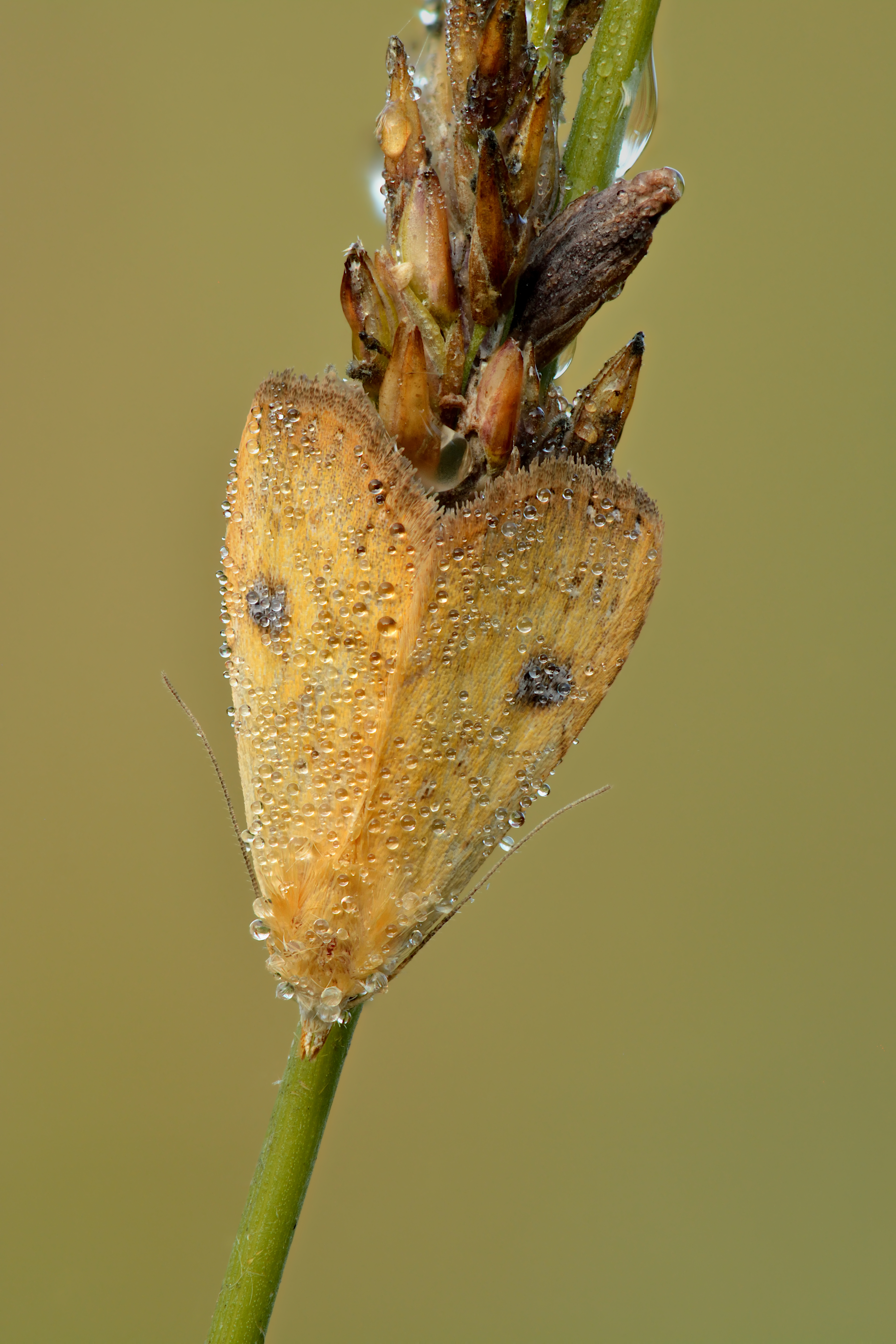

Scientific classification
- Kingdom: Animalia
- Phylum: Arthropoda
- Clade: Pancrustacea
- Class: Insecta
- Order: Lepidoptera
- Superfamily: Noctuoidea
- Family: Erebidae
- Genus: Rivula
- Species: R. sericealis

Binomial name
- Rivula sericealis (Scopoli, 1763)

= Rivula sericealis =

Straw dot

Species of moth

Rivula sericealis, the straw dot, is a moth of the family Erebidae. The species was first described by Giovanni Antonio Scopoli in his 1763 Entomologia Carniolica. It is found in Europe including the Iberian Peninsula and southern Fennoscandia and south to North Africa. In an easterly direction, the species occurs across the Palearctic to the Pacific Ocean and Japan. The species closely resembles Evergestis forficalis.

== Technical description and variation ==
The wingspan is 18–22 mm. The length of the forewings is 13–15 mm. Forewing triangular, the apex rectangular, the termen curved; veins 7, 8, 9 stalked. Forewing straw yellow, becoming deeper terminally; with a black-brown reniform stigma containing two black dots; inner and outer lines brownish, obscure, the outer sinuous, excurved round the cell; hindwing luteous (mud coloured) with a yellow tinge, darker terminally.

== Biology ==
The moth flies from May to October depending on the location.

Larva green; dorsal line darker; subdorsal white; head greenish ochreous. The larvae feed on various grasses, such as false brome and purple moor grass.

Habitats include moist grasslands, wasteland, sparse forests, alder forests and parklands.

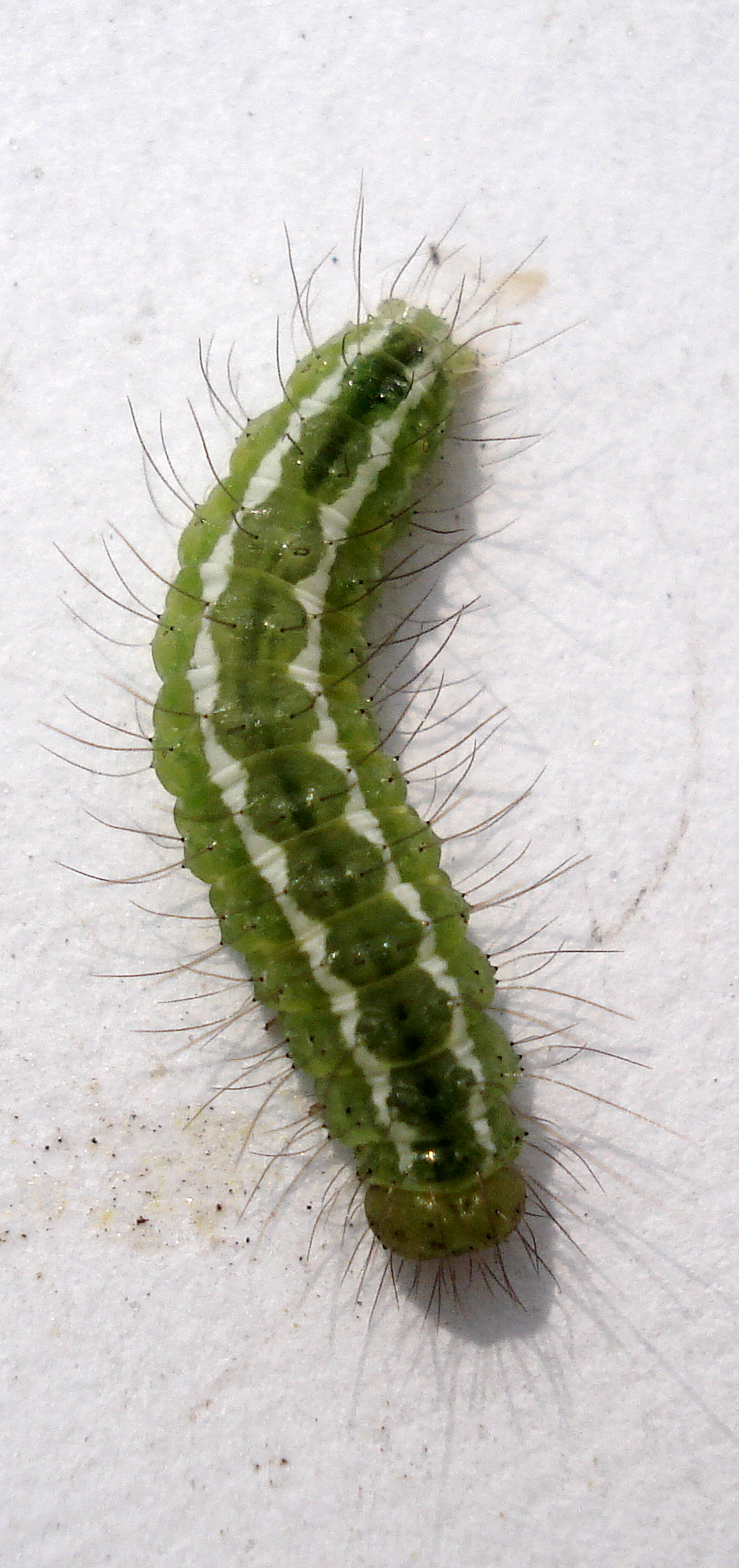
Larva

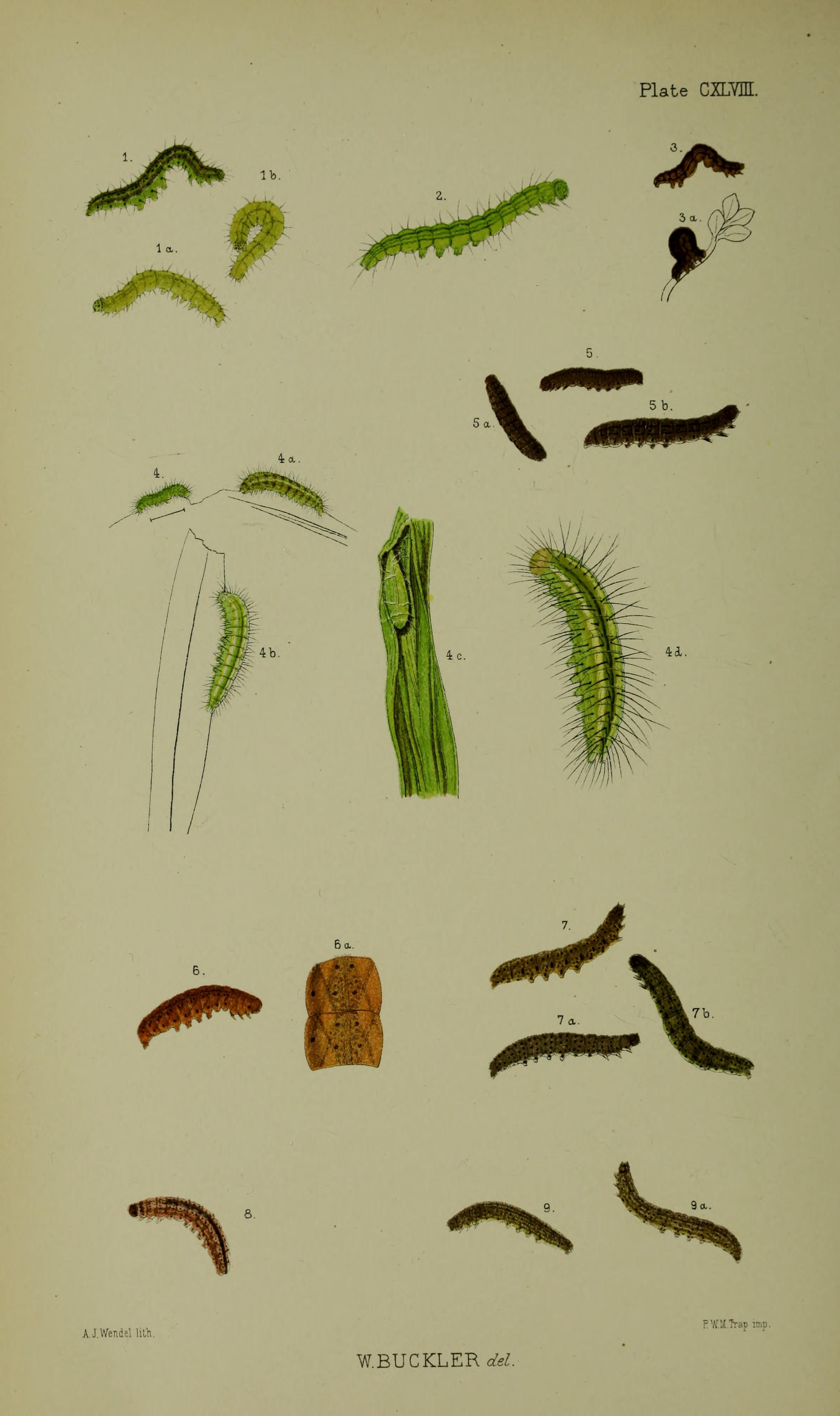
Illustration Figs. 4, 4a, 4b the same larva in various stages of growth 4c pupa 4d much magnified figure of 4

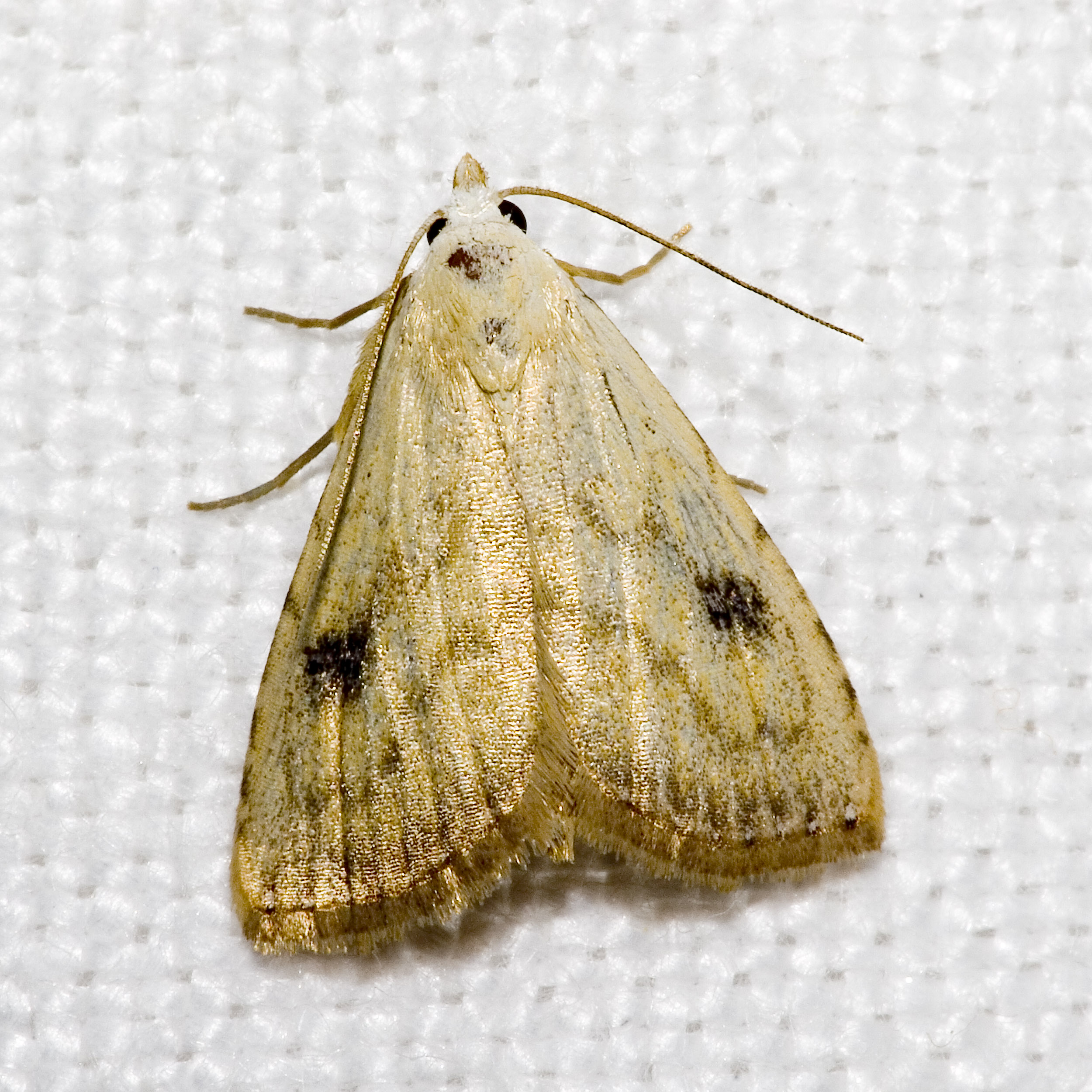

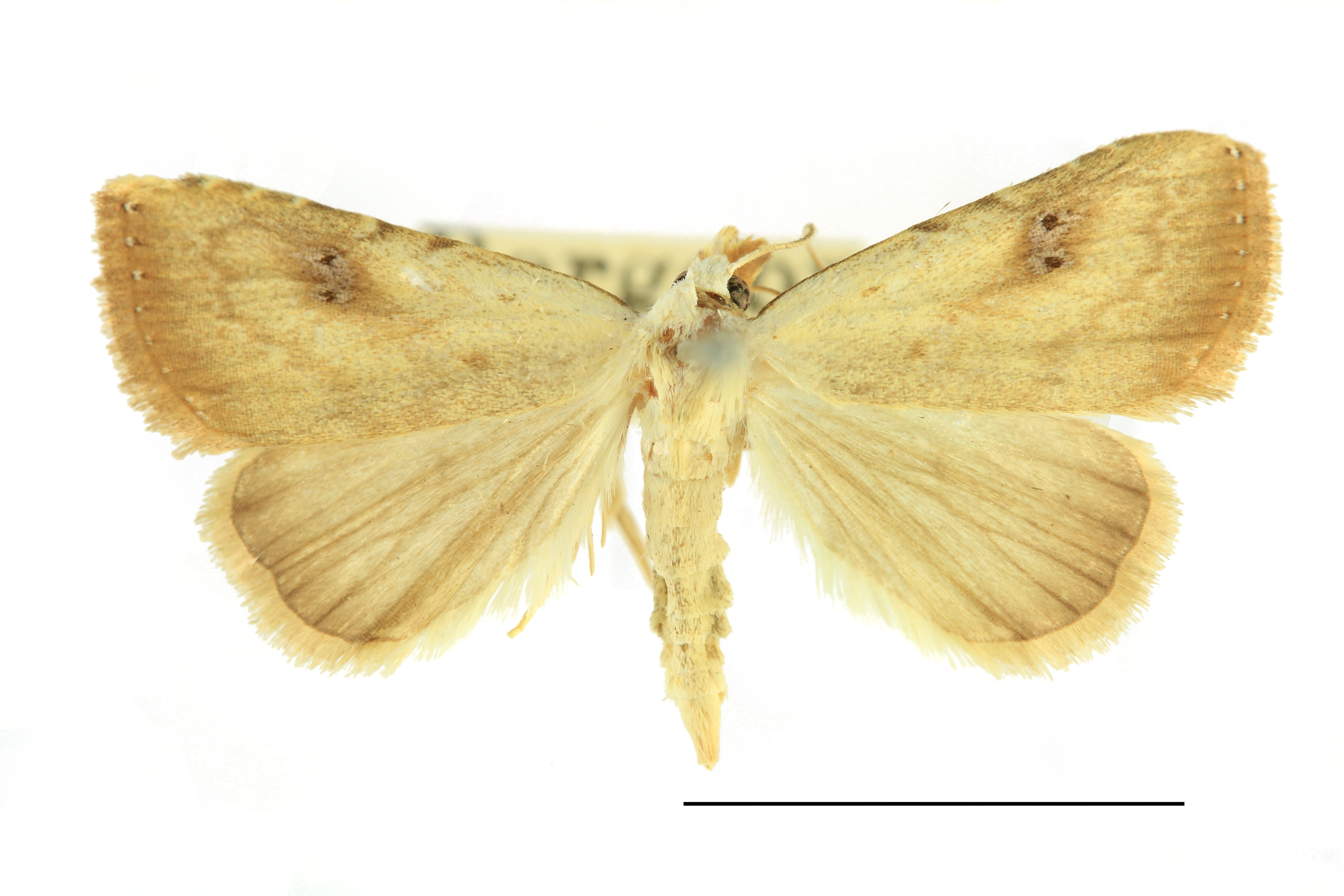
Museum specimen
