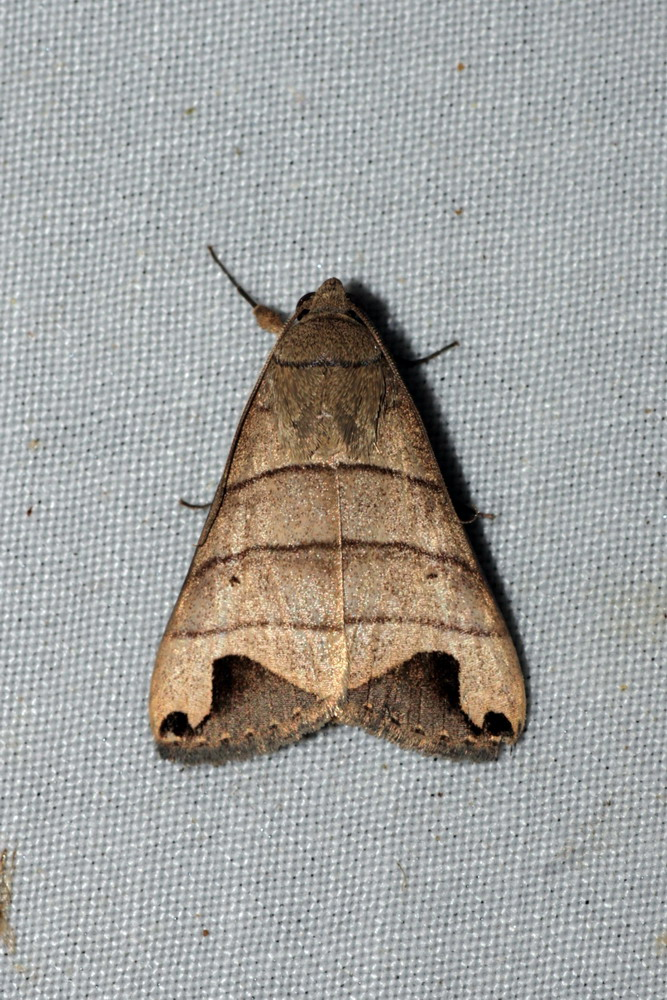

Scientific classification
- Kingdom: Animalia
- Phylum: Arthropoda
- Clade: Pancrustacea
- Class: Insecta
- Order: Lepidoptera
- Superfamily: Noctuoidea
- Family: Erebidae
- Genus: Bocula
- Species: B. bifaria

Binomial name
- Bocula bifaria (Walker, [1863])

Synonyms
- Lacibisa bifaria; Bematha transversata Wileman & West, 1929; Bocula microscala

= Bocula bifaria =

Species of moth

Bocula bifaria is a moth of the family Erebidae first described by Francis Walker in 1863. It is found in the Philippines, Peninsular Malaysia, Sumatra and Borneo.
