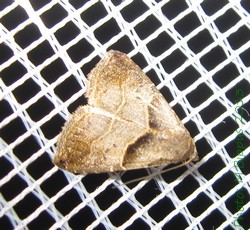

Scientific classification
- Kingdom: Animalia
- Phylum: Arthropoda
- Clade: Pancrustacea
- Class: Insecta
- Order: Lepidoptera
- Superfamily: Noctuoidea
- Family: Erebidae
- Genus: Rivula
- Species: R. dimorpha

Binomial name
- Rivula dimorpha Fryer, 1912

= Rivula dimorpha =

Species of moth

Rivula dimorpha is a species of moth in the family Erebidae. It was described by John Fryer in 1912. This species can be found in the Seychelles, La Réunion, Madagascar, and is widespread in continental Africa from Nigeria to South Africa.

It has a wingspan of 18mm.
