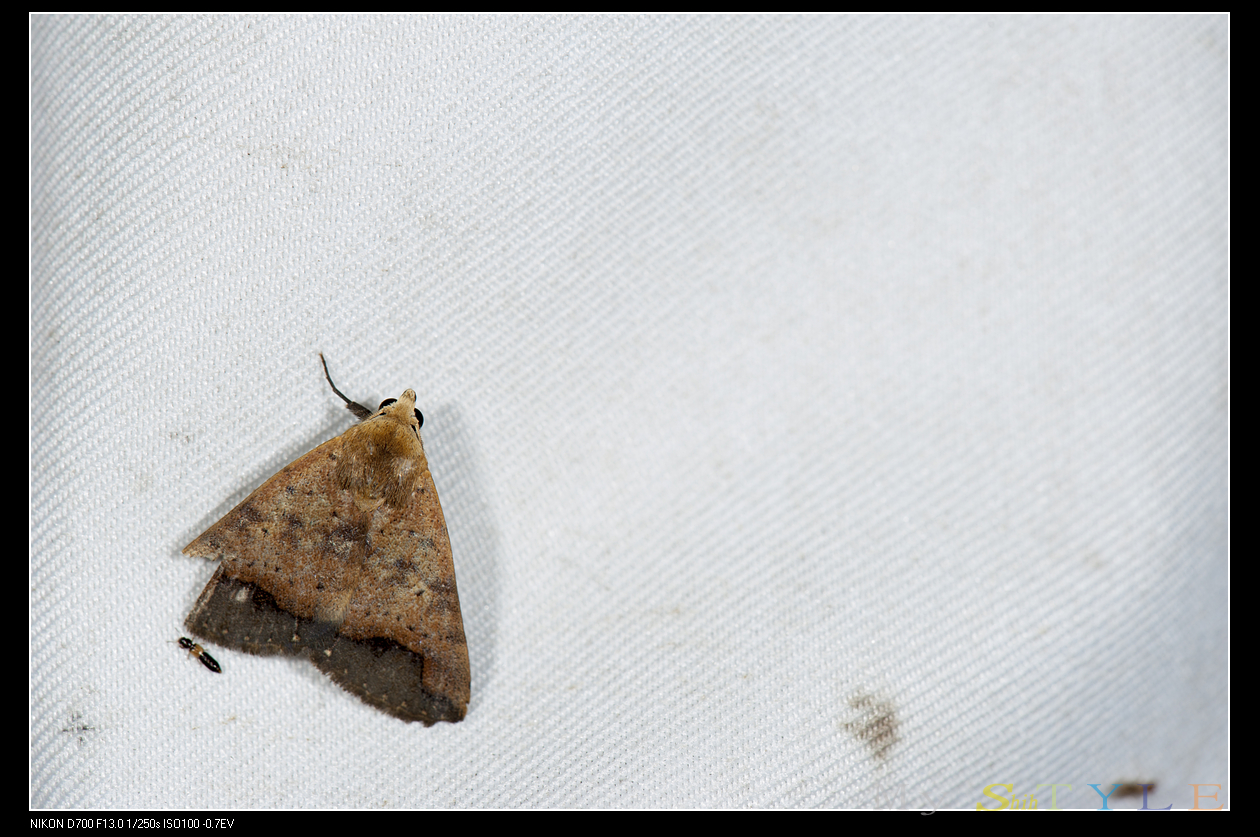

Scientific classification
- Kingdom: Animalia
- Phylum: Arthropoda
- Clade: Pancrustacea
- Class: Insecta
- Order: Lepidoptera
- Superfamily: Noctuoidea
- Family: Erebidae
- Genus: Bocula
- Species: B. xanthostola

Binomial name
- Bocula xanthostola Hampson, 1926

Synonyms
- Aramuna marginata Moore, 1884; Bocula xanthostola; Leucania bifascia

= Bocula xanthostola =

Species of moth

Bocula xanthostola is a moth of the family Erebidae first described by George Hampson in 1926. It is found in Sri Lanka, Peninsular Malaysia, Sumatra and Borneo.

== Description ==
Its wingspan is about 31 mm. The body is whitish with a slight pink tinge. Thorax blackish brown. Forewings with a black-brown fascia from base, becoming very broad in and beyond the end of cell. A white speck is found at the lower angle of the cell. Postmedial and marginal series of specks can be seen. Veins are rather pale in color. Hindwings are pinkish fuscous.
