= Rivula erebina =

Scientific classification
- Kingdom: Animalia
- Phylum: Arthropoda
- Clade: Pancrustacea
- Class: Insecta
- Order: Lepidoptera
- Superfamily: Noctuoidea
- Family: Erebidae
- Genus: Rivula
- Species: R. erebina

Binomial name
- Rivula erebina Hampson, 1926

Species of moth

Rivula erebina is a species of moth in the family Erebidae. It was described by George Hampson in 1926. This species can be found in West Africa.
