= Alesua =

Scientific classification
- Kingdom: Animalia
- Phylum: Arthropoda
- Clade: Pancrustacea
- Class: Insecta
- Order: Lepidoptera
- Superfamily: Noctuoidea
- Family: Erebidae
- Subfamily: Rivulinae
- Genus: Alesua; Dyar, 1918
- Species: A. etialis

Binomial name
- Alesua etialis Dyar, 1918

Genus of moths

Alesua is a monotypic moth genus in the family Erebidae. Its only species, Alesua etialis, is known from Mexico. Both the genus and species were first described by Harrison Gray Dyar Jr. in 1918.
