= Zebeeba =

Scientific classification
- Kingdom: Animalia
- Phylum: Arthropoda
- Clade: Pancrustacea
- Class: Insecta
- Order: Lepidoptera
- Superfamily: Noctuoidea
- Family: Erebidae
- Subfamily: Rivulinae
- Genus: Zebeeba; Kirby, 1892
- Species: Z. falsalis

Binomial name
- Zebeeba falsalis (Herrich-Schäffer, [1839])

Synonyms
- Generic: Nycteola Herrich-Schäffer, [1851]; Specific: Hypena falsalis Herrich-Schäffer, [1839]; Nola dardoinula Millière, 1871

Genus of moths

Zebeeba is a monotypic genus of moths in the family Erebidae erected by William Forsell Kirby in 1892. Its only species, Zebeeba falsalis, was first described by Gottlieb August Wilhelm Herrich-Schäffer in 1839. It is found in northern Africa, southern Europe, Asia Minor and the Levant.
