= Zelicodes =

Scientific classification
- Kingdom: Animalia
- Phylum: Arthropoda
- Class: Insecta
- Order: Lepidoptera
- Superfamily: Noctuoidea
- Family: Erebidae
- Subfamily: Rivulinae
- Genus: Zelicodes; Grote, 1896
- Species: Z. linearis

Binomial name
- Zelicodes linearis (Grote, 1883)

Synonyms
- Litognatha linearis Grote, 1883

Genus of moths

Zelicodes is a monotypic moth genus in the family Erebidae. Its only species, Zelicodes linearis, is known from the US state of Arizona. Both the genus and species were first described by Augustus Radcliffe Grote, the genus in 1896 and the species in 1883.
