= Bocula odontosema =

Scientific classification
- Kingdom: Animalia
- Phylum: Arthropoda
- Clade: Pancrustacea
- Class: Insecta
- Order: Lepidoptera
- Superfamily: Noctuoidea
- Family: Erebidae
- Genus: Bocula
- Species: B. odontosema

Binomial name
- Bocula odontosema Turner, 1909

Synonyms
- Bocula lophoproctis; Trapezoptera lobata

Species of moth

Bocula odontosema is a moth of the family Erebidae first described by Alfred Jefferis Turner in 1909. It is found in the Australian state of Queensland and in New Guinea.
