= Bocula undilineata =

Scientific classification
- Kingdom: Animalia
- Phylum: Arthropoda
- Clade: Pancrustacea
- Class: Insecta
- Order: Lepidoptera
- Superfamily: Noctuoidea
- Family: Erebidae
- Genus: Bocula
- Species: B. undilineata

Binomial name
- Bocula undilineata Warren, 1912

Species of moth

Bocula undilineata is a moth of the family Erebidae first described by Warren in 1912. It is found in the Himalayas.
