= Bocula calthula =

Scientific classification
- Kingdom: Animalia
- Phylum: Arthropoda
- Clade: Pancrustacea
- Class: Insecta
- Order: Lepidoptera
- Superfamily: Noctuoidea
- Family: Erebidae
- Genus: Bocula
- Species: B. calthula

Binomial name
- Bocula calthula Swinhoe, 1906

Synonyms
- Borsippa calthula

Species of moth

Bocula calthula is a moth of the family Erebidae first described by Charles Swinhoe in 1906. It is found in Borneo and the Philippines.
