= Bocula inconclusa =

Scientific classification
- Kingdom: Animalia
- Phylum: Arthropoda
- Clade: Pancrustacea
- Class: Insecta
- Order: Lepidoptera
- Superfamily: Noctuoidea
- Family: Erebidae
- Genus: Bocula
- Species: B. inconclusa

Binomial name
- Bocula inconclusa Walker, 1862

Synonyms
- Agrotis inconclusa; Aramuna lutosa

Species of moth

Bocula inconclusa is a moth of the family Erebidae first described by Francis Walker in 1862. It is found in Borneo and Myanmar.
