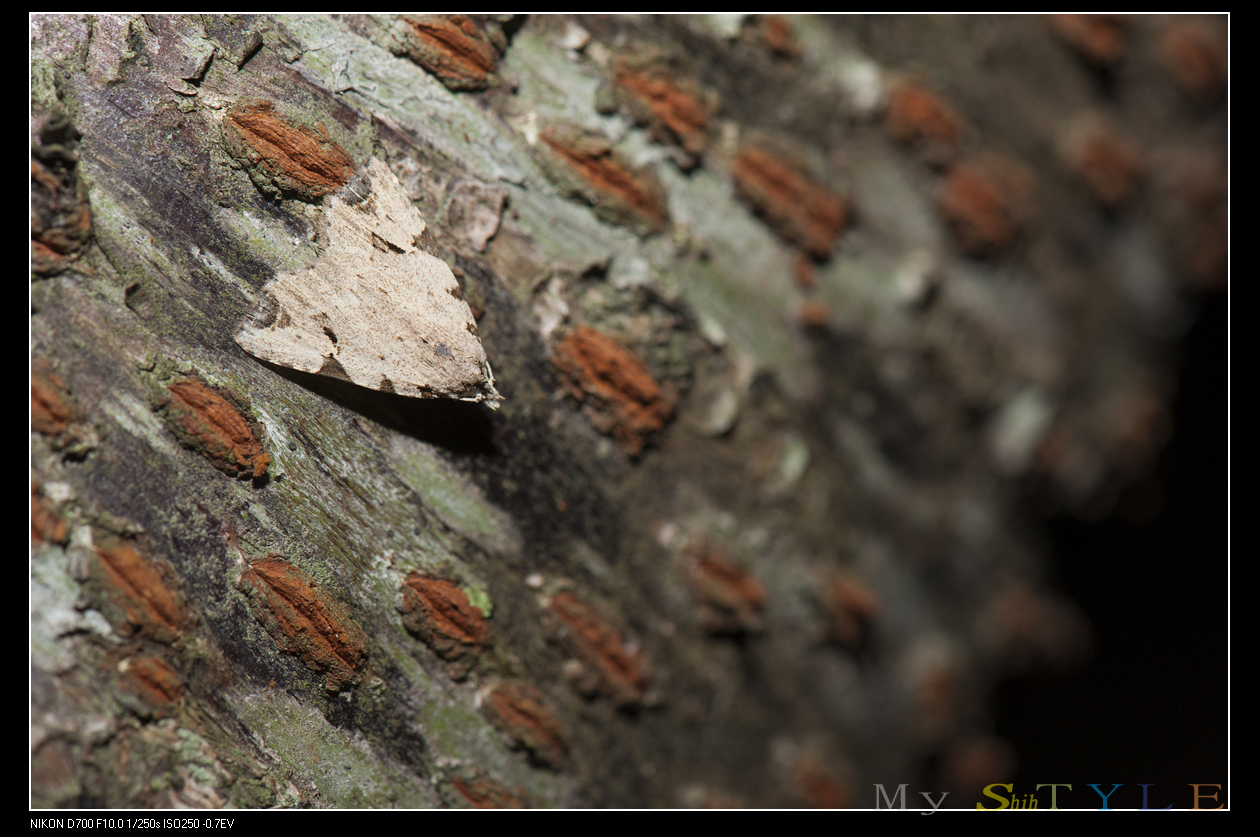

Scientific classification
- Domain: Eukaryota
- Kingdom: Animalia
- Phylum: Arthropoda
- Class: Insecta
- Order: Lepidoptera
- Superfamily: Noctuoidea
- Family: Erebidae
- Genus: Oglasa
- Species: O. costimacula

Binomial name
- Oglasa costimacula Wileman, 1915

= Oglasa costimacula =

Species of moth

Oglasa costimacula is a moth of the family Noctuidae. It is found in Taiwan and on Borneo. The habitat consists of alluvial forests.

The anterior arc of the forewing submarginal area encloses a dark brown area at the margin.
