= Bocula samarinda =

Scientific classification
- Kingdom: Animalia
- Phylum: Arthropoda
- Clade: Pancrustacea
- Class: Insecta
- Order: Lepidoptera
- Superfamily: Noctuoidea
- Family: Erebidae
- Genus: Bocula
- Species: B. samarinda

Binomial name
- Bocula samarinda Holloway, 2005

Species of moth

Bocula samarinda is a nocturnal moth of the family Erebidae first described by Jeremy Daniel Holloway in 2005. It is found in Borneo.

The wingspan is about 20 mm.

A Bocula Samarinda on a wall. note large black eyes and triangle wings.
