= Bocula quadrilineata =

Scientific classification
- Kingdom: Animalia
- Phylum: Arthropoda
- Clade: Pancrustacea
- Class: Insecta
- Order: Lepidoptera
- Superfamily: Noctuoidea
- Family: Erebidae
- Genus: Bocula
- Species: B. quadrilineata

Binomial name
- Bocula quadrilineata Walker, 1858

Synonyms
- Borsippa quadrilineata

Species of moth

Bocula quadrilineata is a moth of the family Erebidae first described by Francis Walker in 1858. It is found in Borneo.
