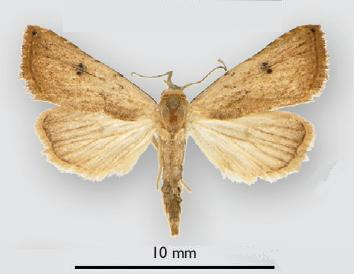

Scientific classification
- Domain: Eukaryota
- Kingdom: Animalia
- Phylum: Arthropoda
- Class: Insecta
- Order: Lepidoptera
- Superfamily: Noctuoidea
- Family: Erebidae
- Genus: Rivula
- Species: R. pusilla

Binomial name
- Rivula pusilla Möschler, 1890

Synonyms
- Rivula nigripuncta

= Rivula pusilla =

Species of moth

Rivula pusilla is a species of moth of the family Noctuidae first described by Heinrich Benno Möschler in 1890. It is found in Florida and Texas in the United States. It is also found in Guadeloupe, Marie-Galante, Saint Kitts, Greater Antilles, Costa-Rica and French Guiana.

The wingspan is about 14 mm.
