= Rivula everta =

Scientific classification
- Domain: Eukaryota
- Kingdom: Animalia
- Phylum: Arthropoda
- Class: Insecta
- Order: Lepidoptera
- Superfamily: Noctuoidea
- Family: Erebidae
- Genus: Rivula
- Species: R. everta

Binomial name
- Rivula everta C. Swinhoe, 1901

Synonyms
- Paurosceles geminipuncta Turner, 1945

Species of moth

Rivula everta is a moth of the family Erebidae first described by Charles Swinhoe in 1901. It is found in Australia in Queensland and the Northern Territory.
