= Bocula anticlina =

Scientific classification
- Kingdom: Animalia
- Phylum: Arthropoda
- Clade: Pancrustacea
- Class: Insecta
- Order: Lepidoptera
- Superfamily: Noctuoidea
- Family: Erebidae
- Genus: Bocula
- Species: B. anticlina

Binomial name
- Bocula anticlina Holloway, 2005

Species of moth

Bocula anticlina is a moth of the family Erebidae. It is found in Borneo.

The wingspan is about 15 mm for females and 17 mm for males.
