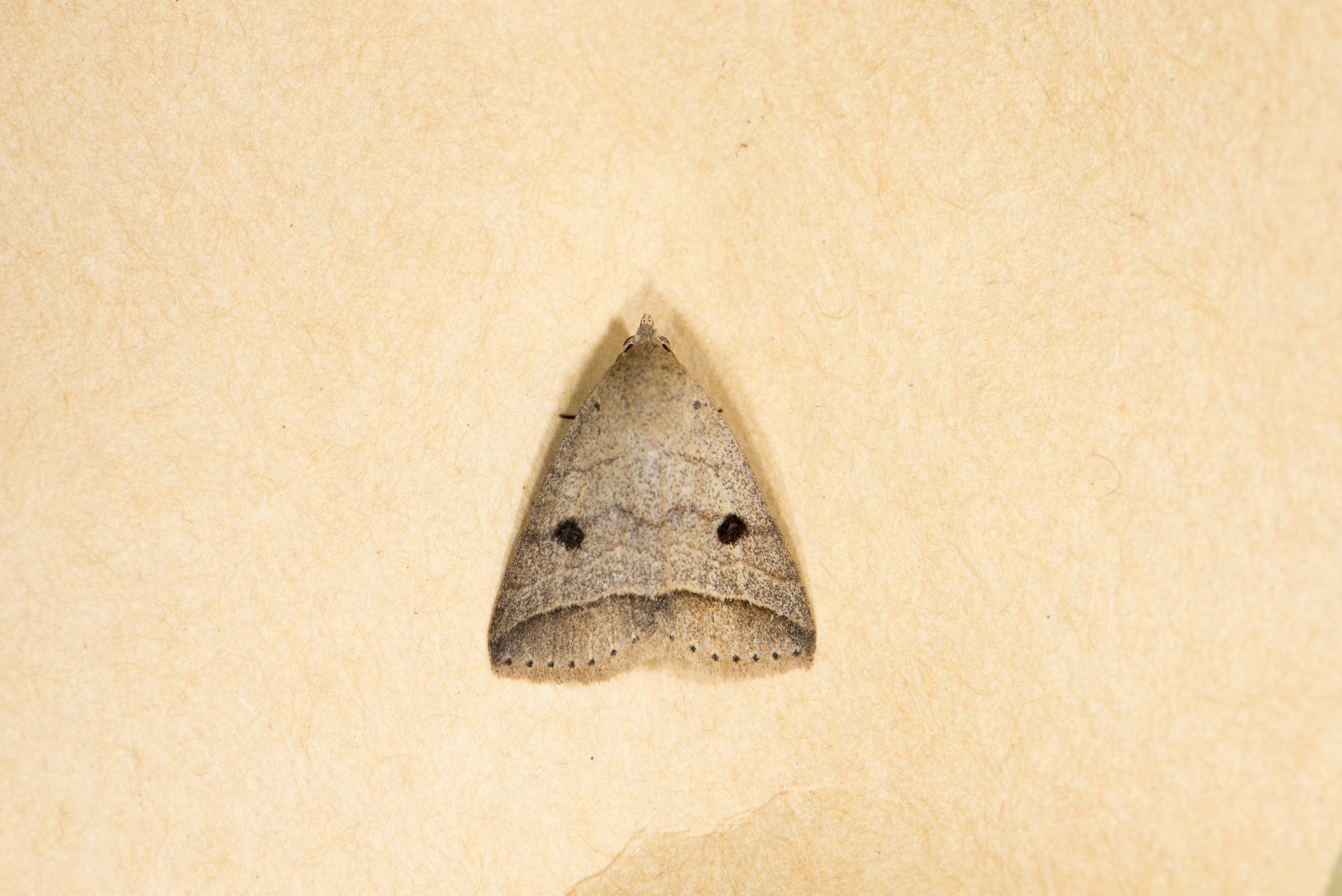

Scientific classification
- Kingdom: Animalia
- Phylum: Arthropoda
- Clade: Pancrustacea
- Class: Insecta
- Order: Lepidoptera
- Superfamily: Noctuoidea
- Family: Erebidae
- Genus: Bocula
- Species: B. caradrinoides

Binomial name
- Bocula caradrinoides Guenée, 1852

= Bocula caradrinoides =

Species of moth

Bocula caradrinoides is a moth of the family Erebidae first described by Achille Guenée in 1852. It is found in Java, Borneo, Hong Kong and Japan.

The wingspan is about 24 mm.
