= Bocula wuyiensis =

Scientific classification
- Kingdom: Animalia
- Phylum: Arthropoda
- Clade: Pancrustacea
- Class: Insecta
- Order: Lepidoptera
- Superfamily: Noctuoidea
- Family: Erebidae
- Genus: Bocula
- Species: B. wuyiensis

Binomial name
- Bocula wuyiensis J.-B. Sun, H.-Q. Hu & H.-L. Han, 2008

Species of moth

Bocula wuyiensis is a moth of the family Erebidae first described by Jia-Bao Sun, Hai-Qing Hu and Hui-Lin Han in 2008. It is found in China.
