= Bocula sejuncta =

Scientific classification
- Kingdom: Animalia
- Phylum: Arthropoda
- Clade: Pancrustacea
- Class: Insecta
- Order: Lepidoptera
- Superfamily: Noctuoidea
- Family: Erebidae
- Genus: Bocula
- Species: B. sejuncta

Binomial name
- Bocula sejuncta Walker, 1856

Synonyms
- Leucania sejuncta; Caradrina paucifera; Tricoptya expansilis; Tricoptya inquinata; Trichoptya subspurcata; Trichoptya nigropunctata; Trichoptya magna; Trichoptya pallida; Bocula celebensis

Species of moth

Bocula sejuncta is a moth of the family Erebidae first described by Francis Walker in 1856. It is found in the Indian subregion, Borneo, Sumbawa, Sulawesi, New Guinea and Queensland.

The larvae feed on Pongamia species. It lives on the underside of the leaves, skeletonising them from the edges.
