= Rivula aenictopis =

Scientific classification
- Domain: Eukaryota
- Kingdom: Animalia
- Phylum: Arthropoda
- Class: Insecta
- Order: Lepidoptera
- Superfamily: Noctuoidea
- Family: Erebidae
- Genus: Rivula
- Species: R. aenictopis

Binomial name
- Rivula aenictopis Turner, 1908

Species of moth

Rivula aenictopis is a moth of the family Erebidae first described by Alfred Jefferis Turner in 1908. It is found in northern Queensland, Australia.
