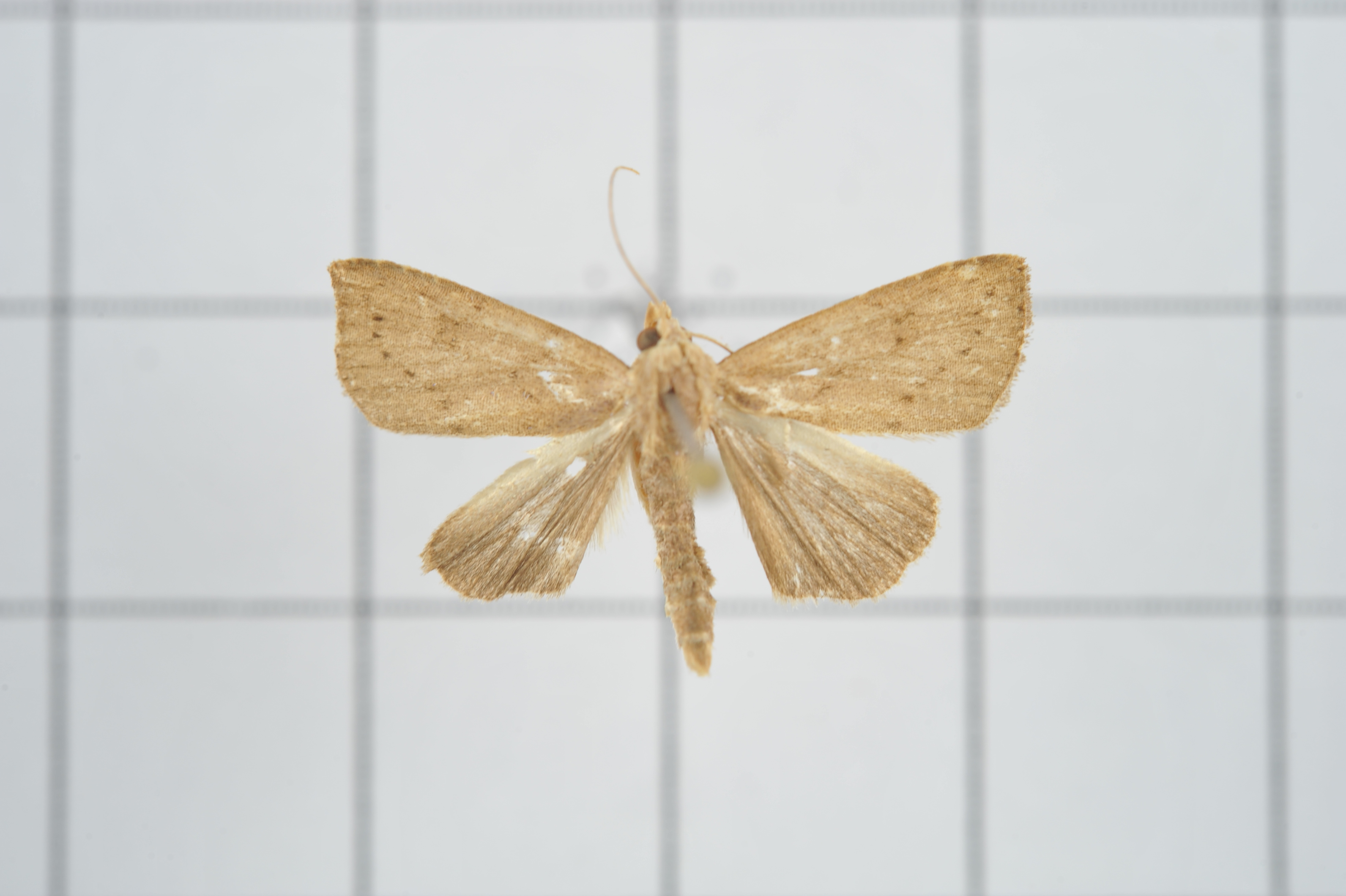

Scientific classification
- Kingdom: Animalia
- Phylum: Arthropoda
- Clade: Pancrustacea
- Class: Insecta
- Order: Lepidoptera
- Superfamily: Noctuoidea
- Family: Erebidae
- Genus: Rivula
- Species: R. aequalis

Binomial name
- Rivula aequalis Walker, 1863

Synonyms
- Motina aequalis Walker, 1863; Cholimma leucanioides Walker, [1863] 1864; Cholimma subpunctata Walker, [1863] 1864; Scopula nexalis Walker, 1865; Rivula biatomea Moore, 1883; Pasira biatomea Moore, 1883

= Rivula aequalis =

Species of moth

Rivula aequalis is a moth of the family Erebidae first described by Francis Walker in 1863. It is found in Sri Lanka, the Indian subregion, Japan, Sundaland, the Philippines and Sulawesi.

Its wings are a pale straw colour and narrower than other relative species. A transverse, bipunctate blackish discal mark is present. There is an oblique, centrally zigzag, submarginal row of diffuse, dark patches. In the female, the hindwings are slightly darker yellower than that of male. But the male has dark greyish scaling with a dark discal spot. Larval host plants are Bambusa species.
