= Rivula niphodesma =

Scientific classification
- Kingdom: Animalia
- Phylum: Arthropoda
- Clade: Pancrustacea
- Class: Insecta
- Order: Lepidoptera
- Superfamily: Noctuoidea
- Family: Erebidae
- Genus: Rivula
- Species: R. niphodesma

Binomial name
- Rivula niphodesma Meyrick, 1891

Synonyms
- Rivula proleuca Holland, 1900

Species of moth

Rivula niphodesma is a moth of the family Erebidae first described by Edward Meyrick in 1891. It is found in the Australian state of Queensland, the Northern Territory, and the Indonesian island of Buru.

== Sources ==
- "Species Rivula niphodesma Meyrick, 1891". Australian Faunal Directory. Archived 9 October 2012.
