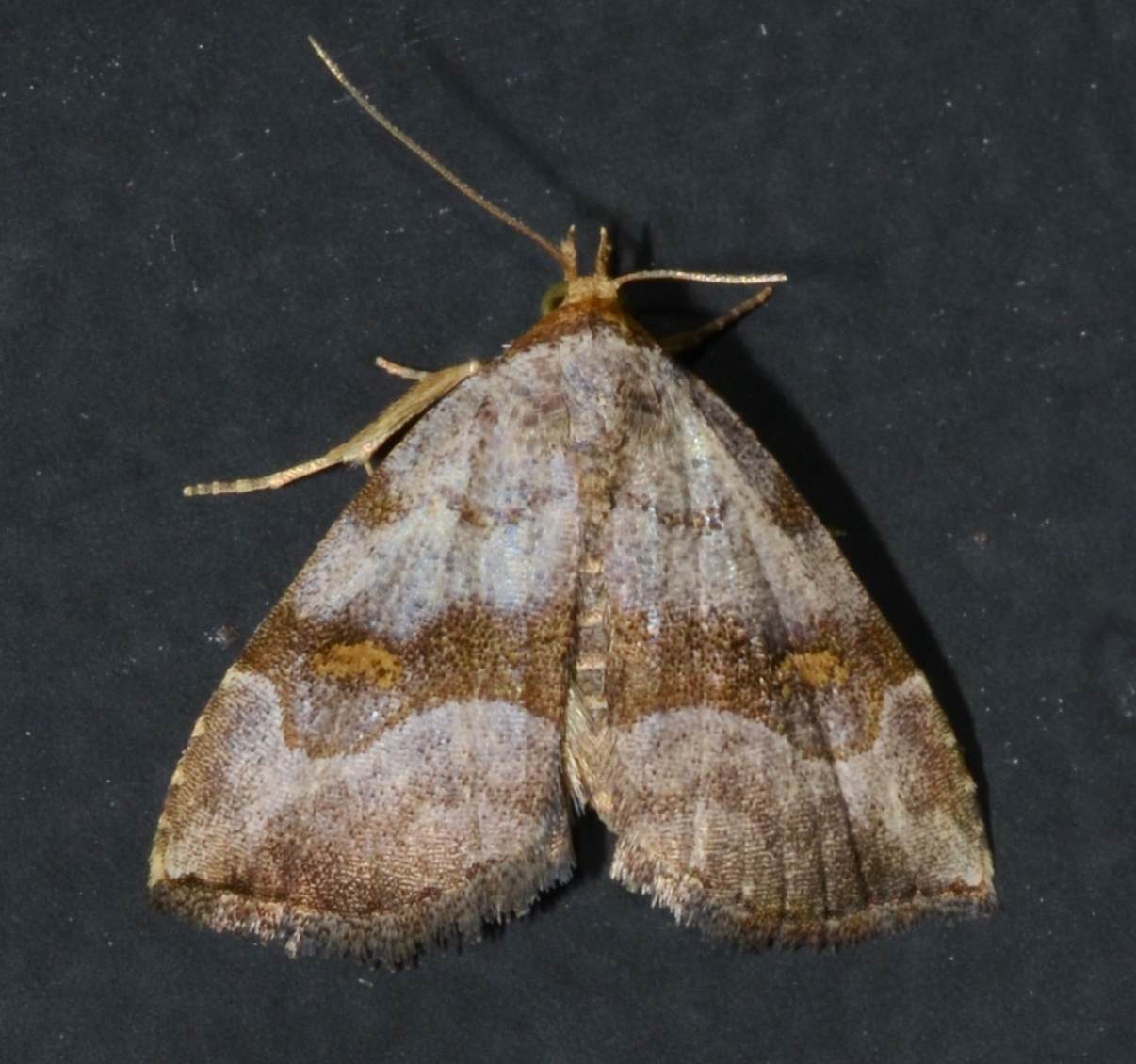

Scientific classification
- Kingdom: Animalia
- Phylum: Arthropoda
- Clade: Pancrustacea
- Class: Insecta
- Order: Lepidoptera
- Superfamily: Noctuoidea
- Family: Erebidae
- Genus: Oxycilla
- Species: O. malaca

Binomial name
- Oxycilla malaca (Grote, 1873)

Synonyms
- Erastria malaca Grote, 1873

= Oxycilla malaca =

Species of moth

Oxycilla malaca, the bent-lined tan, is a species of moth in the family Erebidae. It is found in North America, where it has been recorded from Georgia, Indiana, Kentucky, Mississippi, North Carolina, Ohio, Pennsylvania, South Carolina, Tennessee and Texas.

The wingspan is about 20 mm.

The MONA or Hodges number for Oxycilla malaca is 8407.

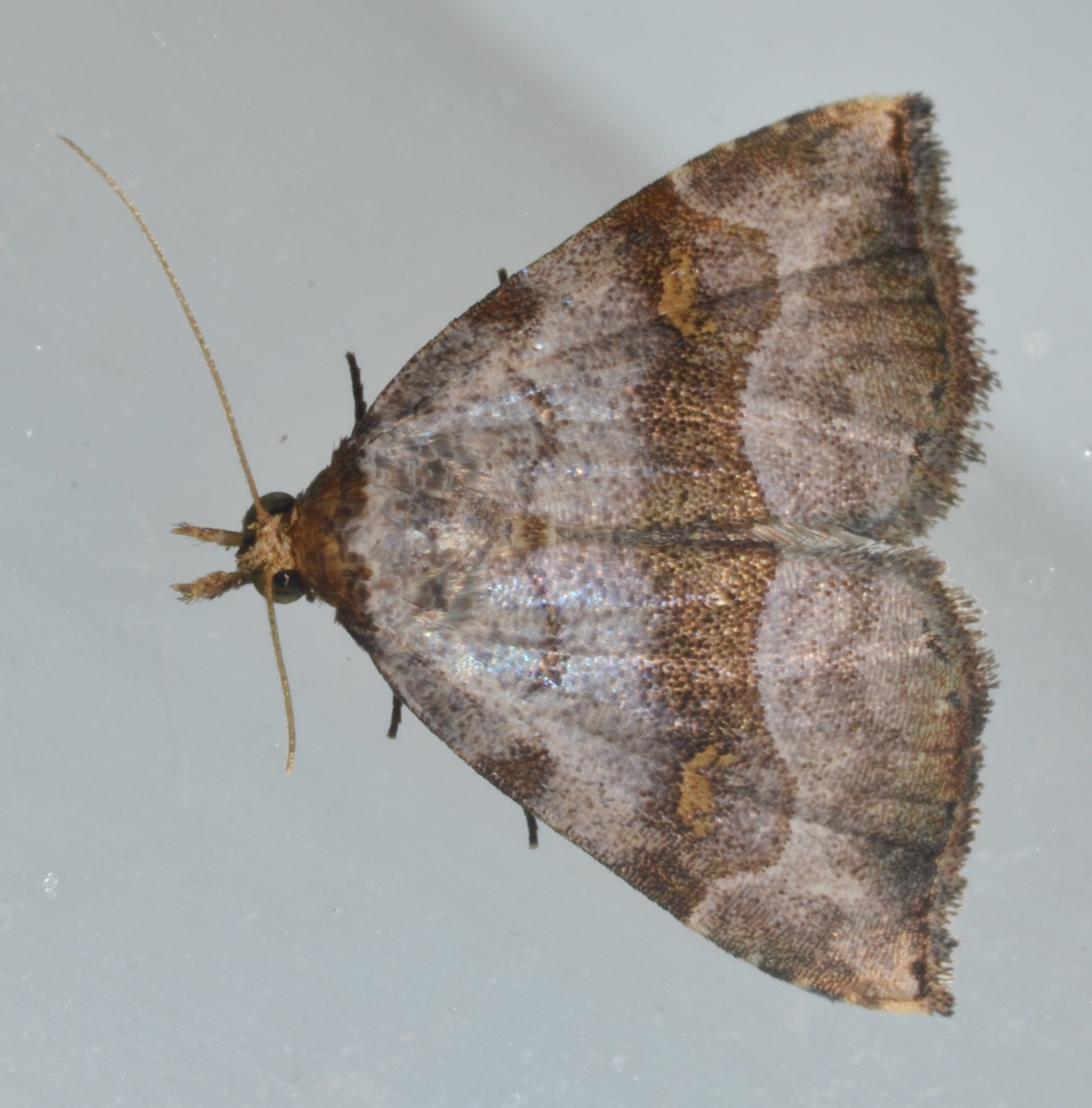
