= Rivula curvifera =

Scientific classification
- Kingdom: Animalia
- Phylum: Arthropoda
- Clade: Pancrustacea
- Class: Insecta
- Order: Lepidoptera
- Superfamily: Noctuoidea
- Family: Erebidae
- Genus: Rivula
- Species: R. curvifera

Binomial name
- Rivula curvifera (Walker, 1862)

Synonyms
- Hydrelia curvifera Walker, 1862; Erastria securifera Walker, 1863; Hyela senna C. Swinhoe, 1891; Toana anomosema Turner, 1945

Species of moth

Rivula curvifera is a moth of the family Erebidae first described by Francis Walker in 1862. It is found in Australia, China, Japan (Honshu, Shikoku, Kyushu, Tsushima Island), Taiwan and on the Korean Peninsula.

The wingspan is 7–9 mm.
