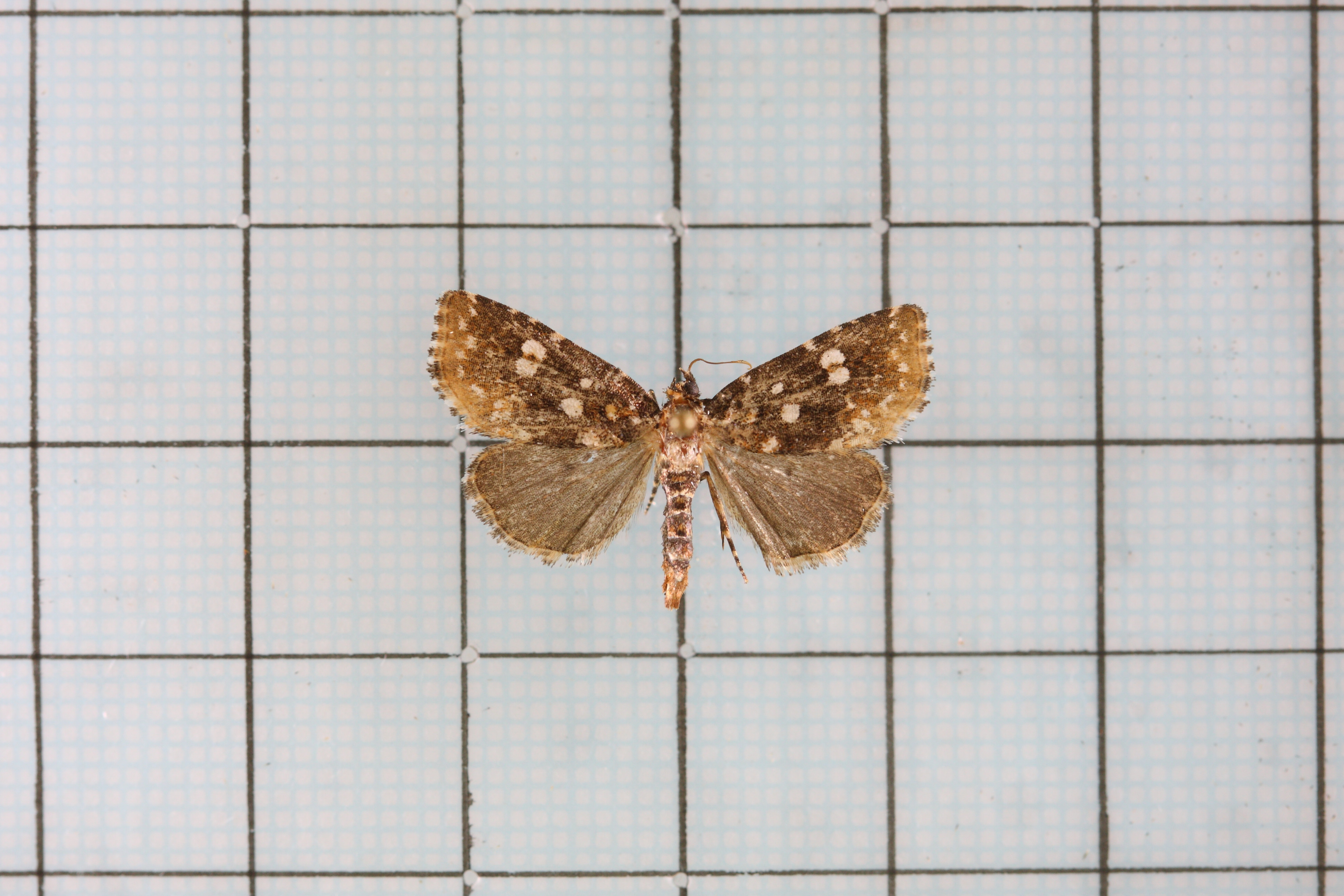

Scientific classification
- Domain: Eukaryota
- Kingdom: Animalia
- Phylum: Arthropoda
- Class: Insecta
- Order: Lepidoptera
- Superfamily: Noctuoidea
- Family: Erebidae
- Genus: Rivula
- Species: R. niveipuncta

Binomial name
- Rivula niveipuncta Swinhoe, 1905

= Rivula niveipuncta =

Species of moth

Rivula niveipuncta is a species of moth of the family Noctuidae. It is found in Asia, including India and Taiwan.
