= Rivula tanitalis =

Scientific classification
- Domain: Eukaryota
- Kingdom: Animalia
- Phylum: Arthropoda
- Class: Insecta
- Order: Lepidoptera
- Superfamily: Noctuoidea
- Family: Erebidae
- Genus: Rivula
- Species: R. tanitalis

Binomial name
- Rivula tanitalis Rebel, 1912

Synonyms
- Rivula sericealis tanitalis

Species of moth

Rivula tanitalis is a species of moth of the family Noctuidae first described by Hans Rebel in 1912. It is found in Morocco, Egypt, Algeria, Malta, Crete, Greece, Lebanon, Iraq, Iran, Saudi Arabia, Yemen and Israel.

The species is usually found in oases.

There are several generations per year.
