= Rivula biagi =

Scientific classification
- Domain: Eukaryota
- Kingdom: Animalia
- Phylum: Arthropoda
- Class: Insecta
- Order: Lepidoptera
- Superfamily: Noctuoidea
- Family: Erebidae
- Genus: Rivula
- Species: R. biagi

Binomial name
- Rivula biagi Bethune-Baker, 1908

Synonyms
- Rivula crassipes Turner, 1908

Species of moth

Rivula biagi is a moth of the family Erebidae first described by George Thomas Bethune-Baker in 1908. It is known from New Guinea and the Australian state of Queensland.
