= Rivula bioculalis =

Scientific classification
- Kingdom: Animalia
- Phylum: Arthropoda
- Clade: Pancrustacea
- Class: Insecta
- Order: Lepidoptera
- Superfamily: Noctuoidea
- Family: Erebidae
- Genus: Rivula
- Species: R. bioculalis

Binomial name
- Rivula bioculalis Moore, 1877

Synonyms
- Naranga albistriga Hampson, 1893; Rivula furcifera Hampson, 1907

Species of moth

Rivula bioculalis is a moth of the family Erebidae first described by Frederic Moore in 1877. It is found in Sri Lanka, the Andaman Islands, the Indian subregion, Taiwan, Thailand and Borneo.

Its forewings are pale ochreous brown. A darker discal spot is present. From the spot, a fine sinuous, oblique, slightly darker medial extends to the dorsum. Irregular sinuous postmedial runs parallel to it. Hindwings ochreous brown. Larval host plants are Oryza and Panicum species.
