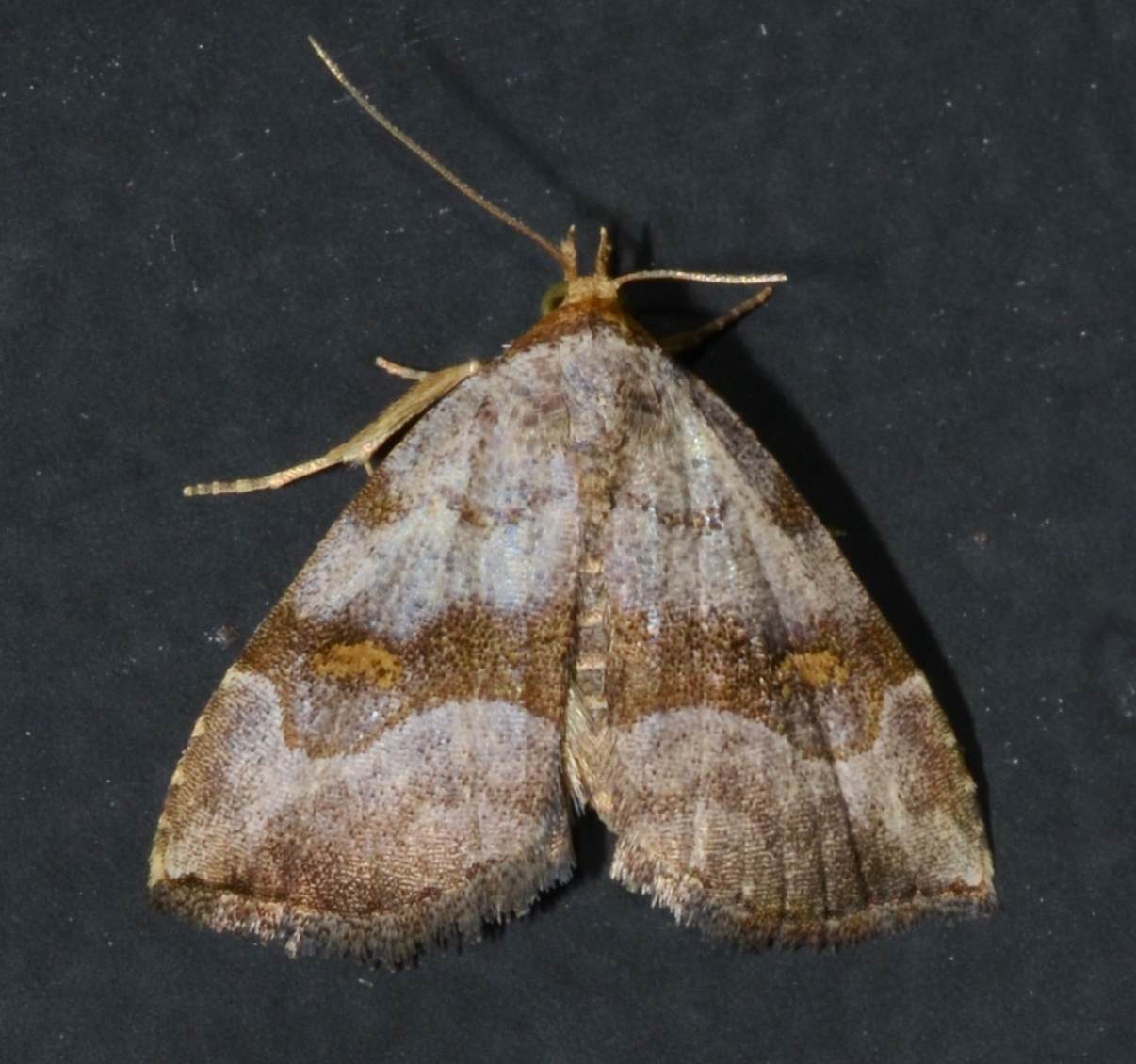

Scientific classification
- Kingdom: Animalia
- Phylum: Arthropoda
- Clade: Pancrustacea
- Class: Insecta
- Order: Lepidoptera
- Superfamily: Noctuoidea
- Family: Erebidae
- Subfamily: Rivulinae
- Genus: Oxycilla; Grote, 1896

= Oxycilla =

Genus of moths

Oxycilla is a genus of moths in the family Erebidae. The genus was erected by Augustus Radcliffe Grote in 1896.

== Species ==
- Oxycilla basipallida Barnes & McDunnough, 1916
- Oxycilla malaca Grote, 1873 – bent-lined tan moth
- Oxycilla mitographa Grote, 1873
- Oxycilla ondo Barnes, 1907
- Oxycilla tripla Grote, 1896
