= Bocula divergens =

Scientific classification
- Kingdom: Animalia
- Phylum: Arthropoda
- Clade: Pancrustacea
- Class: Insecta
- Order: Lepidoptera
- Superfamily: Noctuoidea
- Family: Erebidae
- Genus: Bocula
- Species: B. divergens

Binomial name
- Bocula divergens Prout, 1926

Species of moth

Bocula divergens is a moth of the family Erebidae first described by Prout in 1926. It is found in Borneo, Peninsular Malaysia, Sumatra and Thailand.
