= Oxycilla mitographa =

Scientific classification
- Kingdom: Animalia
- Phylum: Arthropoda
- Clade: Pancrustacea
- Class: Insecta
- Order: Lepidoptera
- Superfamily: Noctuoidea
- Family: Erebidae
- Genus: Oxycilla
- Species: O. mitographa

Binomial name
- Oxycilla mitographa (Grote, 1873)

Species of moth

Oxycilla mitographa, the oxycilla cane moth, is a species of moth in the family Erebidae. The species was first described by Augustus Radcliffe Grote in 1873. It is found in North America.

The MONA or Hodges number for Oxycilla mitographa is 8408.
