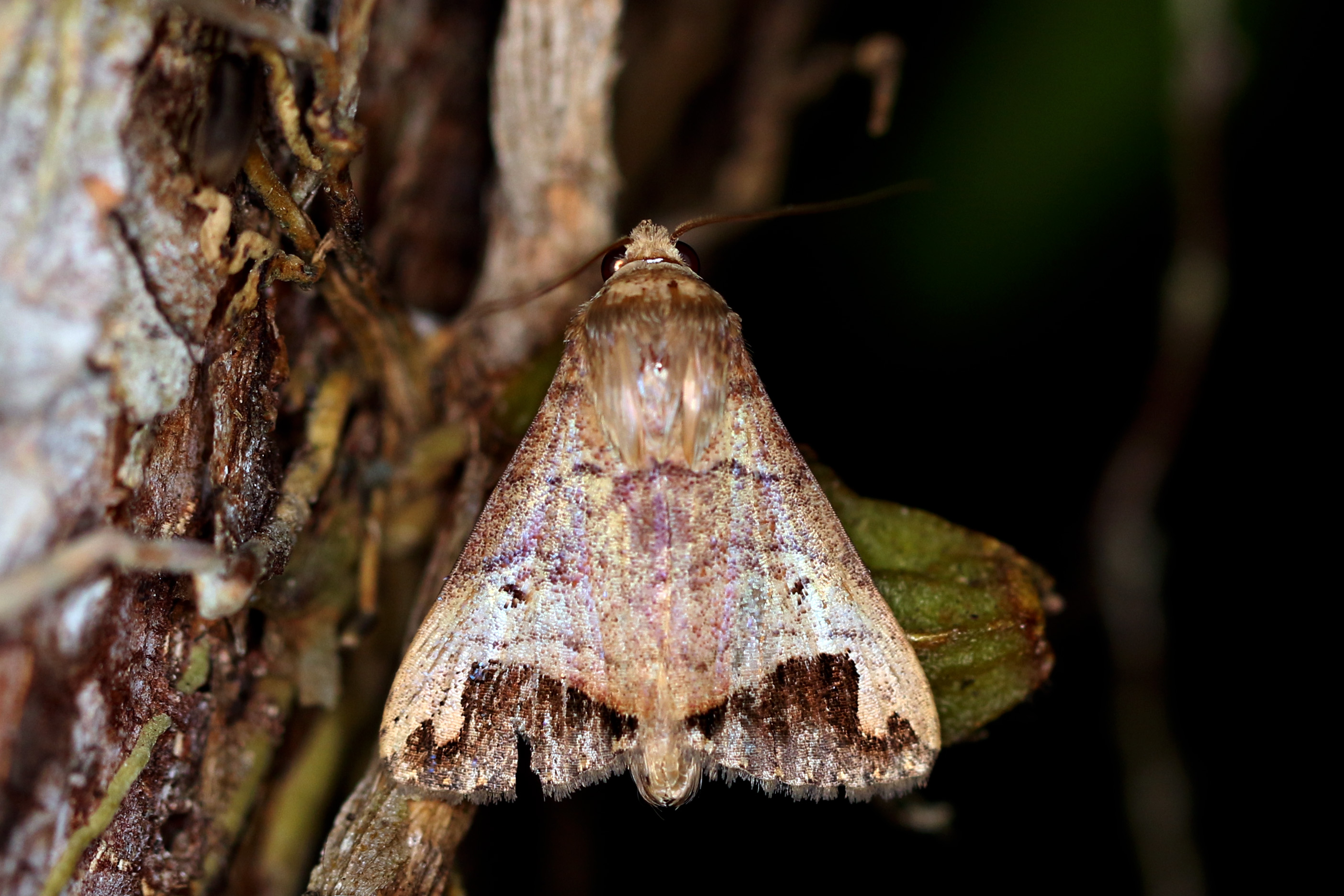
- Bocula marginata in Sabah, Borneo

Scientific classification
- Kingdom: Animalia
- Phylum: Arthropoda
- Clade: Pancrustacea
- Class: Insecta
- Order: Lepidoptera
- Superfamily: Noctuoidea
- Family: Erebidae
- Subfamily: Rivulinae
- Genus: Bocula; Guenée, 1852

Synonyms
- Borsippa Walker, 1858; Lacibisa Walker, [1863]; Aramuna Moore, 1884; Eudragana Butler, 1888; Sillophora Warren, 1912; Trichoptya Warren, 1912; Trapezoptera Hulstaert, 1924

= Bocula =

Genus of moths

Bocula is a genus of moths in the family Erebidae. The genus was erected by Achille Guenée in 1852.

== Description ==
Its palpi are slender and reaching vertex of head, where the third joint is minute. Thorax and abdomen smoothly scaled. Tibia fringed with hair. Forewings with rounded apex. Hindwings with vein 5 from lower angle of cell.

== Species ==
- Bocula anticlina Holloway, 2005
- Bocula bifaria Walker, 1863
- Bocula bimaculata (Snellen, 1880)
- Bocula brunneata Warren, 1912
- Bocula calthula Swinhoe, 1906
- Bocula caradrinoides Guenée, 1852
- Bocula diasticta Hampson, 1926
- Bocula diffisa (Swinhoe, 1890)
- Bocula divergens Prout, 1926
- Bocula erota Swinhoe, 1901
- Bocula gaedei Draudt, 1950
- Bocula hedleyi Holloway, 2005
- Bocula heliothina Hampson, 1926
- Bocula horus (Fawcett, 1916)
- Bocula ichthyuropis Hampson, 1926
- Bocula inconclusa (Walker, 1862)
- Bocula lamottei D. S. Fletcher & Viette, 1955
- Bocula limbata (Butler, 1888)
- Bocula lophoproctis Hampson, 1922
- Bocula macoma (Swinhoe, 1906)
- Bocula marginata (Moore, 1882)
- Bocula megastigmata (Hampson, 1894)
- Bocula metochrea Hampson, 1926
- Bocula microscala Holloway, 1976
- Bocula mollis Warren, 1912
- Bocula nigropunctata (Warren, 1912)
- Bocula nigrinsula Holloway, 2005
- Bocula obscurostola Holloway, 2005
- Bocula ochrigramma Hampson, 1926
- Bocula odontosema Turner, 1909
- Bocula orthosiana (Swinhoe, 1885)
- Bocula padanga (Swinhoe, 1916)
- Bocula pallens (Moore, 1882)
- Bocula poaphiloides (Walker, 1864)
- Bocula quadrilineata (Walker, 1858)
- Bocula samarinda Holloway, 2005
- Bocula sejuncta (Walker, 1856)
- Bocula sticticraspis Hampson, 1926
- Bocula terminata (Walker, 1869)
- Bocula tuhanensis Holloway, 1976
- Bocula undilineata Warren, 1912
- Bocula wuyiensis J.B. Sun, H.Q. Hu & H.L. Han, 2008
- Bocula xanthostola Hampson, 1926
