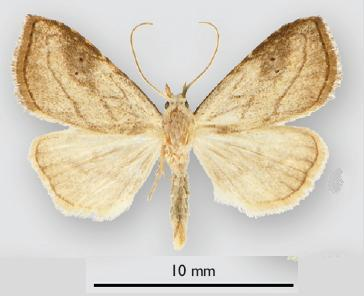

Scientific classification
- Domain: Eukaryota
- Kingdom: Animalia
- Phylum: Arthropoda
- Class: Insecta
- Order: Lepidoptera
- Superfamily: Noctuoidea
- Family: Erebidae
- Genus: Rivula
- Species: R. propinqualis

Binomial name
- Rivula propinqualis Guenée, 1854

= Rivula propinqualis =

Species of moth

Rivula propinqualis, the spotted grass moth or yellow snout-moth, is a moth of the family Erebidae. The species was first described by Achille Guenée in 1854. It is found throughout eastern North America from southern Canada southward to Florida and Texas and westward in the north to British Columbia and Washington. In North Carolina it is found from the Appalachian Mountains to the Atlantic coast.

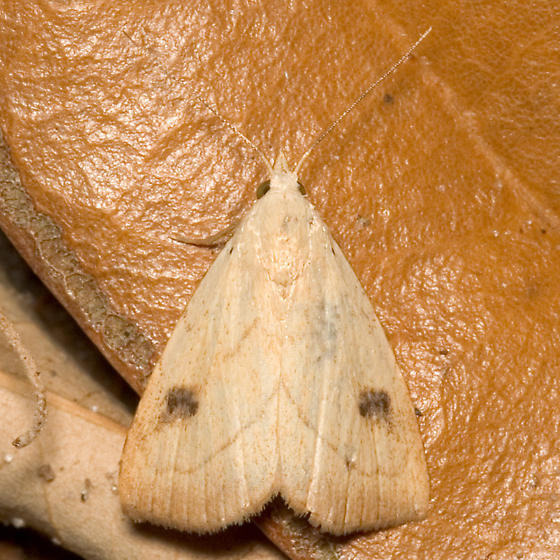

The wingspan is 15–19 mm. Adults are on wing from May to August.

The larvae feed on various grasses.
