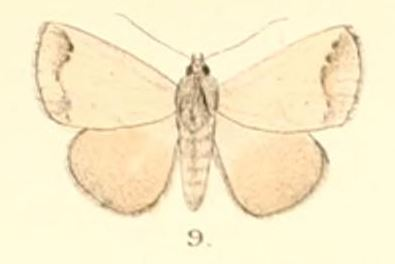

Scientific classification
- Kingdom: Animalia
- Phylum: Arthropoda
- Clade: Pancrustacea
- Class: Insecta
- Order: Lepidoptera
- Superfamily: Noctuoidea
- Family: Erebidae
- Genus: Bocula
- Species: B. pallens

Binomial name
- Bocula pallens (Moore, 1882)

Synonyms
- Poaphila pallens Moore, 1882

= Bocula pallens =

Species of moth

Bocula pallens is a moth of the family Erebidae first described by Frederic Moore in 1882. It is found in northern India, and Sri Lanka.

== Description ==
Its wingspan is about 22 mm. The male has fasciculate (bundled) antennae. Anal tuft very large. Underside of forewings with a patch of differently formed scales on median nervure. Hindwings shortened, with a large patch of flocculent (woolly) scaled below costa, the costal neuration being distorted downwards. Male with a patch of curved woolly hair on apical part of margin of hindwing. Male ochreous brown. Forewings with traces of antemedial, medial, and postmedial speckled lines. A purplish rufous marginal band narrowing to apex and outer angle and with a slight indentation near apex. A marginal series of pale specks present. Hindwings whitish. Female has inner edge of the marginal band of hindwings more curved inwards at centre.
