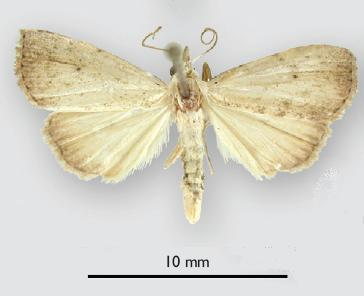

Scientific classification
- Domain: Eukaryota
- Kingdom: Animalia
- Phylum: Arthropoda
- Class: Insecta
- Order: Lepidoptera
- Superfamily: Noctuoidea
- Family: Erebidae
- Genus: Rivula
- Species: R. stepheni

Binomial name
- Rivula stepheni Sullivan, 2009

= Rivula stepheni =

Species of moth

Rivula stepheni is a species of moth of the family Erebidae first described by James Bolling Sullivan in 2009. It is found in the US in eastern North Carolina, Louisiana and Florida.

The wingspan is about 17 mm. Adults have been found from April to September in North Carolina, suggesting the species breeds continuously and likely has three or four generations per year.

The larvae feed on various grasses and sedges.
