= Rivula albistriga =

Scientific classification
- Kingdom: Animalia
- Phylum: Arthropoda
- Clade: Pancrustacea
- Class: Insecta
- Order: Lepidoptera
- Superfamily: Noctuoidea
- Family: Erebidae
- Genus: Rivula
- Species: R. albistriga

Binomial name
- Rivula albistriga (Hampson, 1893)

Synonyms
- Naranga albistriga Hampson, 1893; Rivula furcifera Hampson, 1907

Species of moth

Rivula albistriga is a moth of the family Erebidae first described by George Hampson in 1893. It is found in Sri Lanka.
