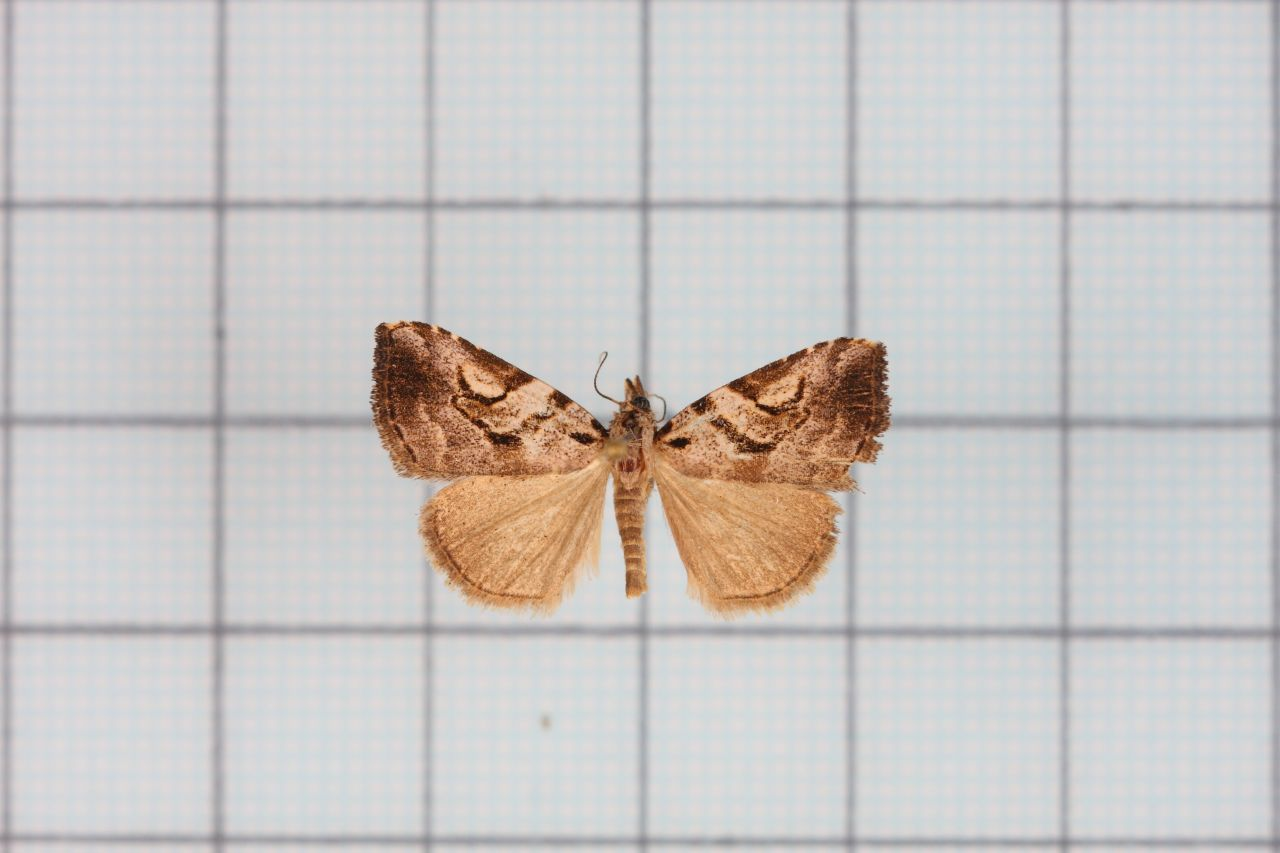

Scientific classification
- Domain: Eukaryota
- Kingdom: Animalia
- Phylum: Arthropoda
- Class: Insecta
- Order: Lepidoptera
- Superfamily: Noctuoidea
- Family: Erebidae
- Genus: Oglasa
- Species: O. mediopallens

Binomial name
- Oglasa mediopallens Wileman & South, 1917

Synonyms
- Oglasa mediopalens

= Oglasa mediopallens =

Species of moth

Oglasa mediopallens is a moth of the family Erebidae first described by Wileman and South in 1917. It is found in Taiwan.
