= Oxycilla tripla =

Scientific classification
- Kingdom: Animalia
- Phylum: Arthropoda
- Clade: Pancrustacea
- Class: Insecta
- Order: Lepidoptera
- Superfamily: Noctuoidea
- Family: Erebidae
- Genus: Oxycilla
- Species: O. tripla

Binomial name
- Oxycilla tripla Grote, 1896

Species of moth

Oxycilla tripla is a species of moth in the family Erebidae. It is found in North America.

The MONA or Hodges number for Oxycilla tripla is 8405.
