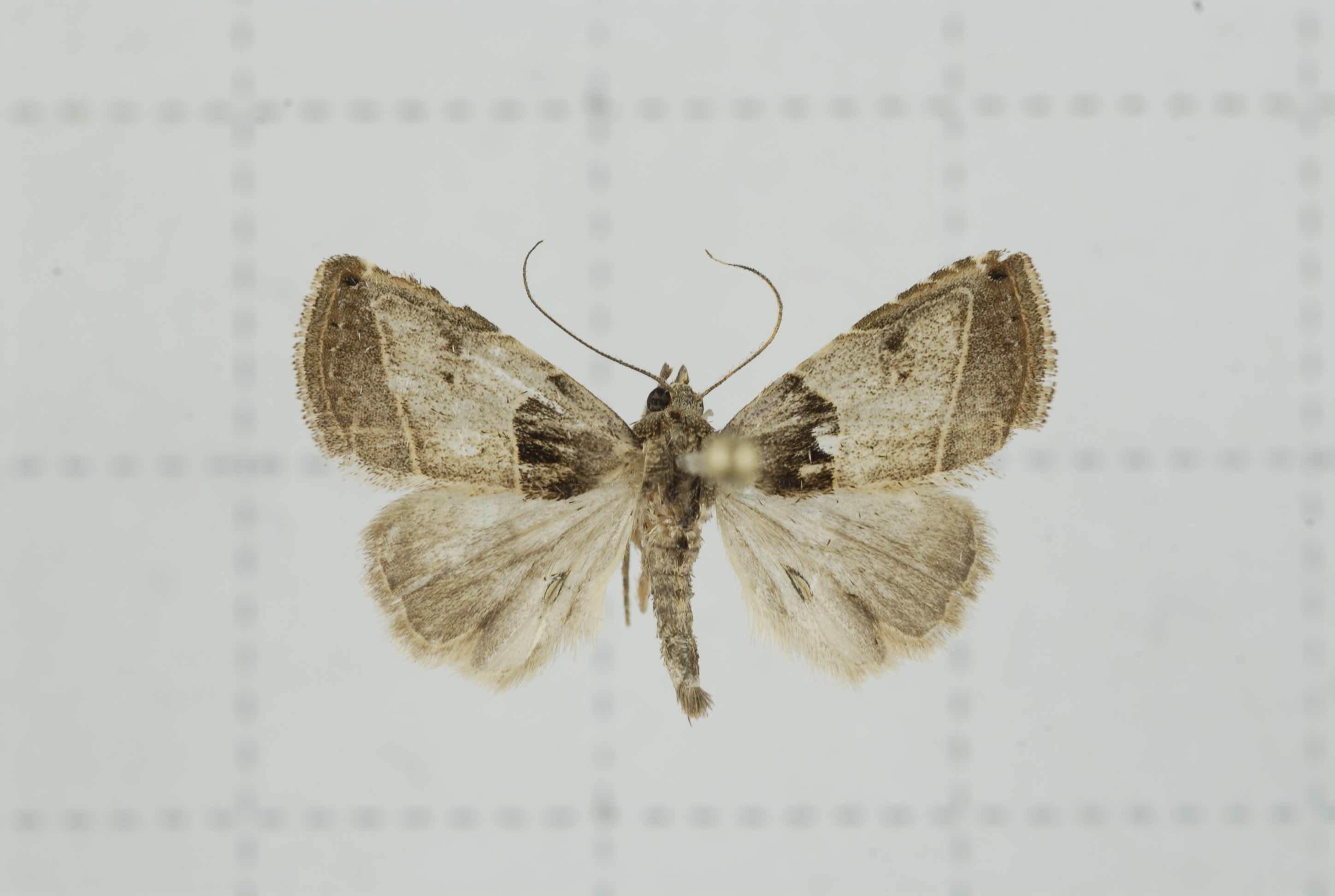

Scientific classification
- Kingdom: Animalia
- Phylum: Arthropoda
- Clade: Pancrustacea
- Class: Insecta
- Order: Lepidoptera
- Superfamily: Noctuoidea
- Family: Erebidae
- Genus: Rivula
- Species: R. basalis

Binomial name
- Rivula basalis Hampson, 1891

= Rivula basalis =

Species of moth

Rivula basalis is a moth of the family Erebidae first described by George Hampson in 1891. It is found in South India, Sri Lanka, Indo-China, Thailand, South China, Taiwan, Java, Bali and Borneo.

== Description ==
The female is ochreous with a rufous-brown tint, whereas the male is paler. Basal area of the forewing is much darker. Antemedial obtusely angled. A pale, subcostally angled postmedial visible. There is a dark shading around a bipunctate discal mark. Males possess hindwings with a subtornal cleft in the distal margin. The caterpillar has a greenish cylindrical body with a fine subdorsal white line. There is a broken, irregular, broad yellow spiracular band. Inter-segmental membranes are reddish. The bright yellowish head is heart shaped and marbled with blood red. Pupation occurs in a cocoon at the leaf tip. Host plants are grasses.

== Gallery ==
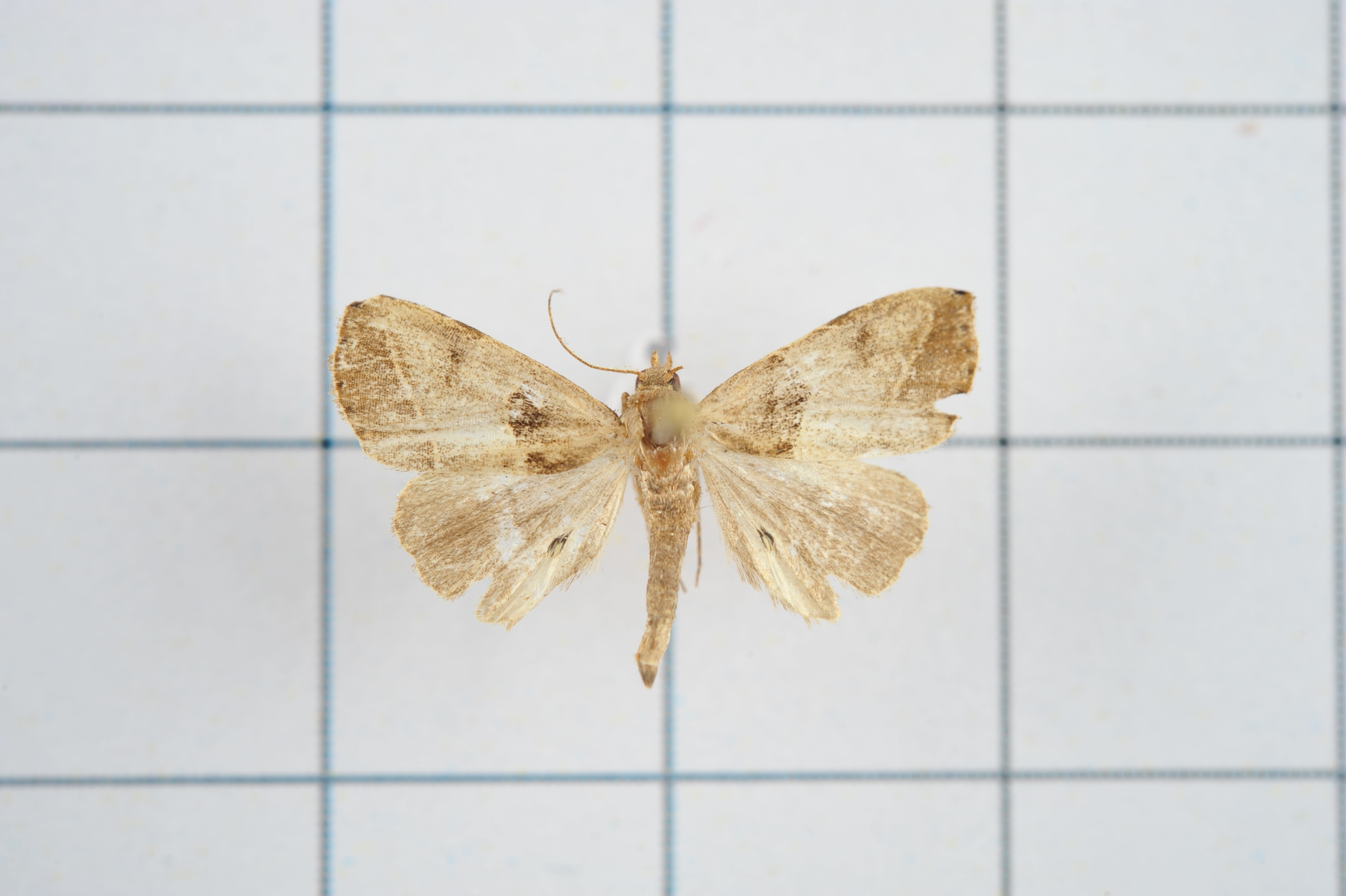

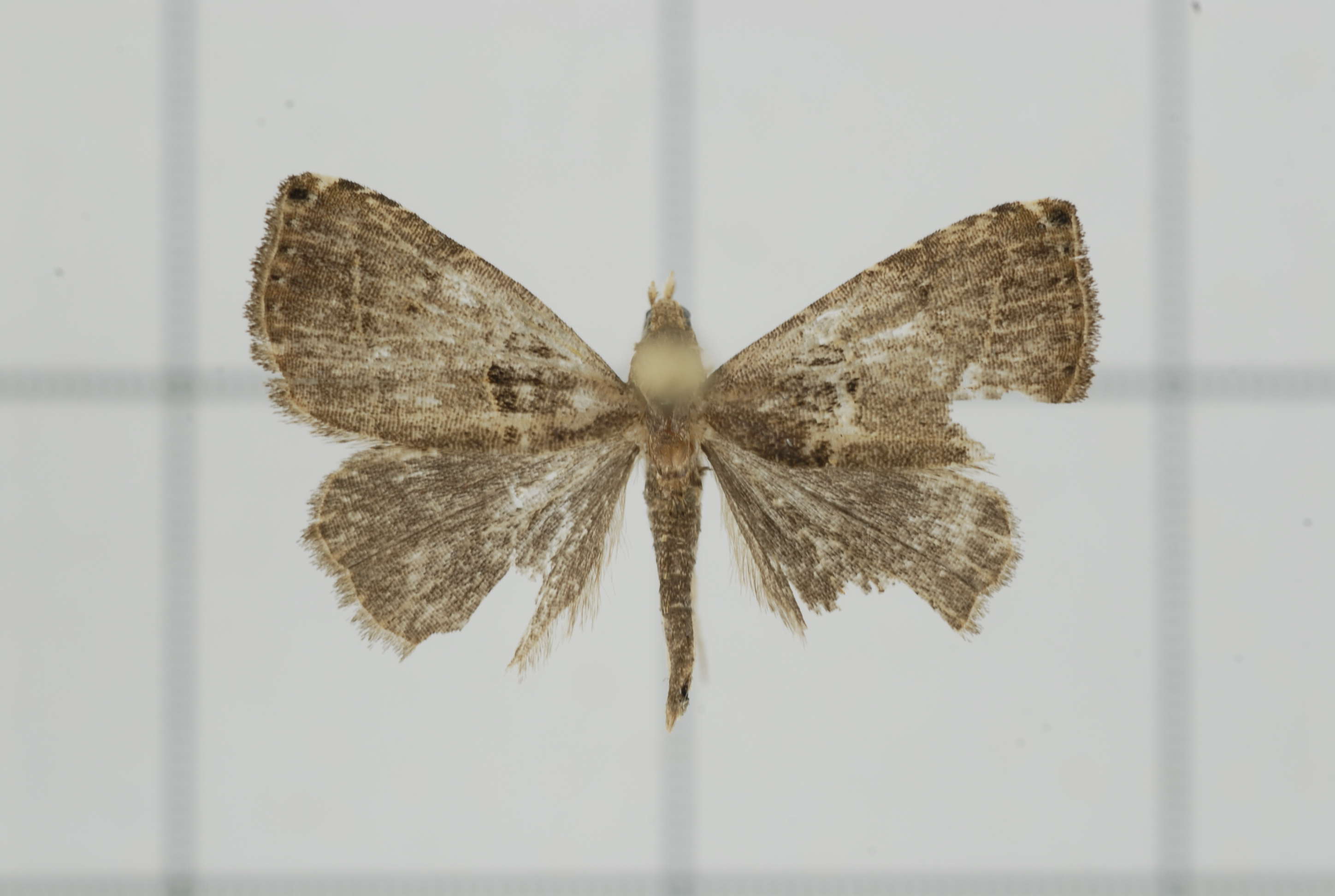

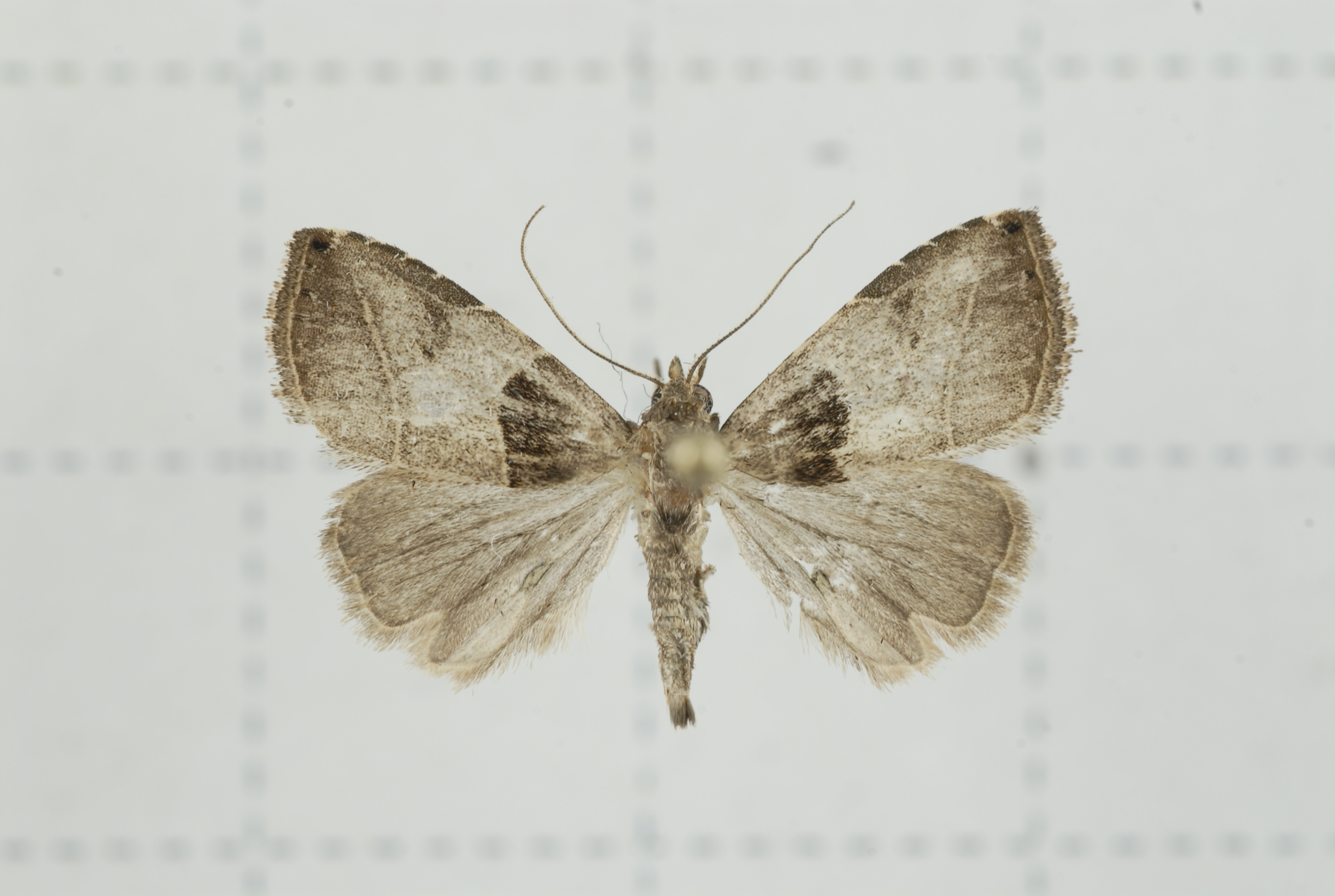

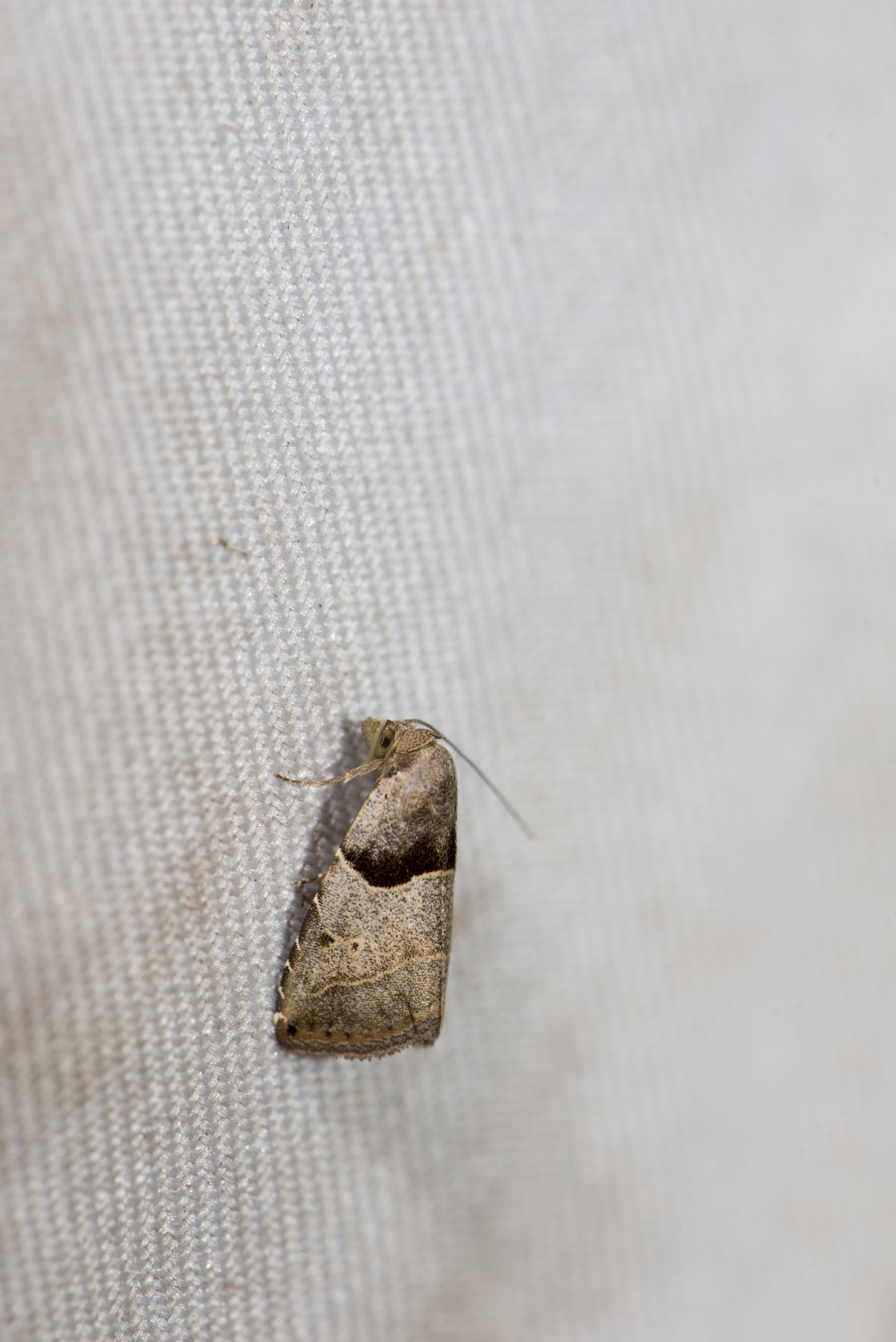
