= Rivula concinna =

Scientific classification
- Kingdom: Animalia
- Phylum: Arthropoda
- Clade: Pancrustacea
- Class: Insecta
- Order: Lepidoptera
- Superfamily: Noctuoidea
- Family: Erebidae
- Genus: Rivula
- Species: R. concinna

Binomial name
- Rivula concinna (T. P. Lucas, 1895)

Synonyms
- Thalpochares concinna T. P. Lucas, 1895; Rivula ommatopis Meyrick, 1902

Species of moth

Rivula concinna is a moth of the family Erebidae first described by Thomas Pennington Lucas in 1895. It lives in Australia in Queensland, Western Australia and the Northern Territory.
