= Bocula diasticta =

Scientific classification
- Kingdom: Animalia
- Phylum: Arthropoda
- Clade: Pancrustacea
- Class: Insecta
- Order: Lepidoptera
- Superfamily: Noctuoidea
- Family: Erebidae
- Genus: Bocula
- Species: B. diasticta

Binomial name
- Bocula diasticta Hampson, 1926

Synonyms
- Oglasa diasticta Hampson, 1926

Species of moth

Bocula diasticta is a moth of the family Erebidae first described by George Hampson in 1926. It is found in Borneo.
