= Janzena =

Scientific classification
- Kingdom: Animalia
- Phylum: Arthropoda
- Clade: Pancrustacea
- Class: Insecta
- Order: Lepidoptera
- Superfamily: Noctuoidea
- Family: Erebidae
- Genus: Janzena; Troubridge, 2020
- Species: J. pyraliformis

Binomial name
- Janzena pyraliformis Troubridge, 2020

Monotypic genus of moth

Janzena is a monotypic moth genus in the family Erebidae. It was first described by James T. Troubridge in 2020.

The genus contains a single species, Janzena pyraliformis, which is found in Costa Rica, Florida and Puerto Rico.

== Etymology ==
Gender feminine. This genus is named to honor Dr. Daniel H. Janzen.

== Host plant ==
In Costa Rica its larvae are common on Cassia sp.
