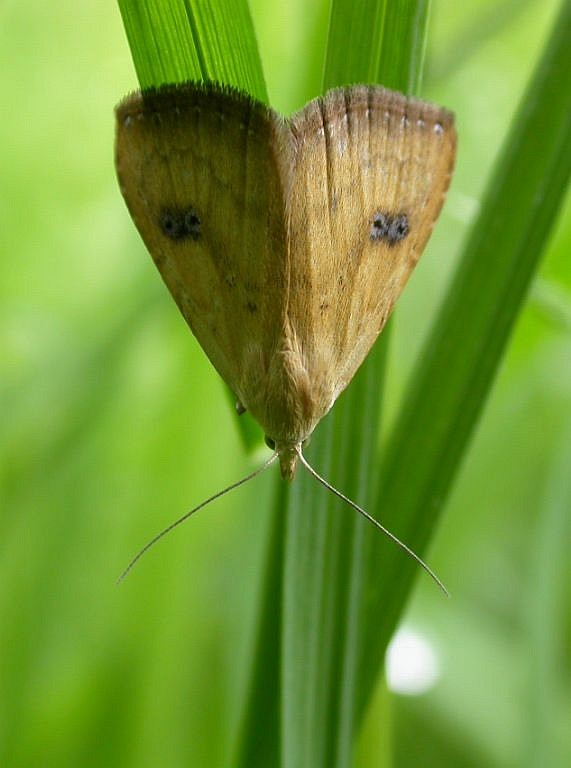
- Rivula sericealis

Scientific classification
- Kingdom: Animalia
- Phylum: Arthropoda
- Clade: Pancrustacea
- Class: Insecta
- Order: Lepidoptera
- Superfamily: Noctuoidea
- Family: Erebidae
- Subfamily: Rivulinae
- Genus: Rivula; Guenée in Duponchel, [1845]

Synonyms
- Cholimma Walker, [1863]; Motina Walker, 1863; Plotheia Walker, 1863; Rhazunda Walker, 1866; Pasira Moore, 1882; Rivulana Bethune-Baker, 1911; Prorivula Schaus, 1913; Euchromalia Schaus, 1916; Alikangiana Strand, 1920; Paurosceles Turner, 1945; Thopelia Nye, 1975

= Rivula =

Genus of moths

Rivula is a genus of moths in the family Erebidae described by Achille Guenée in 1845.

== Description ==
Palpi porrect (extending forward), the second joint thickly scaled, and third joint minute. A sharp front tuft present. Antennae minutely ciliated. Thorax and abdomen smoothly scaled. The typical section has the tibia of the male nearly naked. Forewings with nearly rectangular apex. Veins 7, 8 and 9 stalked. Hindwings with stalked veins 3 and 4.

== Species ==
- Rivula aenictopis Turner, 1908
- Rivula aequalis Walker, 1863
- Rivula albistriga (Hampson, 1893)
- Rivula albovenata Gaede, 1939
- Rivula anaemica Hampson, 1926
- Rivula anapsida de Joannis, 1929
- Rivula apsidiphora de Joannis, 1929
- Rivula arizanensis Wileman & South, 1916
- Rivula aroa Bethune-Baker, 1906
- Rivula asteria H. Druce, 1898
- Rivula atimeta C. Swinhoe, 1905
- Rivula auripalpis Butler, 1839
- Rivula basalis Hampson, 1891
- Rivula biagi Bethune-Baker, 1908
- Rivula bicolorana Legrand, 1965
- Rivula bioculalis Moore, 1877
- Rivula calamina Hampson, 1926
- Rivula calcaripuncta Holloway, 2008
- Rivula caledonica Holloway, 1979
- Rivula catadela D. S. Fletcher, 1961
- Rivula cognata Hampson, 1912
- Rivula concinna T. P. Lucas, 1895
- Rivula concolor Hulstaert, 1924
- Rivula constellata Hampson, 1926
- Rivula continentalis Gaede, 1939
- Rivula costinotata Hampson, 1926
- Rivula craspisticta Hampson, 1926
- Rivula curvata Gaede, 1939
- Rivula curvifera Walker, 1862
- Rivula curvilinea Wileman, 1911
- Rivula cyanepuncta Hampson, 1907
- Rivula cyclina (Mabille, 1900)
- Rivula didyma (Mabille, 1900)
- Rivula dimorpha Fryer, 1912
- Rivula dipterygosoma Tams, 1935
- Rivula dispar de Joannis, 1915
- Rivula distributa Walker, 1866
- Rivula dubitatrix Bryk, 1948
- Rivula endotricha Hampson, 1926
- Rivula erebina Hampson, 1926
- Rivula errabunda Wileman, 1911
- Rivula ethiopina Hampson, 1926
- Rivula everta C. Swinhoe, 1901
- Rivula faircloughi Holloway, 2008
- Rivula geminipunta Turner, 1945
- Rivula inconspicua Butler, 1881
- Rivula innotabilis Walker, 1863
- Rivula invertita (Berio, 1956)
- Rivula latipes Schaus, 1913
- Rivula leucanioides (Walker, 1863)
- Rivula leuconephra Hampson, 1926
- Rivula leucosticta C. Swinhoe, 1895
- Rivula lophosoma Hampson, 1926
- Rivula mageei Holloway, 2008
- Rivula manuselensis A. E. Prout, 1922
- Rivula maxwelli Robinson, 1975
- Rivula meeki Bethune-Baker, 1906
- Rivula microcyma Hampson, 1926
- Rivula microsticta Hampson, 1926
- Rivula modesta Gaede, 1939
- Rivula monorena Holloway
- Rivula niphodesma Meyrick, 1891
- Rivula niveipuncta C. Swinhoe, 1905
- Rivula ochracea Berio, 1956
- Rivula ochraceoides Poole, 1989
- Rivula ochrea (Bethune-Baker, 1911)
- Rivula pallida Moore, 1882
- Rivula parallella (Hampson, 1902)
- Rivula peruvensis Hampson, 1926
- Rivula plumipes Hampson, 1907
- Rivula polynesiana Hampson, 1926
- Rivula propinqualis Guenée, 1854 – spotted grass moth
- Rivula pusilla Möschler, 1890
- Rivula rentoni Holloway, 2008
- Rivula robinsoni Holloway, 2008
- Rivula rufescens Schaus, 1913
- Rivula sericealis Scopoli, 1763 – straw dot moth
- Rivula simulatrix Hampson, 1912
- Rivula sordida Walker, [1863]
- Rivula sororcula (Saalmüller, 1891)
- Rivula stepheni Sullivan, 2009
- Rivula striatura C. Swinhoe, 1895
- Rivula tanitalis Rebel, 1912
- Rivula trilineata Moore, 1888
- Rivula unctalis Staudinger, 1892
- Rivula vicarialis Walker, 1866
- Rivula violetta Schaus, 1904
