= A. chalcites =

A. chalcites may refer to:

- Abacetus chalcites, a ground beetle
- Autographa chalcites, a synonym of Chrysodeixis chalcites, a moth found in Europe and Africa
