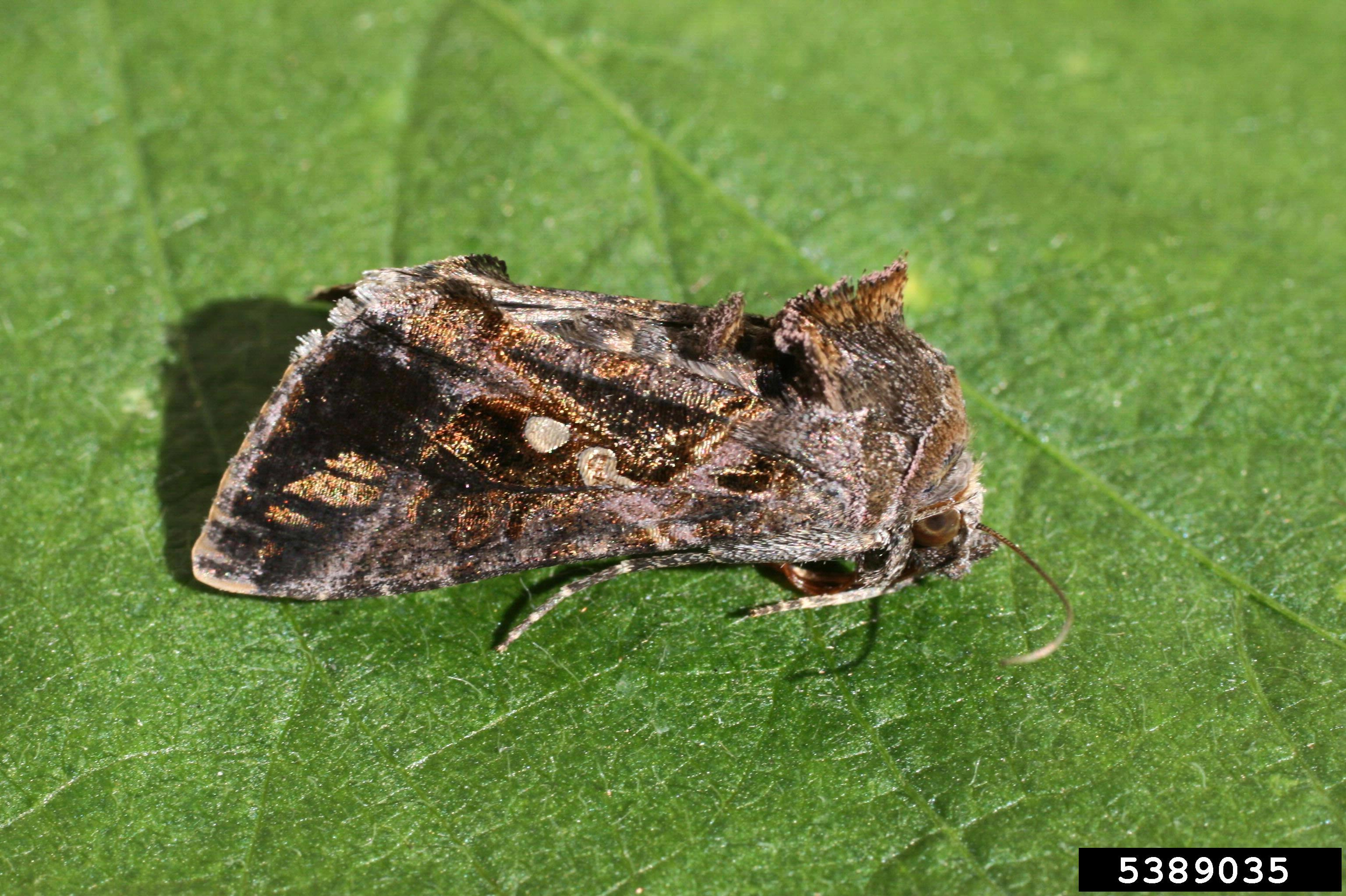

Scientific classification
- Kingdom: Animalia
- Phylum: Arthropoda
- Clade: Pancrustacea
- Class: Insecta
- Order: Lepidoptera
- Superfamily: Noctuoidea
- Family: Noctuidae
- Genus: Chrysodeixis
- Species: C. includens

Binomial name
- Chrysodeixis includens (Walker, 1858)

Synonyms
- Pseudoplusia includens; Plusia includens; Phalaena oo; Plusia hamifera; Plusia binotula; Plusia dyaus; Plusia pertusa; Plusia culta; Phytometra oo ab. oonana

= Chrysodeixis includens =

Species of moth

Chrysodeixis includens, the soybean looper (also known as falso medidor in northeastern Mexico), is a moth of the family Noctuidae. The species was first described by Francis Walker in 1858.

== Distribution and habitat ==
The soybean looper is found from southern Quebec and southern Ontario through the eastern and southern part of the United States to Central America and South America, the Antilles and the Galápagos Islands; the species is known to be migratory.

== Description ==
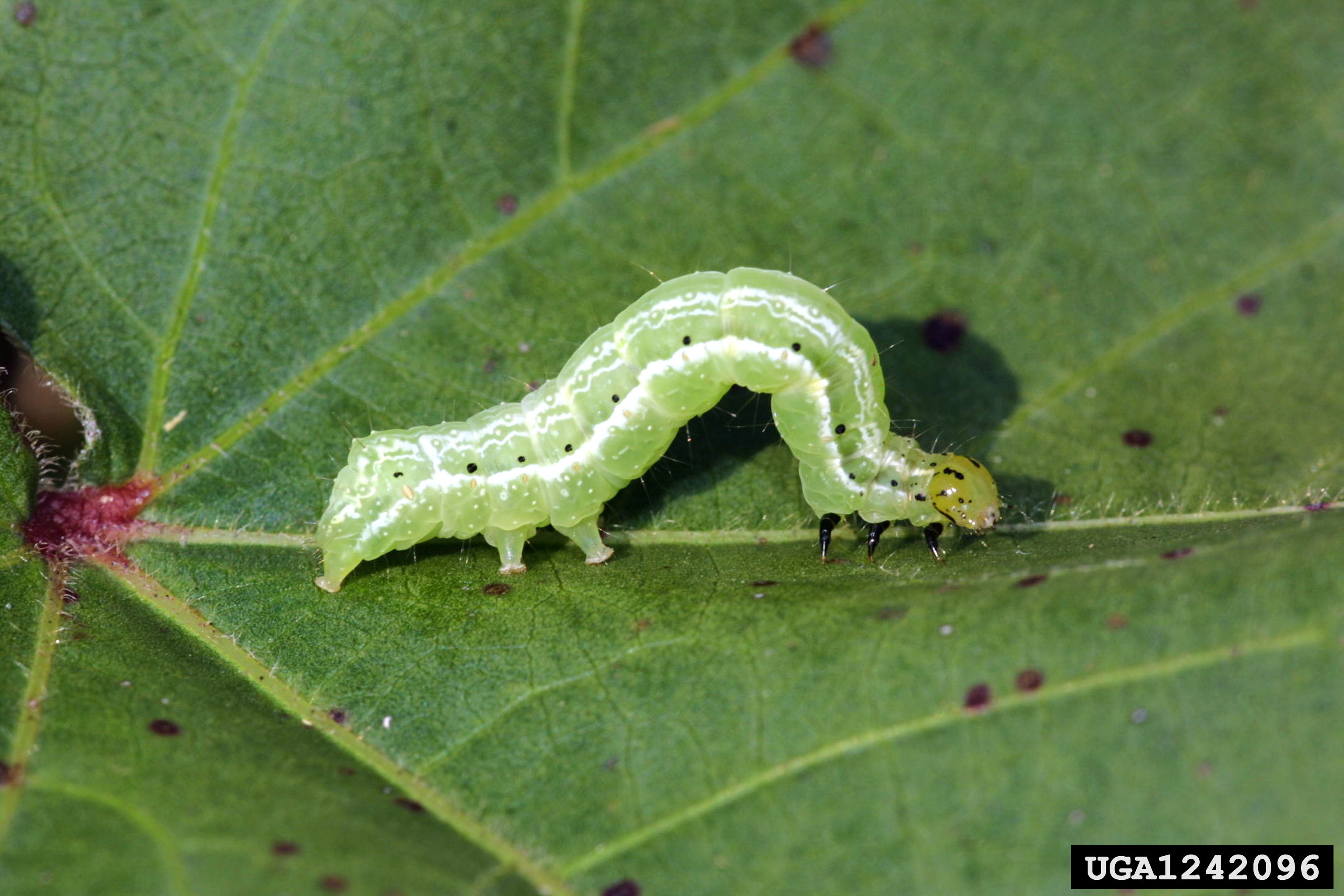
Caterpillar

The wingspan is 28–39 mm. The adults are on wing from April to November depending on the location's climate.

== Ecology ==
The larvae feed on a wide range of plants. Recorded food plants are varied species of the Asteraceae, Brassicaceae, Commelinaceae, Euphorbiaceae, Fabaceae, Geraniaceae, Lamiaceae, Lauraceae, Malvaceae, Solanaceae, Verbenaceae, including but not limited toMedicago sativa, Phaseolus polystachios, Glycine max, Gossypium herbaceum, Nicotiana tabacum, Solanum lycopersicum, Brassica spp. and Lactuca sativa.

The Mexican free-tailed bat (Tadarida brasiliensis) may feed on the soybean looper.
