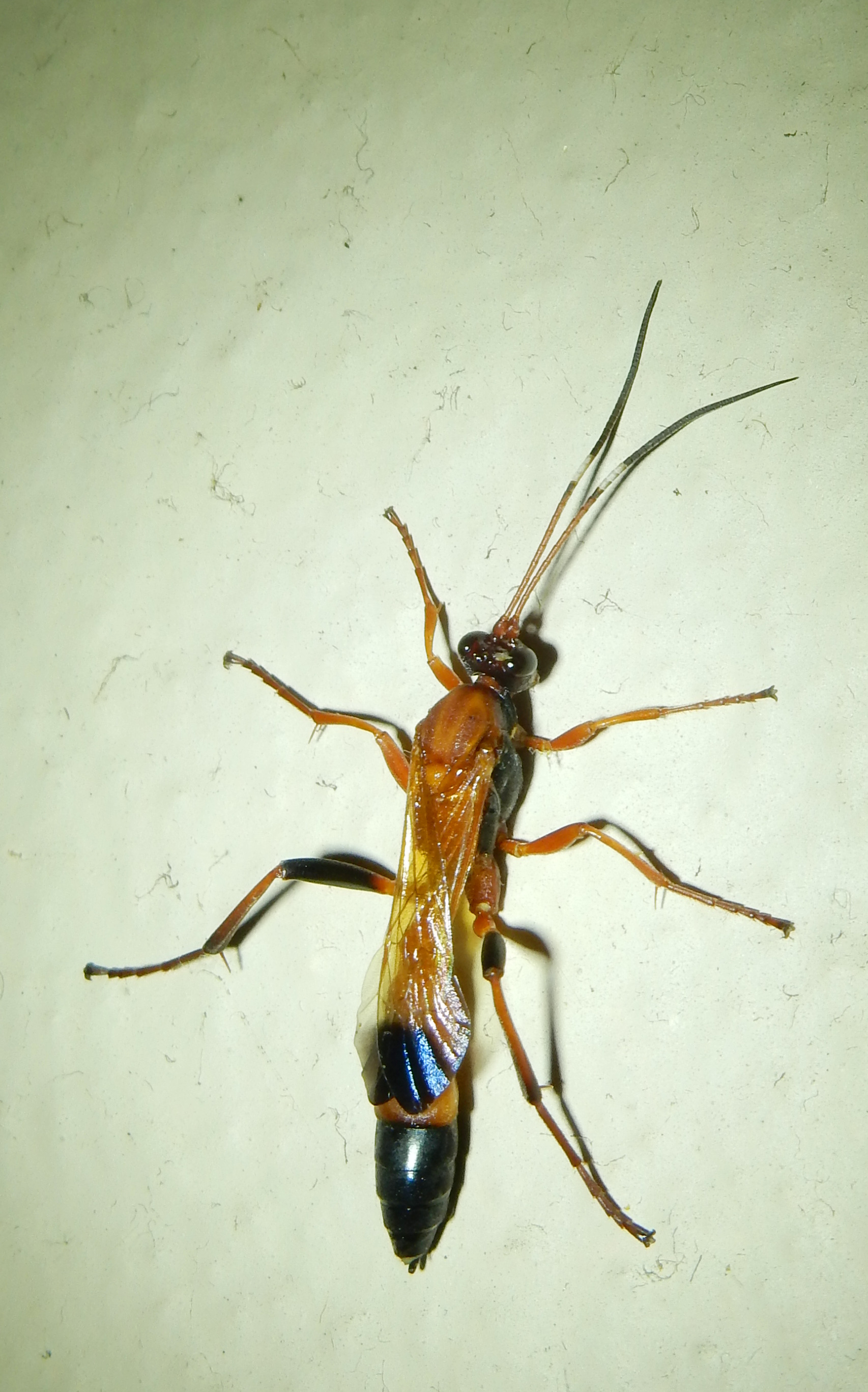

Scientific classification
- Kingdom: Animalia
- Phylum: Arthropoda
- Class: Insecta
- Order: Hymenoptera
- Family: Ichneumonidae
- Genus: Ctenochares
- Species: C. bicolorus

Binomial name
- Ctenochares bicolorus (Linnaeus, 1767)

Synonyms
- Ichneumon bicolorus

= Ctenochares bicolorus =

Species of wasp

Ctenochares bicolorus is a wasp in the family Ichneumonidae. Originally from Africa, this species has spread and is considered invasive in many other parts of the world. It is a pupal parasitoid of Chrysodeixis chalcites.
