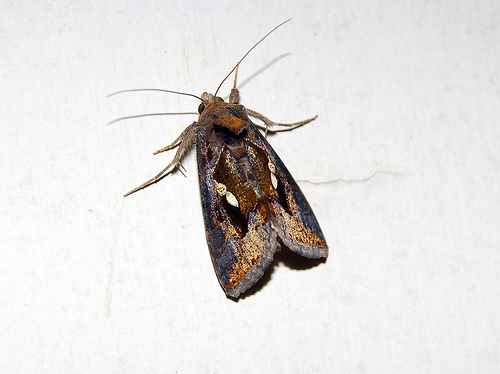

Scientific classification
- Domain: Eukaryota
- Kingdom: Animalia
- Phylum: Arthropoda
- Class: Insecta
- Order: Lepidoptera
- Superfamily: Noctuoidea
- Family: Noctuidae
- Genus: Chrysodeixis
- Species: C. eriosoma

Binomial name
- Chrysodeixis eriosoma (Doubleday, 1843)

Synonyms
- Plusia eriosoma Doubleday, 1843

= Chrysodeixis eriosoma =

Green garden looper

Species of moth

Chrysodeixis eriosoma, the green garden looper, known in New Zealand as the Silver Y, is a moth of the family Noctuidae. Mostly cosmopolitan in distribution, it is a pest in Japan, China, India, Sri Lanka, the Malay Peninsula and Australasia. It is present in Hawaii and recorded as an incursion in mainland North America and Russia. It is morphologically identical to Chrysodeixis chalcites and the two may be sibling species.

== Description ==
=== Adult ===
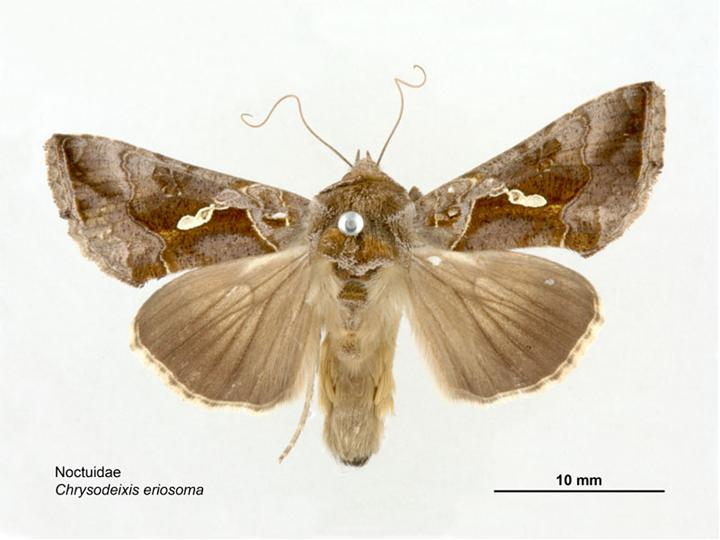
Dorsal view

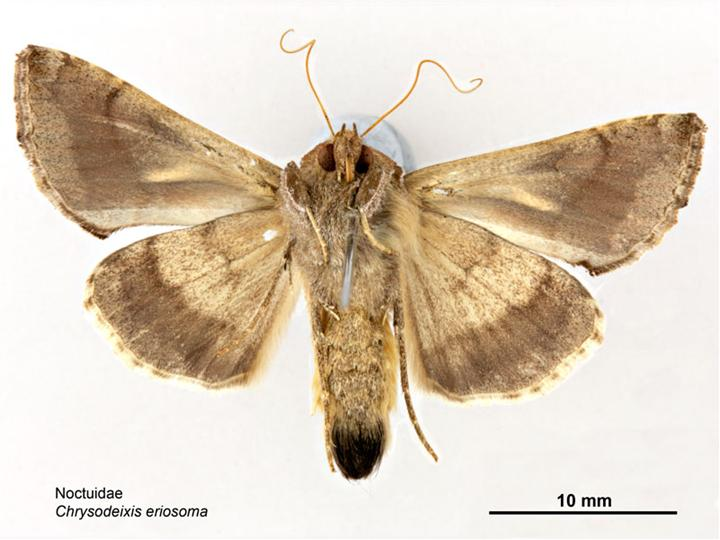
Ventral view

Chrysodeixis eriosoma has a wingspan of 42 mm. Some specimens are much darker than others.

Chrysodeixis eriosoma differs from C. signata in the head, thorax, and forewing having a reddish tinge; abdomen with the lateral and anal tufts often black in the male. Forewing with much more gilding on the basal, medial, and outer areas; the antemedial line more oblique, the postmedial more oblique and sinuous; the Y mark large, prominent, and golden, the arms often filled in with golden and occasionally joined to the tail.

Chrysodeixis eriosoma and Chrysodeixis chalcites moths cannot be separated morphologically, and they may be sibling species. However, they may be distinguished based on DNA sequencing, pheromones, or geographic origin as C. chalcites is found in the Palearctic and C. eriosoma in the tropical and subtropical regions of eastern Asia and the Pacific islands as well as in Australia and New Zealand. The species is abundant in agricultural areas and open habitats in lowlands and foothills but has been found at altitudes up to 2600m The literature referring to C. chalcites in southern and eastern Asia or Oceania may actually refer to C. eriosoma.

=== Larva ===
The larvae are green with a number of faint longitudinal dorsal and lateral white lines. They also sometimes have black dots on their sides. As for most other plusiine, they lack two pair of prolegs and thus move in a looper fashion, which is somewhat similar to caterpillars in the family Geometridae. They grow to a length of about 4 cm. They are polyphagous and have been reported to feed on over sixty species of plants.

== Life cycle ==
Duration of the pupal stage varies from a few days in summer to about a month in winter. Adults live from ten to twelve days.

== Pest status ==
C.eriosoma is a pest of crops in the Solanaceae, Leguminosae, Cruciferae, and Malvaceae.
