= Plusiopalpa hildebrandti =

Scientific classification
- Kingdom: Animalia
- Phylum: Arthropoda
- Clade: Pancrustacea
- Class: Insecta
- Order: Lepidoptera
- Superfamily: Noctuoidea
- Family: Noctuidae
- Genus: Plusiopalpa
- Species: P. hildebrandti

Binomial name
- Plusiopalpa hildebrandti (Saalmüller, 1891)

Synonyms
- Plusia hildebrandti Saalmüller, 1891

Species of moth

Plusiopalpa hildebrandti is a moth of the family Noctuidae. It is found in Madagascar.

This species is related to Chrysodeixis chalcites. The wingspan of the adult moths is 35 mm.

== Etymology ==
Max Saalmüller named this species after the botanist and traveller J.M. Hildebrandt who discovered this and other species for the collection of the Königliches Museum für Naturkunde (Royal Museum for Natural History), Berlin and who died in May 1881 in Antananarivo.
