= Peponis =

Peponis may refer to:

- Anastasios Peponis
- George Peponis
- Anadevidia peponis, a moth of the family Noctuidae
