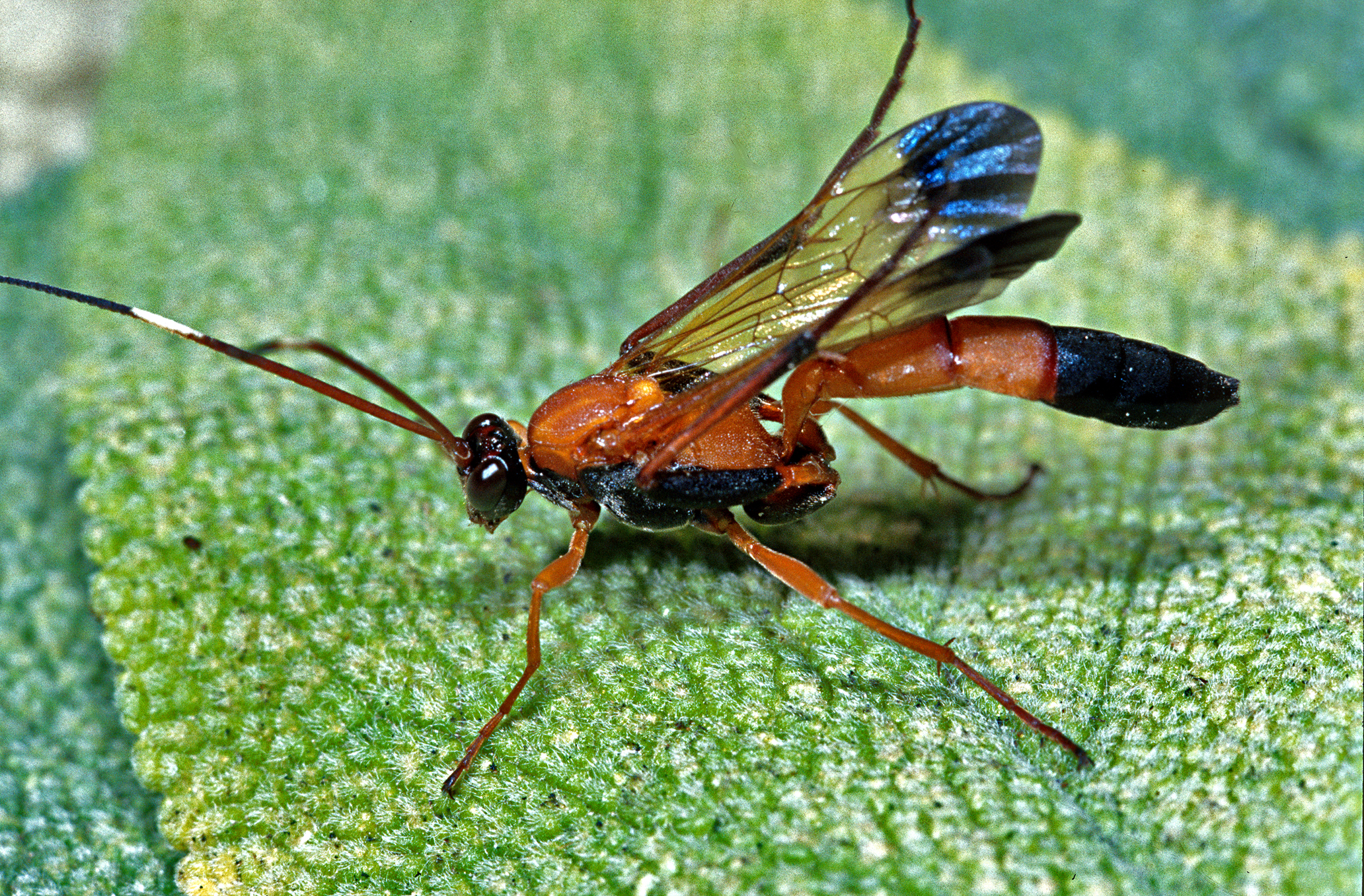
- Ctenochares bicolorus

Scientific classification
- Domain: Eukaryota
- Kingdom: Animalia
- Phylum: Arthropoda
- Class: Insecta
- Order: Hymenoptera
- Family: Ichneumonidae
- Tribe: Ichneumonini
- Genus: Ctenochares; Förster, 1869

= Ctenochares =

Genus of wasps

Ctenochares is a genus of wasps belonging to the family Ichneumonidae.

The genus has cosmopolitan distribution. The species of this genus are found in Europe, Southern Africa and Australia.

Species:

- Ctenochares amoenus (Saussure, 1892)
- Ctenochares bicolorus (Linnaeus, 1767)
- Ctenochares fulgens (Tosquinet, 1896)
- Ctenochares fulvidus (Tosquinet, 1896)
- Ctenochares luteus (Cameron, 1906)
- Ctenochares madagascariensis (Heinrich, 1938)
- Ctenochares microcephalus Morley, 1919
- Ctenochares pedestris Matsumura, 1911
- Ctenochares rufithorax (Kriechbaumer, 1894)
- Ctenochares testaceus Szepligeti, 1908
- Ctenochares vigilator (Fabricius, 1781)
