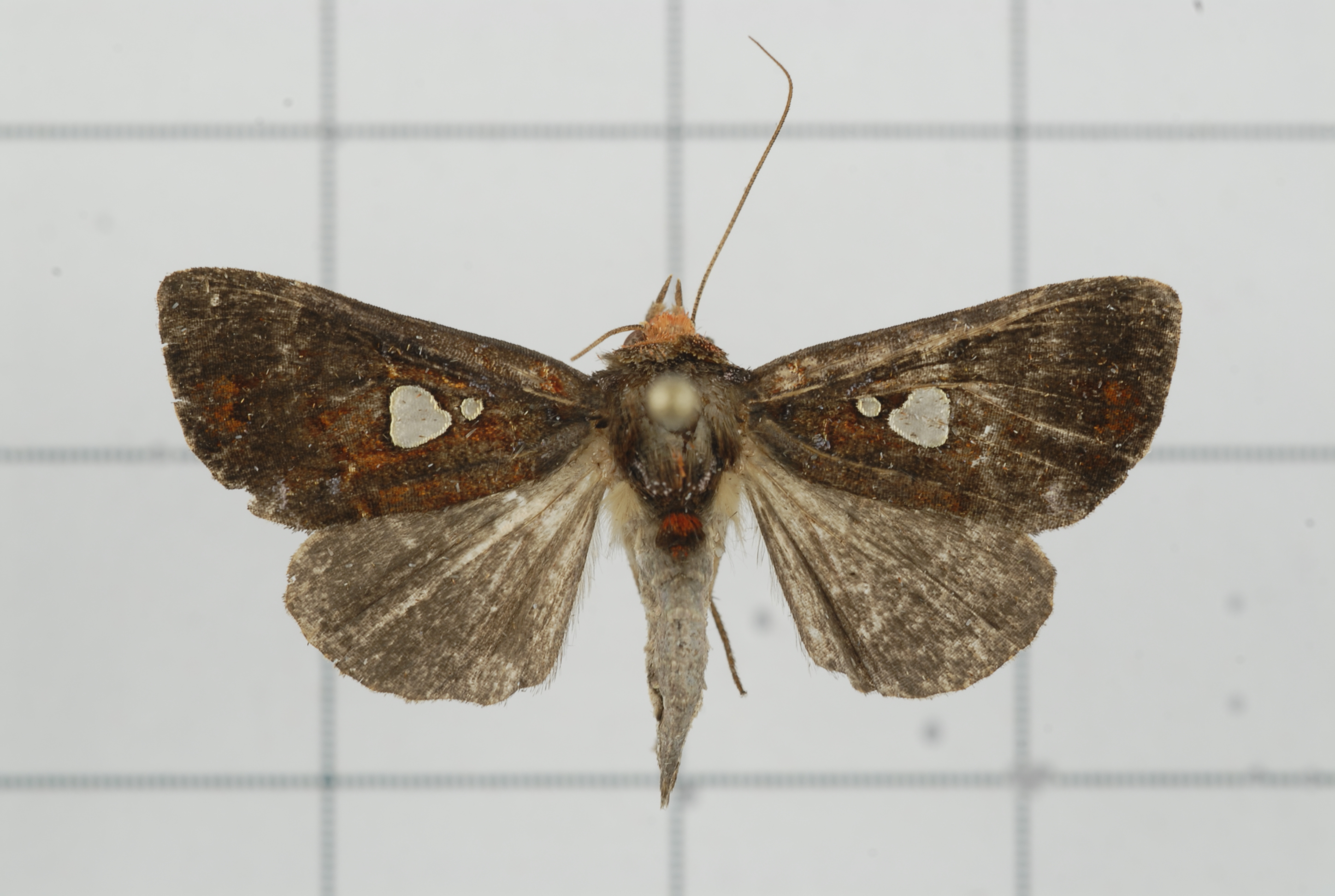

Scientific classification
- Kingdom: Animalia
- Phylum: Arthropoda
- Clade: Pancrustacea
- Class: Insecta
- Order: Lepidoptera
- Superfamily: Noctuoidea
- Family: Noctuidae
- Genus: Extremoplusia
- Species: E. megaloba

Binomial name
- Extremoplusia megaloba Hampson, 1912

Synonyms
- Plusia megaloba

= Extremoplusia megaloba =

Species of moth

Extremoplusia megaloba is a moth of the family Noctuidae. It is found in the North-eastern parts of the Himalaya over the Peninsular Malaysia and through Taiwan to Borneo.
