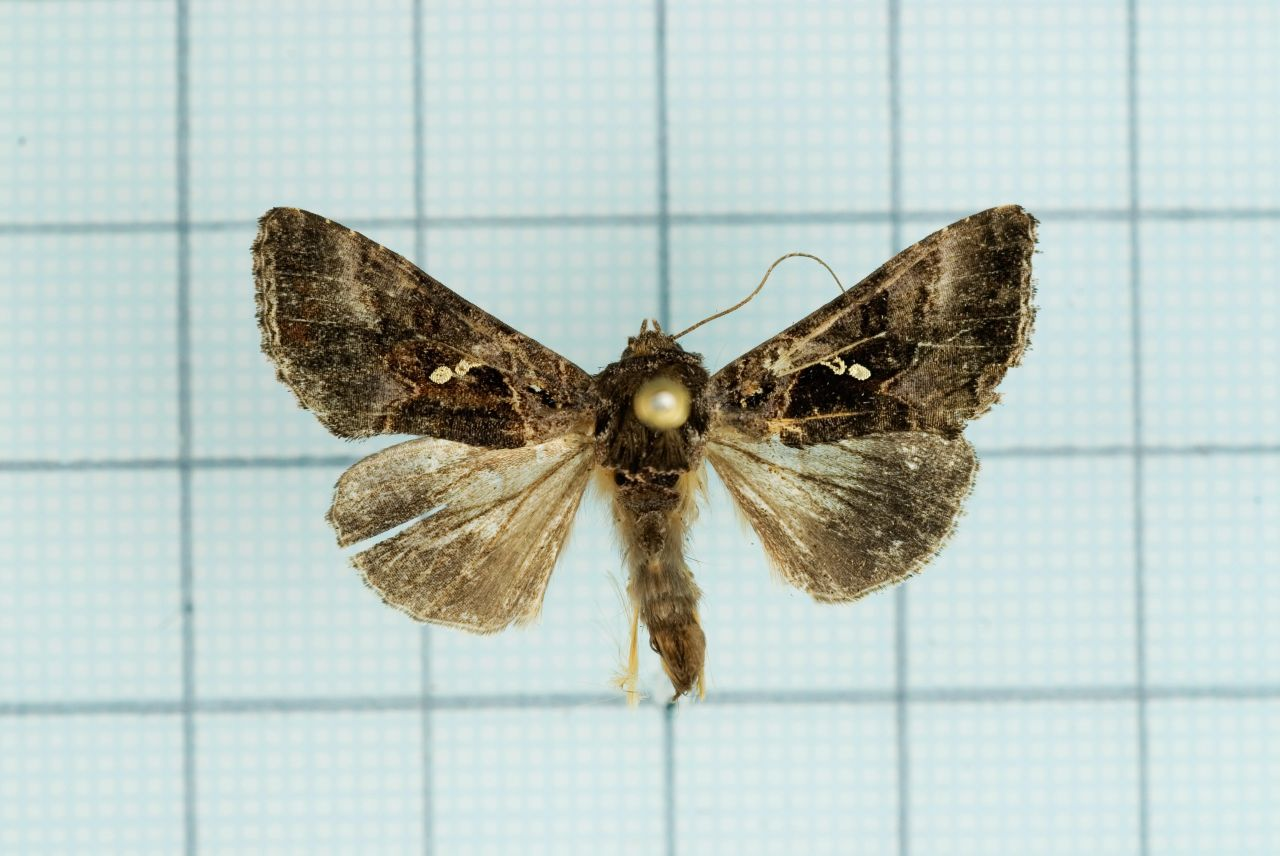

Scientific classification
- Domain: Eukaryota
- Kingdom: Animalia
- Phylum: Arthropoda
- Class: Insecta
- Order: Lepidoptera
- Superfamily: Noctuoidea
- Family: Noctuidae
- Genus: Chrysodeixis
- Species: C. minutus

Binomial name
- Chrysodeixis minutus Dufay, 1970

= Chrysodeixis minutus =

Species of moth

Chrysodeixis minutus is a moth of the family Noctuidae. It is found in Assam, Japan, China and Taiwan.
