= Anaplusia =

Scientific classification
- Domain: Eukaryota
- Kingdom: Animalia
- Phylum: Arthropoda
- Class: Insecta
- Order: Lepidoptera
- Superfamily: Noctuoidea
- Family: Noctuidae
- Tribe: Argyrogrammatini
- Genus: Anaplusia; Ronkay, 1987

Genus of moths

Anaplusia is a genus of moths of the family Noctuidae.

== Species ==
- Anaplusia pannosa (Moore, 1882)
