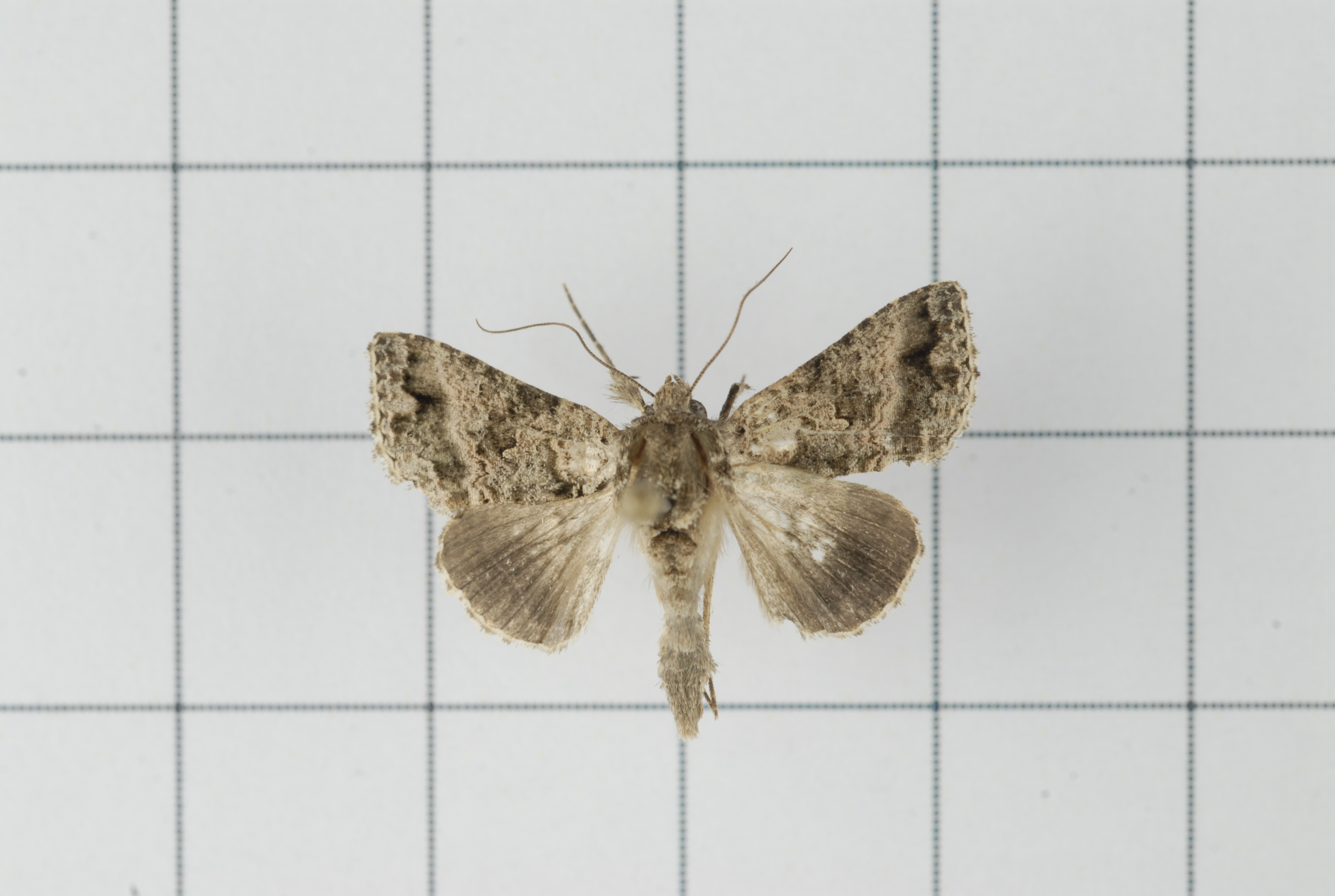
- Dactyloplusia sp.

Scientific classification
- Kingdom: Animalia
- Phylum: Arthropoda
- Clade: Pancrustacea
- Class: Insecta
- Order: Lepidoptera
- Superfamily: Noctuoidea
- Family: Noctuidae
- Tribe: Argyrogrammatini
- Genus: Dactyloplusia; Chou & Lu, 1979
- Species: D. impulsa

Binomial name
- Dactyloplusia impulsa Walker, 1865

Synonyms
- Plusia impulsa; ?Plusia roseata; ?Dactyloplusia roseata

= Dactyloplusia =

Genus of moths

Dactyloplusia is a monotypic genus of moths in the family Noctuidae erected by Chou Io and Lu Chinsheng in 1979. Its single species, Dactyloplusia impulsa, was first described by Francis Walker in 1865. It is found in Sri Lanka, India, southern China, Sundaland, Sulawesi, New Guinea, Fiji and Australia.

== Description ==
Its wingspan is about 30 mm. Palpi with short third joint. Hind femur of male not tufted with long hair. Head and thorax fiery orange. Abdomen pale. Forewings rosy greyish with brilliant coppery-red patches at the end of the cell, on inner medial area and at apex. The antemedial line is oblique and silvery. The distinct "Y-mark" is small, with tail disconnected from the arms. There are some slightly silvery marks at the end of the cell. The postmedial line is evenly curved and the sub-marginal line is slightly sinuous. Hindwings are pale fuscous.
