= Argyrogramma subaurea =

Scientific classification
- Domain: Eukaryota
- Kingdom: Animalia
- Phylum: Arthropoda
- Class: Insecta
- Order: Lepidoptera
- Superfamily: Noctuoidea
- Family: Noctuidae
- Genus: Argyrogramma
- Species: A. subaurea

Binomial name
- Argyrogramma subaurea Dufay, 1972

Species of moth

Argyrogramma subaurea is a moth of the family Noctuidae. It is found in Africa, including (and possibly restricted to) Ivory Coast.
