= Shensiplusia =

Scientific classification
- Domain: Eukaryota
- Kingdom: Animalia
- Phylum: Arthropoda
- Class: Insecta
- Order: Lepidoptera
- Superfamily: Noctuoidea
- Family: Noctuidae
- Subfamily: Plusiinae
- Genus: Shensiplusia; Chou & Lu, 1974

Genus of moths

Shensiplusia was a genus of moths of the family Noctuidae. The species in the genus have been transferred to Chrysodeixis.
