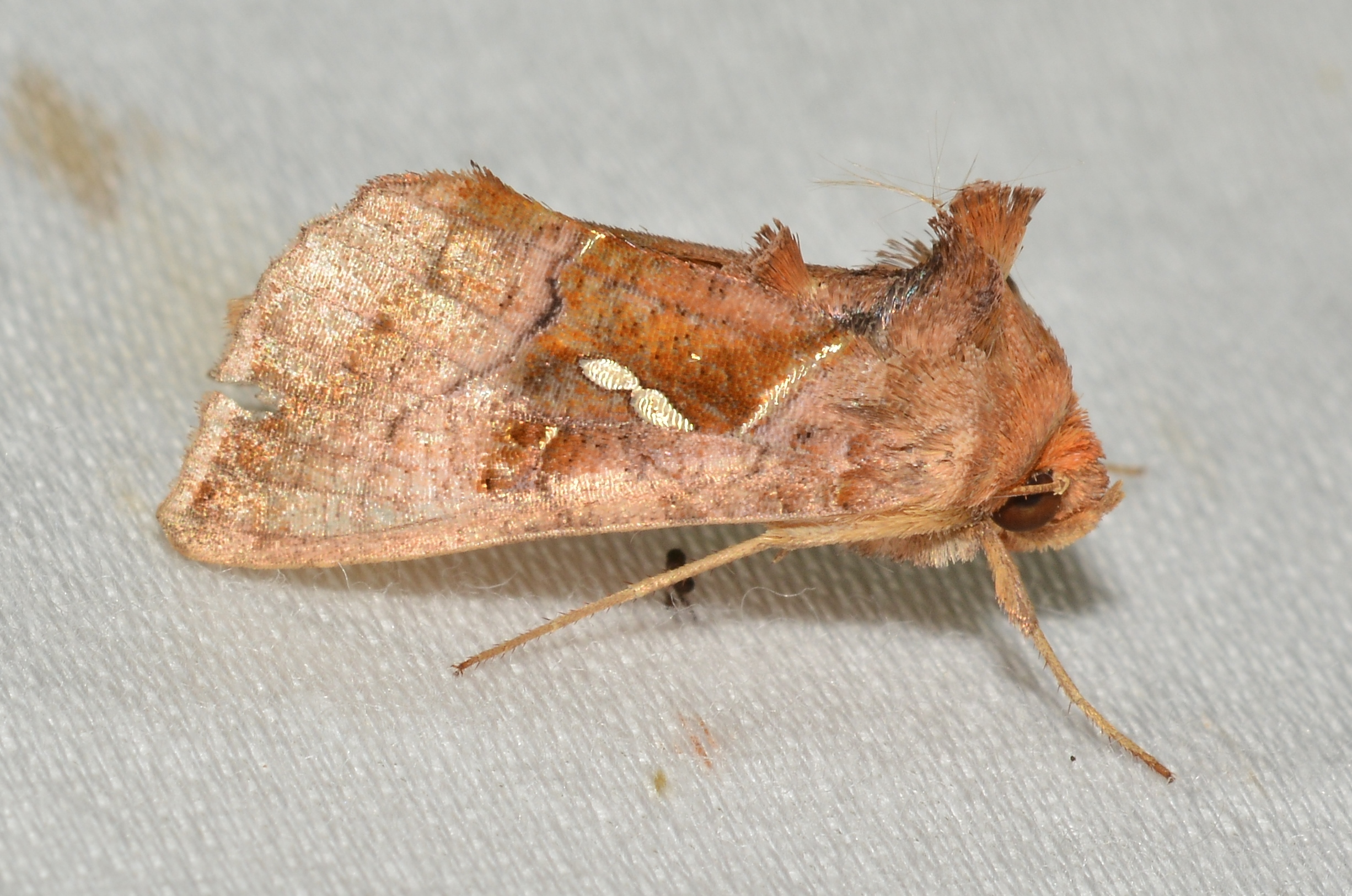

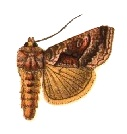

Scientific classification
- Kingdom: Animalia
- Phylum: Arthropoda
- Class: Insecta
- Order: Lepidoptera
- Superfamily: Noctuoidea
- Family: Noctuidae
- Genus: Enigmogramma
- Species: E. basigera

Binomial name
- Enigmogramma basigera (Walker, 1865)

Synonyms
- Plusia basigera Walker, 1865; Plusia laticlavia Morrison, 1875; Argyrogramma basigera; Phytometra basigera

= Enigmogramma basigera =

Species of moth

Enigmogramma basigera, the pink-washed looper, is a moth of the family Noctuidae. The species was first described by Francis Walker in 1865. It is found in the eastern and central United States, south to Mexico. It is also found in the Caribbean (including Guadeloupe, Martinique, St. Kitts and Montserrat), south to French Guiana.

The wingspan is about 28–33 mm. Adults are on wing from June to September.

Only two larvae are known, and these were reared on Hydrocotyle umbellata.
