= Scriptoplusia nigriluna =

Scientific classification
- Kingdom: Animalia
- Phylum: Arthropoda
- Class: Insecta
- Order: Lepidoptera
- Superfamily: Noctuoidea
- Family: Noctuidae
- Genus: Scriptoplusia
- Species: S. nigriluna

Binomial name
- Scriptoplusia nigriluna (Walker, [1858])

Synonyms
- Plusia nigriluna Walker, [1858]; Argyrogramma hokowensis I. Chou & T. Lu, 1979; Scriptoplusia kuznetzovi Klyuchko & L. Ronkay, 1990; Plusia didymospila Turner, 1933

Species of moth

Scriptoplusia nigriluna is a moth of the family Noctuidae first described by Francis Walker in 1858. It is found throughout the Oriental tropics of India, Sri Lanka, Bangladesh, Japan and the South East Asian region.

Two subspecies are known - Scriptoplusia nigriluna nigriluna and Scriptoplusia nigriluna noona. Larval host plants include Acalypha species.
