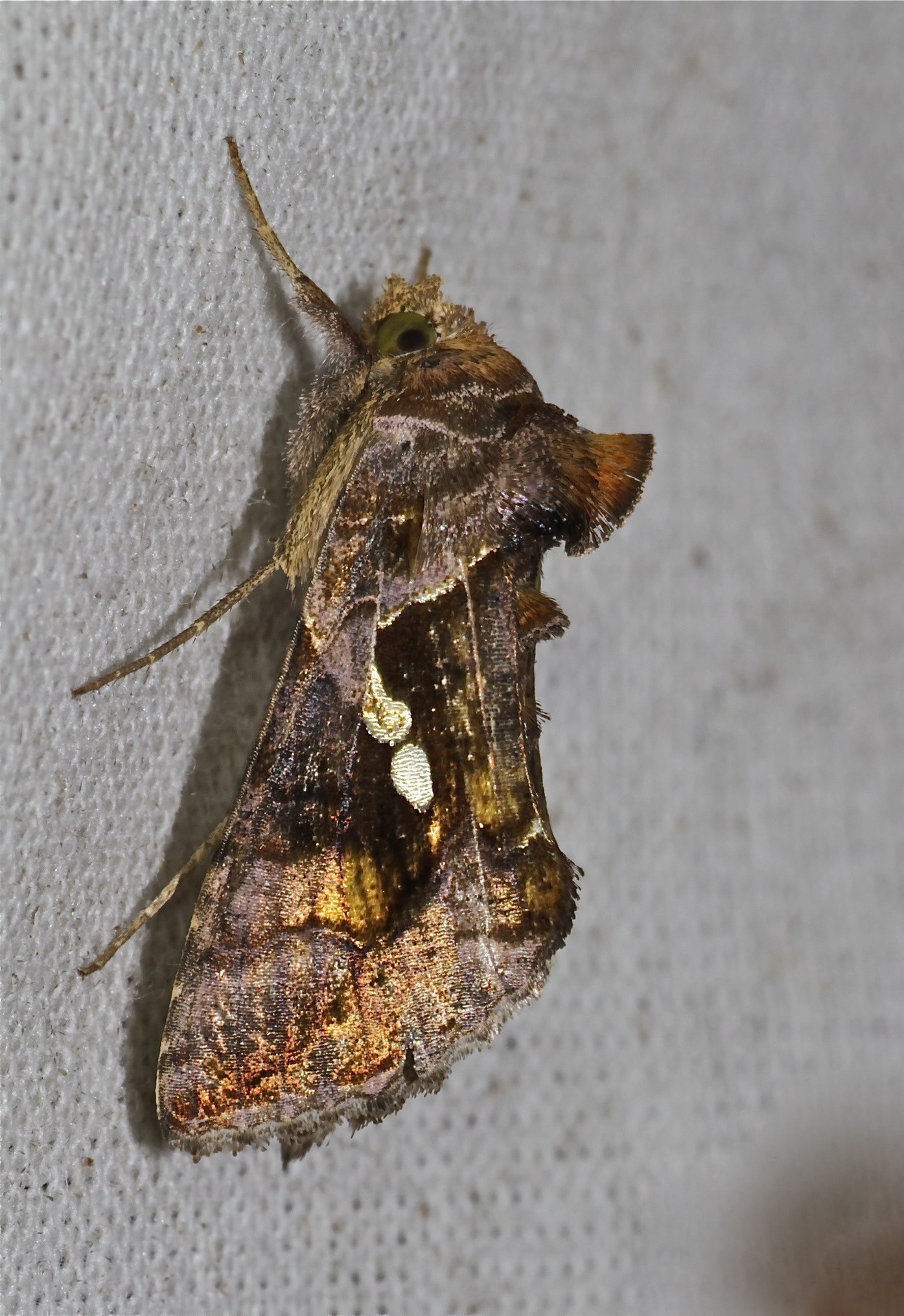

Scientific classification
- Kingdom: Animalia
- Phylum: Arthropoda
- Clade: Pancrustacea
- Class: Insecta
- Order: Lepidoptera
- Superfamily: Noctuoidea
- Family: Noctuidae
- Genus: Chrysodeixis
- Species: C. acuta

Binomial name
- Chrysodeixis acuta (Walker, 1858)

Synonyms
- Plusia acuta; Neoplusia furihatai; Shensiplusia nigribursa

= Chrysodeixis acuta =

Tunbridge Wells gem

Species of moth

Chrysodeixis acuta, the Tunbridge Wells gem, is a moth of the family Noctuidae. It is found in Africa as well as the on Canary Islands eastwards to Australasia Indonesia and Oceania.

The wingspan is 35–45 mm.

The larvae feed on various plants, including barley, linseed and sorghum.
