= Chrysodeixis chrysopepla =

Scientific classification
- Domain: Eukaryota
- Kingdom: Animalia
- Phylum: Arthropoda
- Class: Insecta
- Order: Lepidoptera
- Superfamily: Noctuoidea
- Family: Noctuidae
- Genus: Chrysodeixis
- Species: C. chrysopepla

Binomial name
- Chrysodeixis chrysopepla Ronkay, 1989

Species of moth

Chrysodeixis chrysopepla is a moth of the family Noctuidae.
