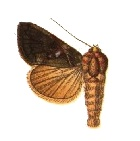

Scientific classification
- Domain: Eukaryota
- Kingdom: Animalia
- Phylum: Arthropoda
- Class: Insecta
- Order: Lepidoptera
- Superfamily: Noctuoidea
- Family: Noctuidae
- Genus: Argyrogramma
- Species: A. verruca

Binomial name
- Argyrogramma verruca (Fabricius, 1794)

Synonyms
- Noctua verruca; Autographa omicron; Argyrogramma omega; Plusia rutila

= Argyrogramma verruca =

Golden looper

Species of moth

Argyrogramma verruca (golden looper) is a moth of the family Noctuidae. It is found from Maine to Florida to Texas, Kentucky, Arizona, Kansas, Southern Michigan, Pennsylvania, Ohio, Southern Ontario, the Antilles, Central America to Brazil to Northern Argentina and Paraguay.

The wingspan is about 28 mm.
