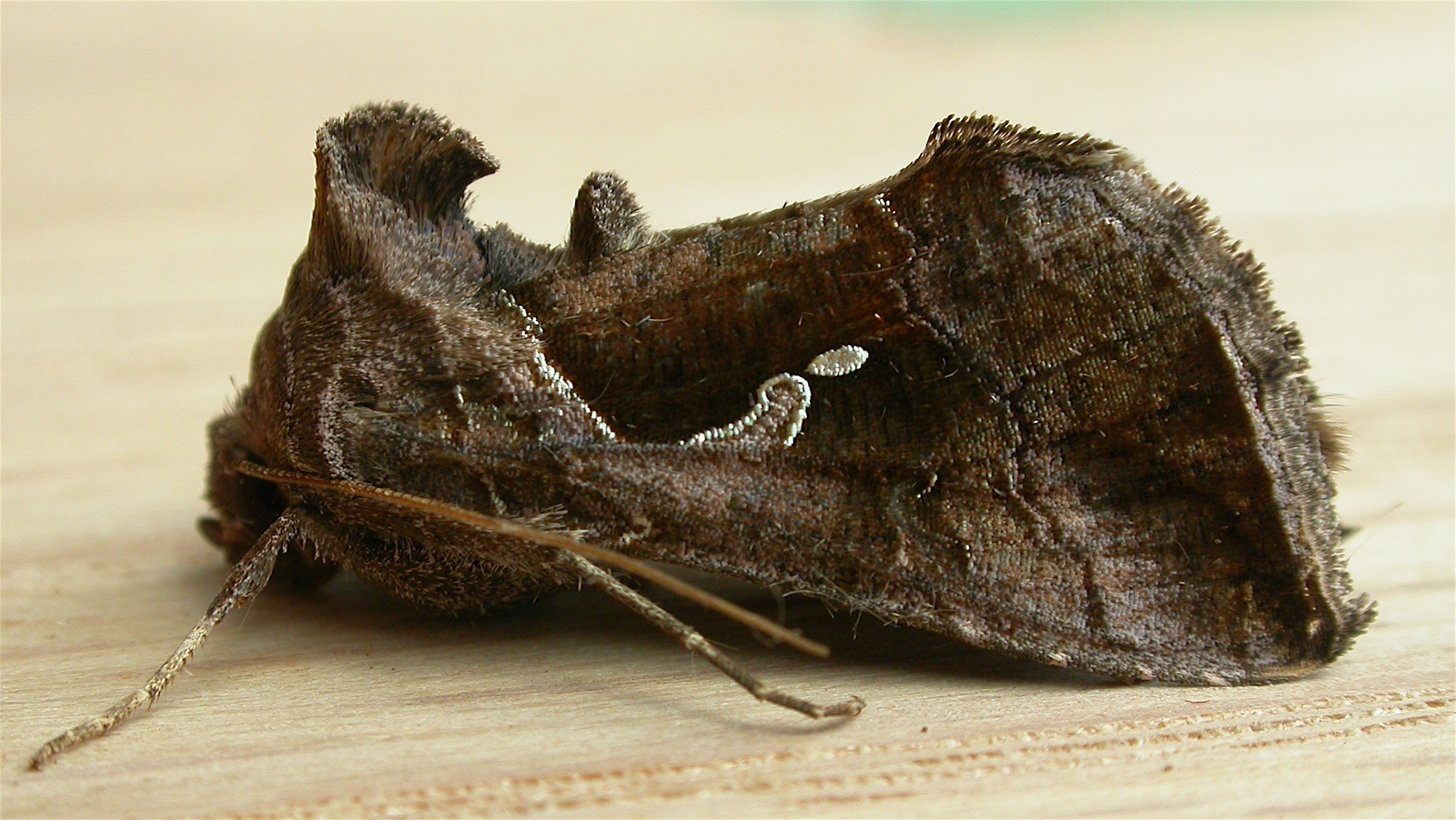

Scientific classification
- Kingdom: Animalia
- Phylum: Arthropoda
- Class: Insecta
- Order: Lepidoptera
- Superfamily: Noctuoidea
- Family: Noctuidae
- Genus: Chrysodeixis
- Species: C. subsidens

Binomial name
- Chrysodeixis subsidens Walker, 1858

Synonyms
- Phytometra subsidens; Plusia subsidens Walker, 1858; Phytometra pseudochalcytes Hampson, 1913; Chrysodeixis assidens Ronkay, 1986

= Chrysodeixis subsidens =

Australian cabbage looper

Species of moth

Chrysodeixis subsidens, the Australian cabbage looper, is a moth of the family Noctuidae. It is found in Australia.

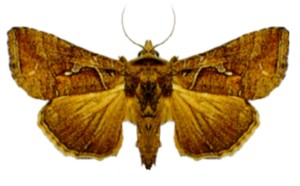
Mounted

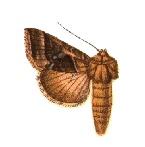
Illustration

The wingspan is ca. 30 mm.

The larvae feed on various plants, including cabbage and other brassicas, tomato and other Solanaceae, and silver beet.
