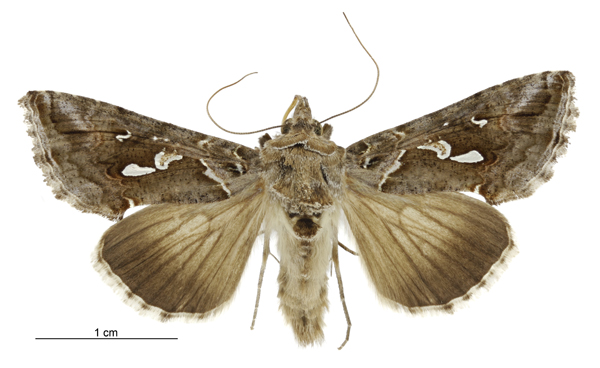
- Female
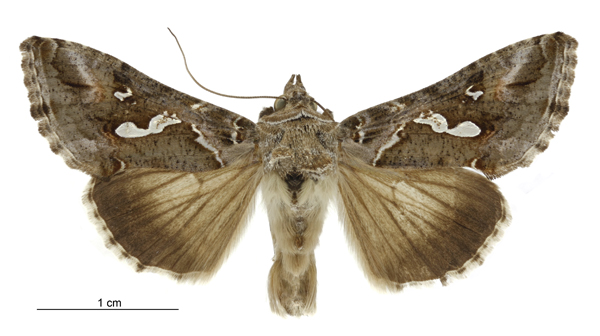
- Male

Scientific classification
- Kingdom: Animalia
- Phylum: Arthropoda
- Clade: Pancrustacea
- Class: Insecta
- Order: Lepidoptera
- Superfamily: Noctuoidea
- Family: Noctuidae
- Genus: Chrysodeixis
- Species: C. argentifera

Binomial name
- Chrysodeixis argentifera (Guenée, 1852)

Synonyms
- Plusia argentifera Guenée, 1852; Plusia secundaria Walker, [1858]; Phytometra argentifera (Guenée, 1852)

= Chrysodeixis argentifera =

Tobacco looper

Species of moth

Chrysodeixis argentifera, the tobacco looper, is a moth of the family Noctuidae. It is found in Australia and New Zealand.

== Taxonomy ==
This species was first described by Achille Guenée in 1852 and originally named Plusia argentifera.

== Description ==
The wingspan is c. 30 mm.

== Distribution ==
This species can be found in Australia and is regarded as a regular visitor that periodically establishes itself in New Zealand.

== Hosts and habitat ==
The larvae feed on various plants, including sunflower, canola, tomato, various beans and silver beet.
