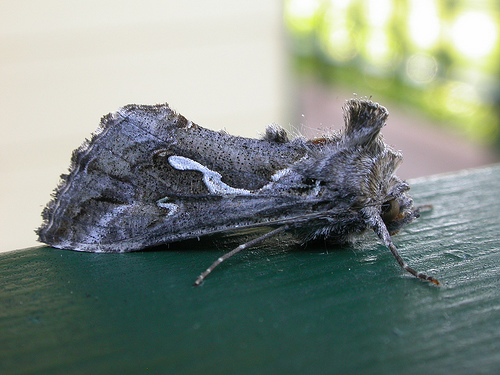
- Chrysodeixis argentifera

Scientific classification
- Kingdom: Animalia
- Phylum: Arthropoda
- Clade: Pancrustacea
- Class: Insecta
- Order: Lepidoptera
- Superfamily: Noctuoidea
- Family: Noctuidae
- Tribe: Argyrogrammatini
- Genus: Chrysodeixis; Hübner, 1821

Synonyms
- Pseudoplusia; Neoplusia; Shensiplusia; Chrysodeicis; Chrysodixis

= Chrysodeixis =

Genus of moths

Chrysodeixis is a genus of moths of the family Noctuidae described by Jacob Hübner in 1821. The type species of this genus is Phalaena chlacites.

== Species ==
- Chrysodeixis acuta (Walker, [1858]) - Tunbridge Wells gem
- Chrysodeixis argentifera (Guenée, 1852) - tobacco looper
- Chrysodeixis celebensis Dufay, 1974
- Chrysodeixis chalcites (Esper, 1789) - tomato looper
- Chrysodeixis chrysopepla Ronkay, 1989
- Chrysodeixis dalei (E. Wollaston, 1879)
- Chrysodeixis diehli Dufay, 1982
- Chrysodeixis dinawa (Bethune-Baker, 1906)
- Chrysodeixis eriosoma (Doubleday, 1843) - green garden looper
- Chrysodeixis goergneri Behounek & Ronkay, 1999
- Chrysodeixis heberachis (Strand, 1920)
- Chrysodeixis illuminata (Robinson, 1968)
- Chrysodeixis imitans Behounek & Ronkay, 1999
- Chrysodeixis includens (Walker, [1858]) - soybean looper
- Chrysodeixis kebea (Bethune-Baker, 1906)
- Chrysodeixis kebeana (Bethune-Baker, 1906)
- Chrysodeixis keili Behounek & Ronkay, 1999
- Chrysodeixis luzonensis (Wileman & West, 1929)
- Chrysodeixis maccoyi Holloway, 1977
- Chrysodeixis minutoides Holloway, 1985
- Chrysodeixis minutus Dufay, 1970
- Chrysodeixis papuasiae Dufay, 1970
- Chrysodeixis permissa (Walker, 1858)
- Chrysodeixis plesiostes Dufay, 1982
- Chrysodeixis politus Dufay, 1970
- Chrysodeixis similaris Behounek & Ronkay, 1999
- Chrysodeixis similis Behounek & Ronkay, 1999
- Chrysodeixis subsidens (Walker, 1858) - Australian cabbage looper
- Chrysodeixis taiwani Dufay, 1974
