= Zonoplusia =

Scientific classification
- Kingdom: Animalia
- Phylum: Arthropoda
- Clade: Pancrustacea
- Class: Insecta
- Order: Lepidoptera
- Superfamily: Noctuoidea
- Family: Noctuidae
- Tribe: Argyrogrammatini
- Genus: Zonoplusia; Chou & Lu, 1979

Genus of moths

Zonoplusia is a genus of moths of the family Noctuidae.

== Species ==
- Zonoplusia ochreata Walker, 1865
