= Anaplusia pannosa =

Scientific classification
- Kingdom: Animalia
- Phylum: Arthropoda
- Class: Insecta
- Order: Lepidoptera
- Superfamily: Noctuoidea
- Family: Noctuidae
- Genus: Anaplusia
- Species: A. pannosa

Binomial name
- Anaplusia pannosa Moore, 1882

Synonyms
- Plusia pannosa

Species of moth

Anaplusia pannosa is a moth of the family Noctuidae. It is found in India, including Sikkim, West Bengal, Darjiling and the Khasia Hills.
