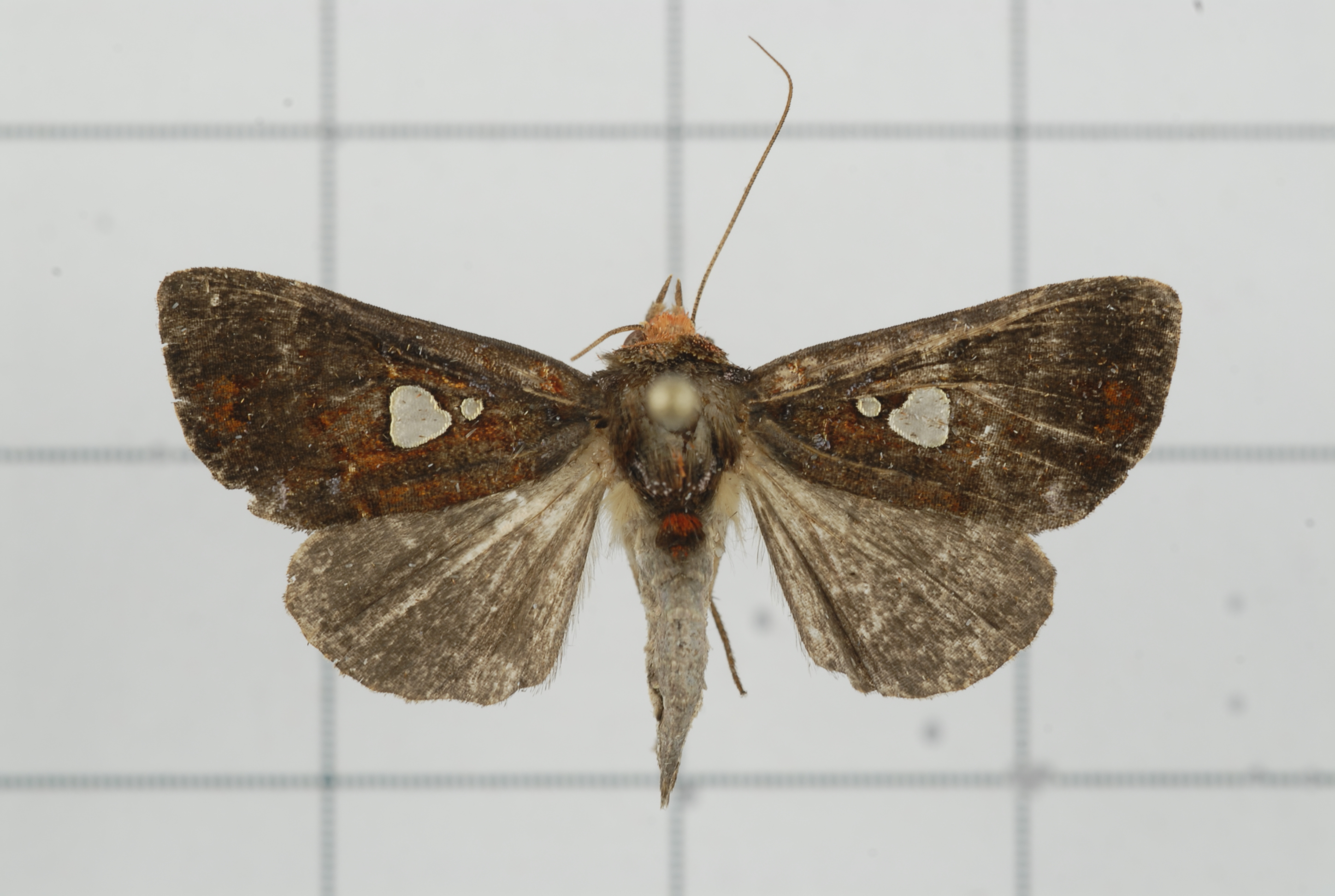
- Extremoplusia megaloba

Scientific classification
- Kingdom: Animalia
- Phylum: Arthropoda
- Class: Insecta
- Order: Lepidoptera
- Superfamily: Noctuoidea
- Family: Noctuidae
- Tribe: Argyrogrammatini
- Genus: Extremoplusia; Ronkay, 1987

= Extremoplusia =

Genus of moths

Extremoplusia is a genus of moths of the family Noctuidae.

== Species ==
- Extremoplusia megaloba Hampson, 1912
