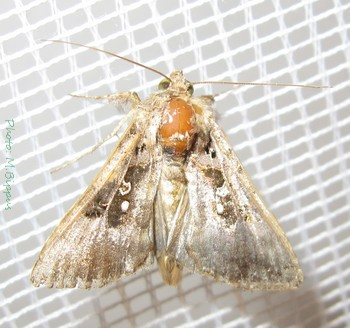

Scientific classification
- Kingdom: Animalia
- Phylum: Arthropoda
- Clade: Pancrustacea
- Class: Insecta
- Order: Lepidoptera
- Superfamily: Noctuoidea
- Family: Noctuidae
- Tribe: Argyrogrammatini
- Genus: Argyrogramma; Hübner, 1823

= Argyrogramma =

Genus of moths

Argyrogramma is a genus of moths of the family Noctuidae.

== Species ==
- Argyrogramma signata Fabricius, 1794
- Argyrogramma subaurea Dufay, 1972
- Argyrogramma verruca Fabricius, 1794
