= Scriptoplusia rubiflabellata =

Scientific classification
- Kingdom: Animalia
- Phylum: Arthropoda
- Clade: Pancrustacea
- Class: Insecta
- Order: Lepidoptera
- Superfamily: Noctuoidea
- Family: Noctuidae
- Genus: Scriptoplusia
- Species: S. rubiflabellata

Binomial name
- Scriptoplusia rubiflabellata (A.E. Prout, 1921)

Synonyms
- Plusia rubiflabellata A. E. Prout, 1921; Plusia didymospila Turner, 1933

Species of moth

Scriptoplusia rubiflabellata is a moth of the family Noctuidae. It is found in Goodenough Island, New Guinea and Queensland.
