= Plusiotricha =

Scientific classification
- Domain: Eukaryota
- Kingdom: Animalia
- Phylum: Arthropoda
- Class: Insecta
- Order: Lepidoptera
- Superfamily: Noctuoidea
- Family: Noctuidae
- Tribe: Argyrogrammatini
- Genus: Plusiotricha; Holland, 1894

Genus of moths

Plusiotricha is a genus of moths of the family Noctuidae.

== Species ==
- Plusiotricha carcassoni Dufay, 1972
- Plusiotricha fletcheri Dufay, 1972
- Plusiotricha gorilla Holland, 1894
- Plusiotricha livida Holland, 1894
- Plusiotricha pratti Kenrick, 1917
