= Chrysodeixis permissa =

Scientific classification
- Kingdom: Animalia
- Phylum: Arthropoda
- Class: Insecta
- Order: Lepidoptera
- Superfamily: Noctuoidea
- Family: Noctuidae
- Genus: Chrysodeixis
- Species: C. permissa

Binomial name
- Chrysodeixis permissa (Walker, 1858)

Synonyms
- Plusia permissa Walker, 1858

Species of moth

Chrysodeixis permissa is a moth of the family Noctuidae first described by Francis Walker in 1858. It is found in India, Sri Lanka, and the Maldives.
