= Scriptoplusia =

Scientific classification
- Domain: Eukaryota
- Kingdom: Animalia
- Phylum: Arthropoda
- Class: Insecta
- Order: Lepidoptera
- Superfamily: Noctuoidea
- Family: Noctuidae
- Tribe: Argyrogrammatini
- Genus: Scriptoplusia; Ronkay, 1987

Genus of moths

Scriptoplusia is a genus of moths of the family Noctuidae.

== Species ==
- Scriptoplusia nigriluna Walker, [1858]
- Scriptoplusia noona Ronkay, 1987
- Scriptoplusia pulchristigma Behounek & Ronkay, 1994
- Scriptoplusia rubiflabellata (Prout, 1921)
