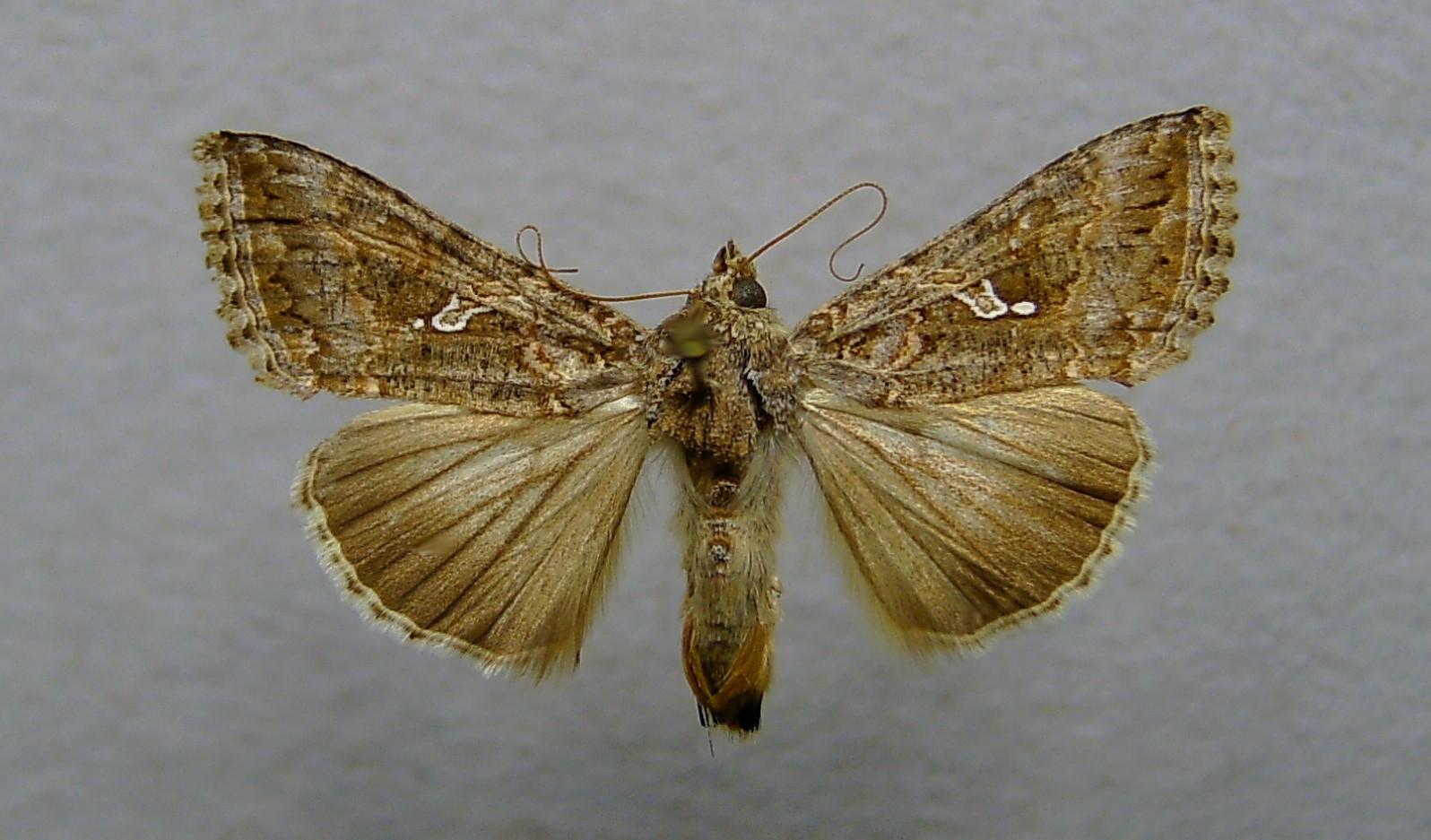
- Trichoplusia ni

Scientific classification
- Domain: Eukaryota
- Kingdom: Animalia
- Phylum: Arthropoda
- Class: Insecta
- Order: Lepidoptera
- Superfamily: Noctuoidea
- Family: Noctuidae
- Subfamily: Plusiinae
- Tribe: Argyrogrammatini; Eichlin & Cunningham, 1978

Genera
- Agrapha Hübner, 1821; Plusiotricha Holland, 1894; Trichoplusia McDunnough, 1944; Thysanoplusia Ichinose, 1973; Dactyloplusia Chou & Lu, 1979; Ctenoplusia Dufay, 1970; Stigmoplusia Dufay, 1970; Plusiopalpa Holland, 1894; Argyrogramma Hübner, 1823; Enigmogramma Lafontaine & Poole, 1991; Zonoplusia Chou & Liu, 1979; Chrysodeixis Hübner, 1821; Extremoplusia Ronkay, 1987; Scriptoplusia Ronkay, 1987; Anaplusia Ronkay, 1987; Anadevidia Kostrowicki, 1961

= Argyrogrammatini =

Tribe of moths

The Argyrogrammatini are a tribe of moths in the subfamily Plusiinae, consisting of fifteen genera.
