= Chrysodeixis dinawa =

Scientific classification
- Kingdom: Animalia
- Phylum: Arthropoda
- Clade: Pancrustacea
- Class: Insecta
- Order: Lepidoptera
- Superfamily: Noctuoidea
- Family: Noctuidae
- Genus: Chrysodeixis
- Species: C. dinawa

Binomial name
- Chrysodeixis dinawa Bethune-Baker, 1906

Synonyms
- Plusia dinawa

Species of moth

Chrysodeixis dinawa is a moth of the family Noctuidae. It is found in New Guinea.
