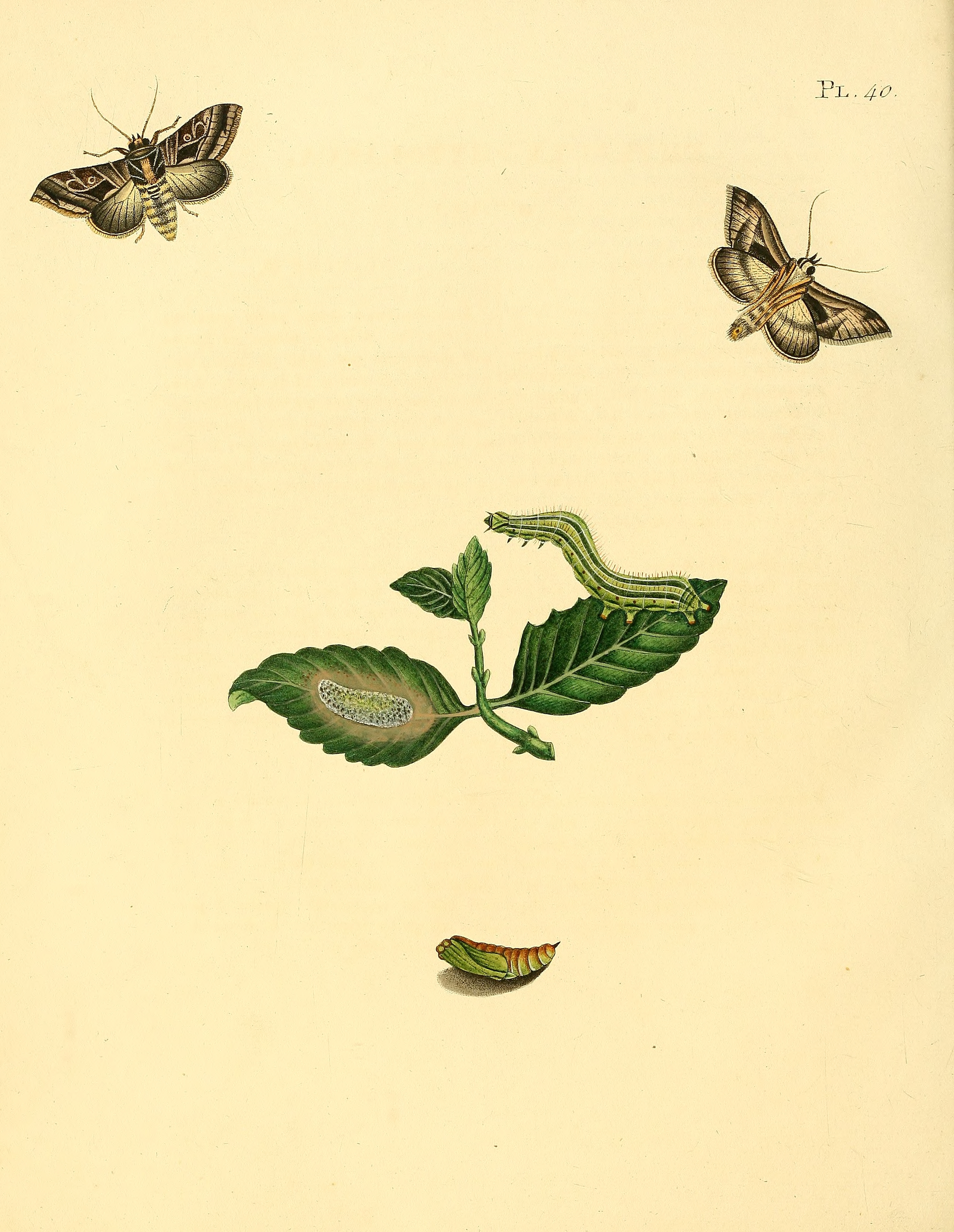
- Enigmogramma phytolacca

Scientific classification
- Domain: Eukaryota
- Kingdom: Animalia
- Phylum: Arthropoda
- Class: Insecta
- Order: Lepidoptera
- Superfamily: Noctuoidea
- Family: Noctuidae
- Tribe: Argyrogrammatini
- Genus: Enigmogramma; Lafontaine & Poole, 1991

= Enigmogramma =

Genus of moths

Enigmogramma is a genus of moths of the family Noctuidae.

== Species ==
- Enigmogramma admonens Walker, [1858]
- Enigmogramma antillea Becker, 2001
- Enigmogramma basigera Walker, 1865
- Enigmogramma feisthamelii Guenée, 1852
- Enigmogramma limata Schaus, 1911
- Enigmogramma phytolacca Sepp, [1848]
