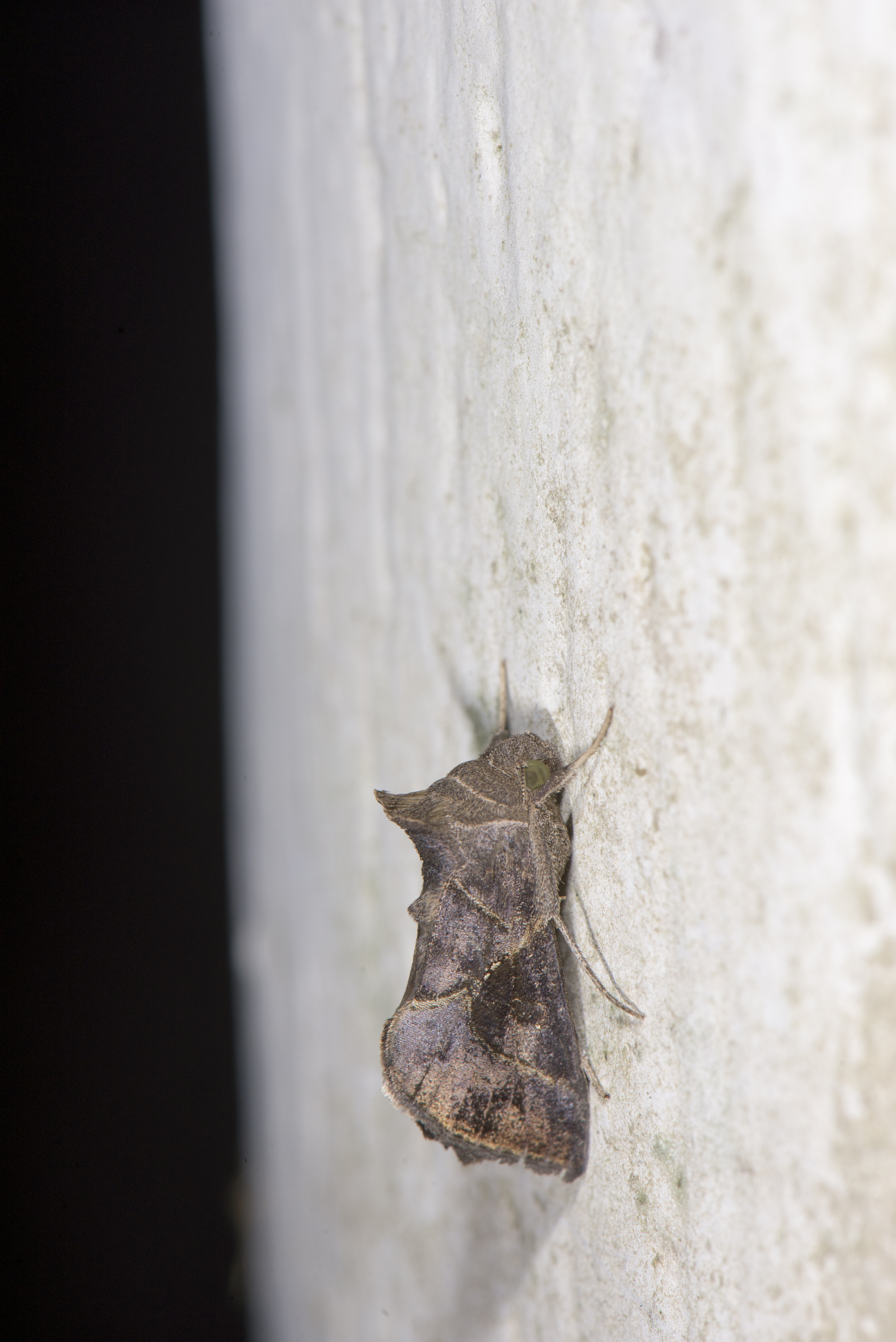

Scientific classification
- Kingdom: Animalia
- Phylum: Arthropoda
- Class: Insecta
- Order: Lepidoptera
- Superfamily: Noctuoidea
- Family: Noctuidae
- Genus: Chrysodeixis
- Species: C. heberachis

Binomial name
- Chrysodeixis heberachis Strand, 1920

Synonyms
- Phytometra heberachis

= Chrysodeixis heberachis =

Species of moth

Chrysodeixis heberachis is a moth of the family Noctuidae. It is found in Taiwan, Ishigaki Island (Japan) and Kuala Lumpur (Malaysia) possibly due to migration or accidental transfer

These insects are considered as pests due to the insects feeding on crops. Although they feed on crops, they do play a role in pollination as they do feed on nectar causing pollen to stick on them. But the insect doesn't play a big role in pollination.
