= Anadevidia =

Scientific classification
- Domain: Eukaryota
- Kingdom: Animalia
- Phylum: Arthropoda
- Class: Insecta
- Order: Lepidoptera
- Superfamily: Noctuoidea
- Family: Noctuidae
- Tribe: Argyrogrammatini
- Genus: Anadevidia; Kostrowicki, 1961

Genus of moths

Anadevidia is a genus of moths of the family Noctuidae.

== Species ==
- Anadevidia hebetata (Butler, 1889)
- Anadevidia peponis (Fabricius, 1775)
