= Chrysodeixis diehli =

Scientific classification
- Domain: Eukaryota
- Kingdom: Animalia
- Phylum: Arthropoda
- Class: Insecta
- Order: Lepidoptera
- Superfamily: Noctuoidea
- Family: Noctuidae
- Genus: Chrysodeixis
- Species: C. diehli

Binomial name
- Chrysodeixis diehli Dufay, 1982

Species of moth

Chrysodeixis diehli is a moth of the family Noctuidae. It is found throughout Sundaland.
