= Stigmoplusia =

Scientific classification
- Domain: Eukaryota
- Kingdom: Animalia
- Phylum: Arthropoda
- Class: Insecta
- Order: Lepidoptera
- Superfamily: Noctuoidea
- Family: Noctuidae
- Tribe: Argyrogrammatini
- Genus: Stigmoplusia; Dufay, 1970

Genus of moths

Stigmoplusia is a genus of moths of the family Noctuidae.

== Species ==
- Stigmoplusia acalypta Dufay, 1972
- Stigmoplusia allocota Dufay, 1972
- Stigmoplusia antsalova Dufay, 1968
- Stigmoplusia chalcoides Dufay, 1968
- Stigmoplusia epistilba Dufay, 1972
- Stigmoplusia megista Dufay, 1975
- Stigmoplusia paraplesia Dufay, 1972
