= Anadevidia hebetata =

Scientific classification
- Kingdom: Animalia
- Phylum: Arthropoda
- Class: Insecta
- Order: Lepidoptera
- Superfamily: Noctuoidea
- Family: Noctuidae
- Genus: Anadevidia
- Species: A. hebetata

Binomial name
- Anadevidia hebetata Butler, 1889

Synonyms
- Plusia hebetata

Species of moth

Anadevidia hebetata is a moth of the family Noctuidae. It is found in Asia, including Japan and India.

The wingspan is 38–45 mm.

The species is commonly found in forested and rural areas where suitable host plants for its larvae are available.
