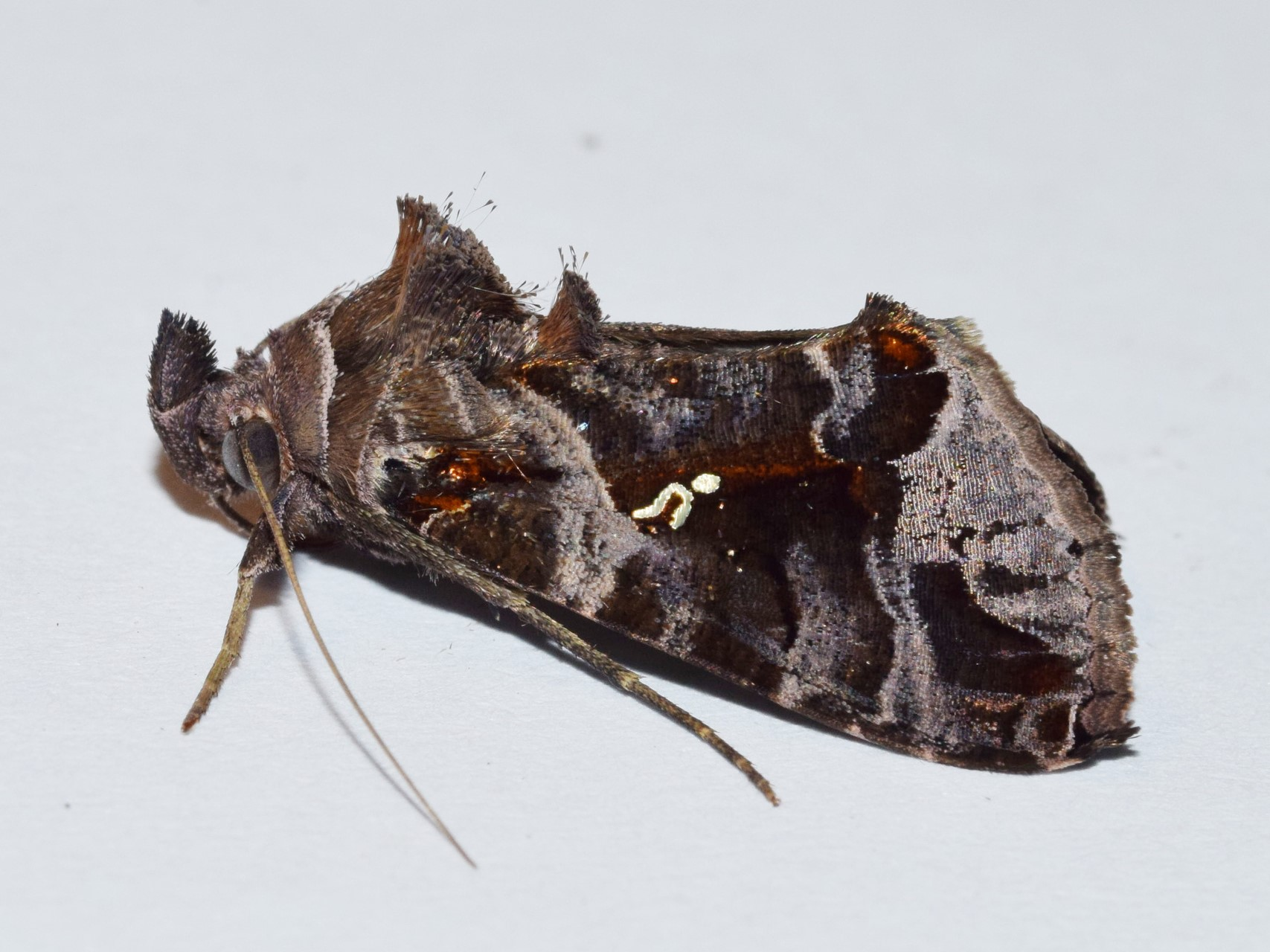
- Plusiopalpa dichora

Scientific classification
- Kingdom: Animalia
- Phylum: Arthropoda
- Clade: Pancrustacea
- Class: Insecta
- Order: Lepidoptera
- Superfamily: Noctuoidea
- Family: Noctuidae
- Tribe: Argyrogrammatini
- Genus: Plusiopalpa; Holland, 1894

= Plusiopalpa =

Genus of moths

Plusiopalpa is a genus of moths in the family Noctuidae.

== Species ==
- Plusiopalpa adrasta Felder, 1874
- Plusiopalpa dichora Holland, 1894
- Plusiopalpa hildebrandti Saalmüller, 1891
- Plusiopalpa thaumasia Dufay, 1968
