= Enigmogramma antillea =

Scientific classification
- Domain: Eukaryota
- Kingdom: Animalia
- Phylum: Arthropoda
- Class: Insecta
- Order: Lepidoptera
- Superfamily: Noctuoidea
- Family: Noctuidae
- Genus: Enigmogramma
- Species: E. antillea

Binomial name
- Enigmogramma antillea Becker, 2001

Species of moth

Enigmogramma antillea is a moth of the family Noctuidae. It is found on Cuba and Puerto Rico. A specimen was collected in Collier County, Florida, in 2012.

The length of the forewings is 14–16 mm. The forewings are brown with slight purple hue. The hindwings are gray, becoming paler towards the base.
