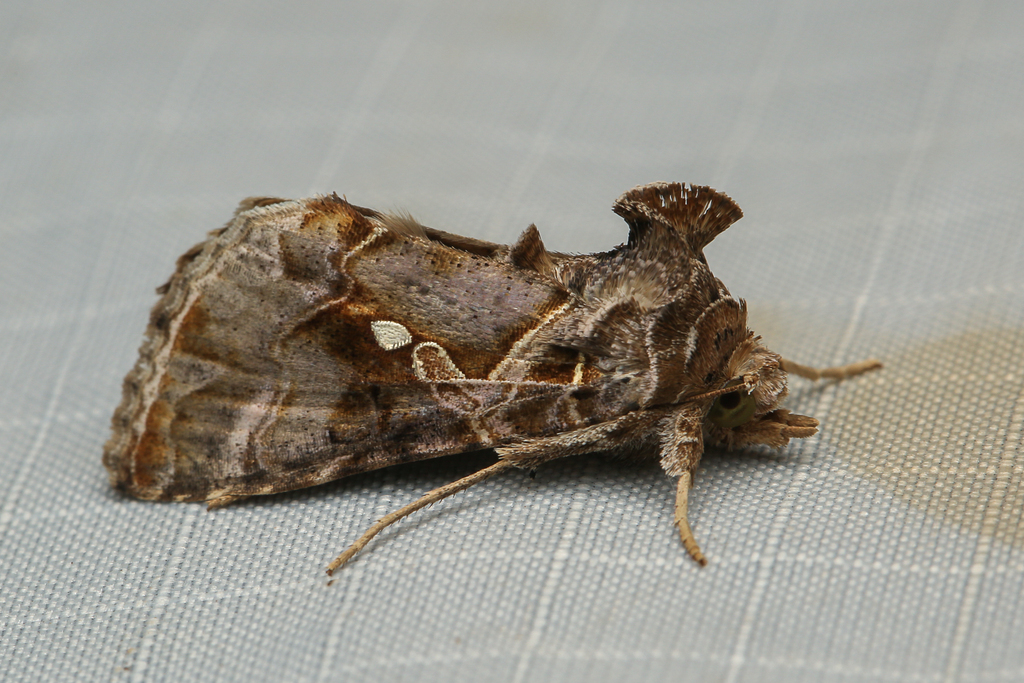

Scientific classification
- Kingdom: Animalia
- Phylum: Arthropoda
- Class: Insecta
- Order: Lepidoptera
- Superfamily: Noctuoidea
- Family: Noctuidae
- Genus: Chrysodeixis
- Species: C. illuminata

Binomial name
- Chrysodeixis illuminata (G.S. Robinson, 1968)

Synonyms
- Plusia illuminata G.S. Robinson, 1968; Phytometra illuminata Warren, 1913; Chrysodeixis nesiotes Dufay, 1974; Chrysodeixis albescens Chou & Lu, 1979

= Chrysodeixis illuminata =

Species of moth

Chrysodeixis illuminata is a moth of the family Noctuidae. It is found across south-east Asia and the southern Pacific, including Fiji, Papua New Guinea, Timor, New Caledonia, Borneo, the Cook Islands, Queensland, the Chagos Archipelago and Samoa.
