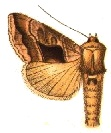

Scientific classification
- Kingdom: Animalia
- Phylum: Arthropoda
- Class: Insecta
- Order: Lepidoptera
- Superfamily: Noctuoidea
- Family: Noctuidae
- Genus: Enigmogramma
- Species: E. feisthamelii

Binomial name
- Enigmogramma feisthamelii (Guenée, 1852)

Synonyms
- Plusia feisthamelii Guenée, 1852; Trichoplusia feisthamelii; Syngrapha feisthameli

= Enigmogramma feisthamelii =

Species of moth

Enigmogramma feisthamelii is a moth of the family Noctuidae. It is found in South America, including French Guiana.
