= Chrysodeixis celebensis =

Scientific classification
- Domain: Eukaryota
- Kingdom: Animalia
- Phylum: Arthropoda
- Class: Insecta
- Order: Lepidoptera
- Superfamily: Noctuoidea
- Family: Noctuidae
- Genus: Chrysodeixis
- Species: C. celebensis

Binomial name
- Chrysodeixis celebensis Dufay, 1974

Species of moth

Chrysodeixis celebensis is a moth of the family Noctuidae. It is found on Sulawesi.
