= Neoplusia =

Scientific classification
- Kingdom: Animalia
- Phylum: Arthropoda
- Class: Insecta
- Order: Lepidoptera
- Superfamily: Noctuoidea
- Family: Noctuidae
- Subfamily: Plusiinae
- Genus: Neoplusia; Okano, 1963

Genus of moths

Neoplusia was a genus of moths of the family Noctuidae. The species in the genus have been transferred to Chrysodeixis.
