= Zonoplusia ochreata =

Scientific classification
- Kingdom: Animalia
- Phylum: Arthropoda
- Class: Insecta
- Order: Lepidoptera
- Superfamily: Noctuoidea
- Family: Noctuidae
- Genus: Zonoplusia
- Species: Z. ochreata

Binomial name
- Zonoplusia ochreata (Walker, 1865)

Synonyms
- Plusia ochreata Walker, 1865; Plusia cornucopiae Snellen, 1880; Thysanoplusia ochreata (Walker, 1865)

Species of moth

Zonoplusia ochreata a species of moth in the family Noctuidae. It was first described by Francis Walker in 1865. It is found in the Oriental tropics of India, Sri Lanka, north to Japan, east to Hong Kong, Sundaland and the Philippines. The species is also known from the Australian state of Queensland.

== Description ==
The wingspan of this moth is 24–26 mm. It has palpi with a short third joint. The hind femur of the male is not tufted with long hair. Its thorax is suffused with fiery orange. Its forewings are of a copper colour confined to the apical part of outer area. The stigma consists of a fuscous and white streak from the costa at the anteromedial line to the post medial lines at vein 2, these being almost erect and the latter sinuous.

The larvae feed on Polygonum species.
