= Enigmogramma admonens =

Scientific classification
- Kingdom: Animalia
- Phylum: Arthropoda
- Class: Insecta
- Order: Lepidoptera
- Superfamily: Noctuoidea
- Family: Noctuidae
- Genus: Enigmogramma
- Species: E. admonens

Binomial name
- Enigmogramma admonens (Walker, [1858])

Synonyms
- Plusia admonens Walker, [1858]; Plusia binotula Herrich-Schäffer, 1868; Enigmogramma binotula

Species of moth

Enigmogramma admonens is a moth of the family Noctuidae first described by Francis Walker in 1858. It is found in Brazil, Cuba and Puerto Rico.
