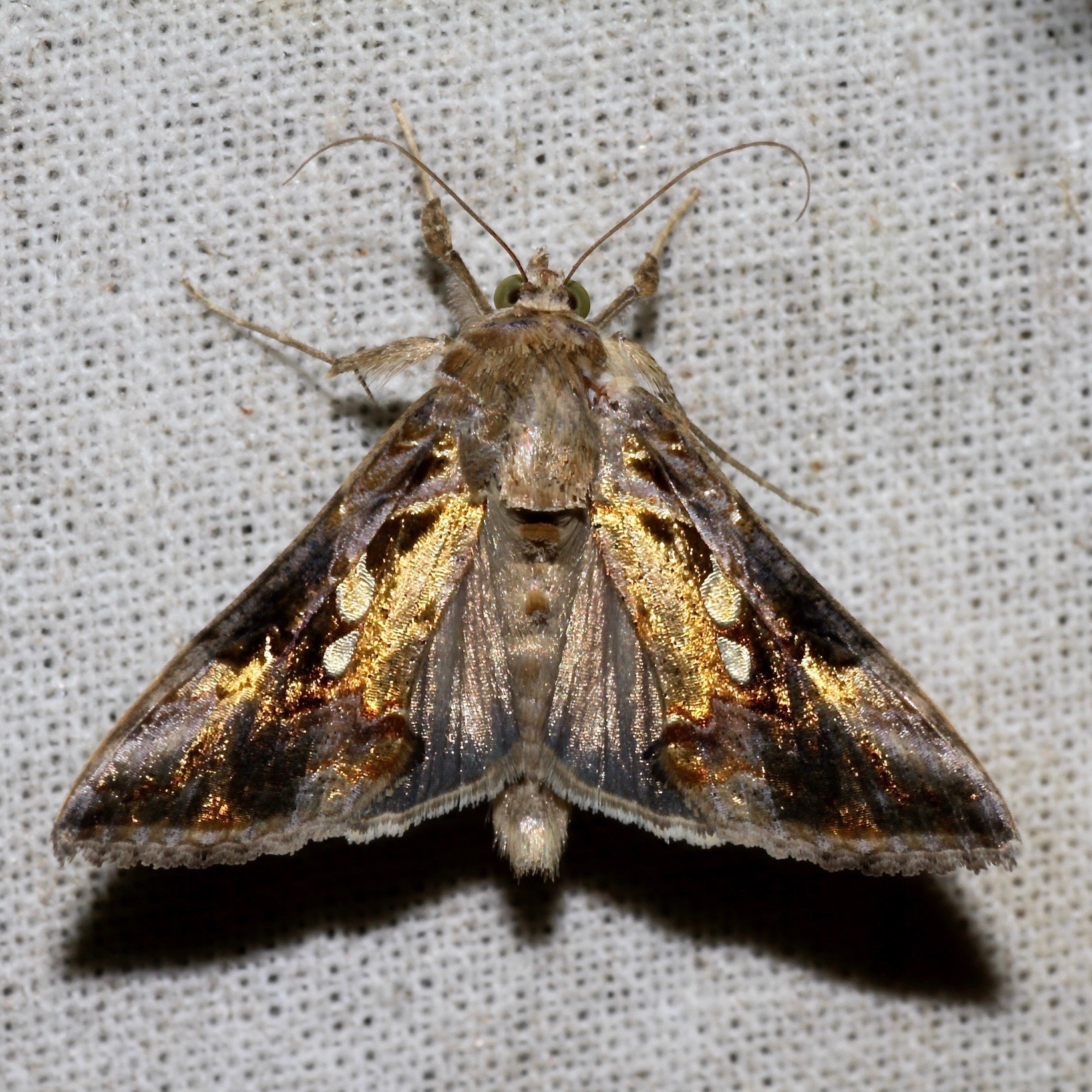
- From South Africa

Scientific classification
- Domain: Eukaryota
- Kingdom: Animalia
- Phylum: Arthropoda
- Class: Insecta
- Order: Lepidoptera
- Superfamily: Noctuoidea
- Family: Noctuidae
- Genus: Argyrogramma
- Species: A. signata

Binomial name
- Argyrogramma signata Fabricius, 1794

Synonyms
- Noctua signata; Plusia diminuta; Argyrogramma hainanensis; Plusia signata; Phytometra signata

= Argyrogramma signata =

Green semilooper

Species of moth

Argyrogramma signata, the green semilooper, is a moth of the family Noctuidae.

== Distribution ==
It is found in Africa, it is found on the Canary Islands, Egypt, Ghana, Ivory Coast, Madagascar, Mauritius, São Tomé, the Seychelles, Sierra Leone, South Africa, Tanzania, Uganda and Zambia. In Asia, it is found in Bangladesh, Myanmar, India (Andhra Pradesh, Bihar, Karnataka, Maharashtra, Sikkim, Tamil Nadu and Uttar Pradesh), Indonesia, (Java, Kalimantan, Sulawesi and Sumatra), Malaysia (Malaya and Sarawak), Pakistan, the Philippines, Sri Lanka, Taiwan, Thailand and Vietnam. Furthermore, it is found in Australia (Queensland), the Cook Islands, Fiji, New Caledonia, Papua New Guinea, the Solomon Islands, Tonga and Vanuatu.

== Description ==
The wingspan is about 25–32 mm. Palpi with short third joint. Hind femur of male not tufted with long hair. Head, thorax and forewings are pale reddish brown. Abdomen pale with dorsal tufts small. Forewings with a copper tinge. The sub-basal, antemedial and postmedial line are more prominent and less waved. There are some black specks beyond the sub-basal line. The tail of the "Y-mark" detached from the arms. The patch and black specks on outer margin absent. Hindwings nearly uniform pale of dark fuscous.

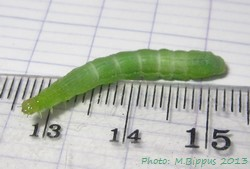
Caterpillar

The larvae feed on Cruciferae species, legumes, tobacco, Eleusine coracana, Eucalyptus, eggplant, sunflower and Amaranthus species.
