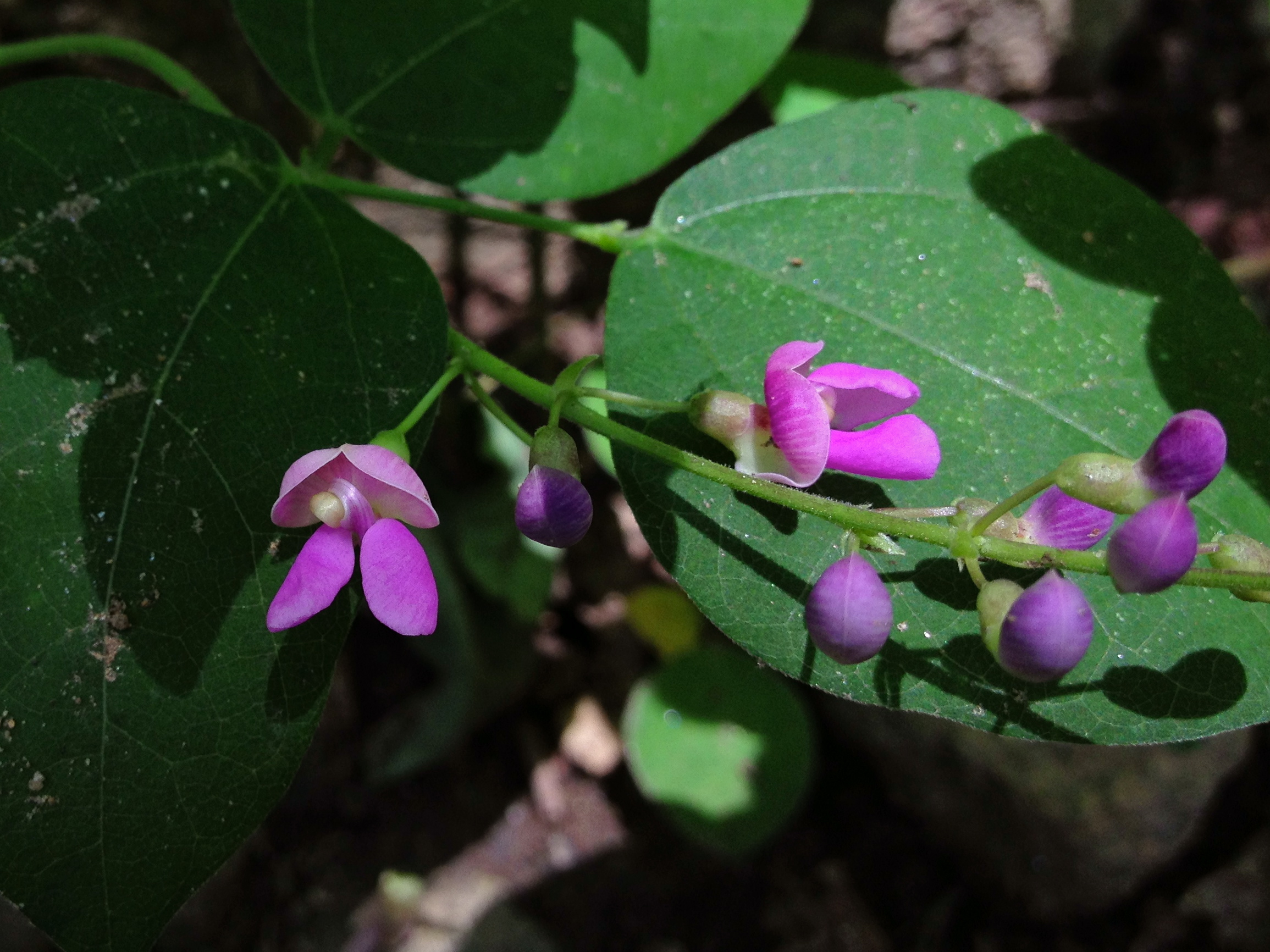

Conservation status
- Least Concern (IUCN 3.1)

Scientific classification
- Kingdom: Plantae
- Clade: Tracheophytes
- Clade: Angiosperms
- Clade: Eudicots
- Clade: Rosids
- Order: Fabales
- Family: Fabaceae
- Subfamily: Faboideae
- Genus: Phaseolus
- Species: P. polystachios

Binomial name
- Phaseolus polystachios (L.) Britton, Sterns & Poggenb.

Synonyms
- Dolichos polystachios L.; Phaseolus paniculatus Michx.; Phaseolus perennis Walter; Phaseolus polystachios var. aquilonius Fernald

= Phaseolus polystachios =

Species of legume

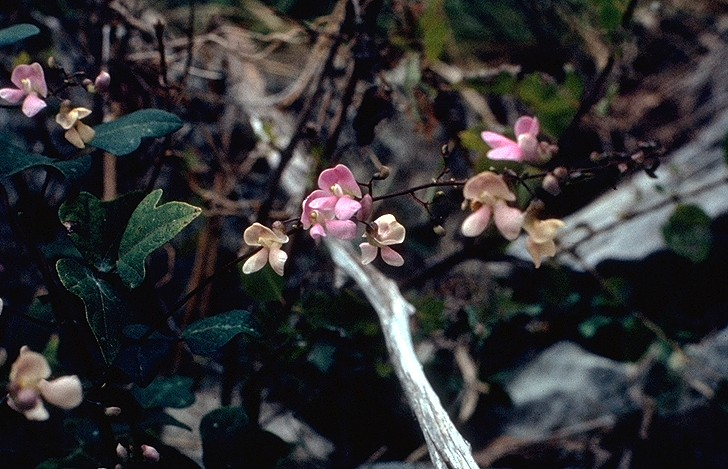
Phaseolus polystachios

Phaseolus polystachios, also known as the thicket bean or wild kidney bean, is a perennial, herbaceous vine that is native to North America. It is unique among the Phaseolus in that its native range extends across the eastern temperate United States to southeast Canada, while most Phaseolus are tropical or subtropical. It is the namesake for the Polystachios group clade, which is the most species-rich within Phaseolus (17 species). In spite of its common name, it is more closely related to the lima bean (Phaseolus lunatus), and it holds potential as a crop wild relative due to its resistance to white mold (Sclerotinia sclerotiorum).

== Subordinate taxa ==
Subordinate taxa include Phaseolus polystachios var. polystachios, Phaseolus polystachios var. sinuatus, and Phaseolus polystachios var. smilacifolius. The Phaseolus polystachios var. polystachios variety is listed as a special concern species and believed extirpated in Connecticut.

== Ethnobotany and uses ==
Phaseolus polystachios has been found in a few Native American archaeological sites in Oklahoma and Arkansas, with some evidence of artificial selection for indehiscent (non-shattering) pods. Its fruit and seeds can reportedly be eaten in much the same way as cultivated Phaseolus, although they are smaller.

== Life history ==
Phaseolus polystachios exhibits hypogeal germination and is photoperiod sensitive, requiring day lengths greater than 10 hours to vine and flower. It overwinters via a tuberous root system.

== Ecology ==
Phaseolus polystachios inhabits well-drained soils and slopes, generally woodlands and thickets, and may form colonies. Their pods are eaten extensively by weevils.
