= Anadevidia peponis =

Scientific classification
- Kingdom: Animalia
- Phylum: Arthropoda
- Clade: Pancrustacea
- Class: Insecta
- Order: Lepidoptera
- Superfamily: Noctuoidea
- Family: Noctuidae
- Genus: Anadevidia
- Species: A. peponis

Binomial name
- Anadevidia peponis (Fabricius, 1775)

Synonyms
- Plusia agramma Guenée, 1852; Plusia inchoata Walker, 1865; Plusia fumifera Graeser, (1890); Noctua peponis Fabricius, 1775

Species of moth

Anadevidia peponis is a species of moth belonging to the family Noctuidae. It is primarily found in Southeast Asia, including countries such as Japan, India, Taiwan, and the state of New South Wales in Australia. This moth is known to be a minor pest that affects various plants in the cucurbit family.

== Description ==
The wingspan is about 40 mm. Palpi with short third joint. Hind femur of male not tufted with long hair. Body greyish brown without rosy tinge. Forewings with bronze patches instead of coppery, where the postmedial line sinuous. Larva greenish with lateral black spots. There are some short black pointed spines found on the back, stoutest on the 4th to 7th and 11th somites. A prominent white sub-dorsal and lateral waved line present.

Eggs are white and spherical. The larvae feed on Cucurbitaceae species, including Citrullus lanatus, Cucumis sativus, Cucurbita moschata, Cucurbita pepo, Momordica charantia, Sechium edule and Trichosanthes cucumerina.

== Gallery ==
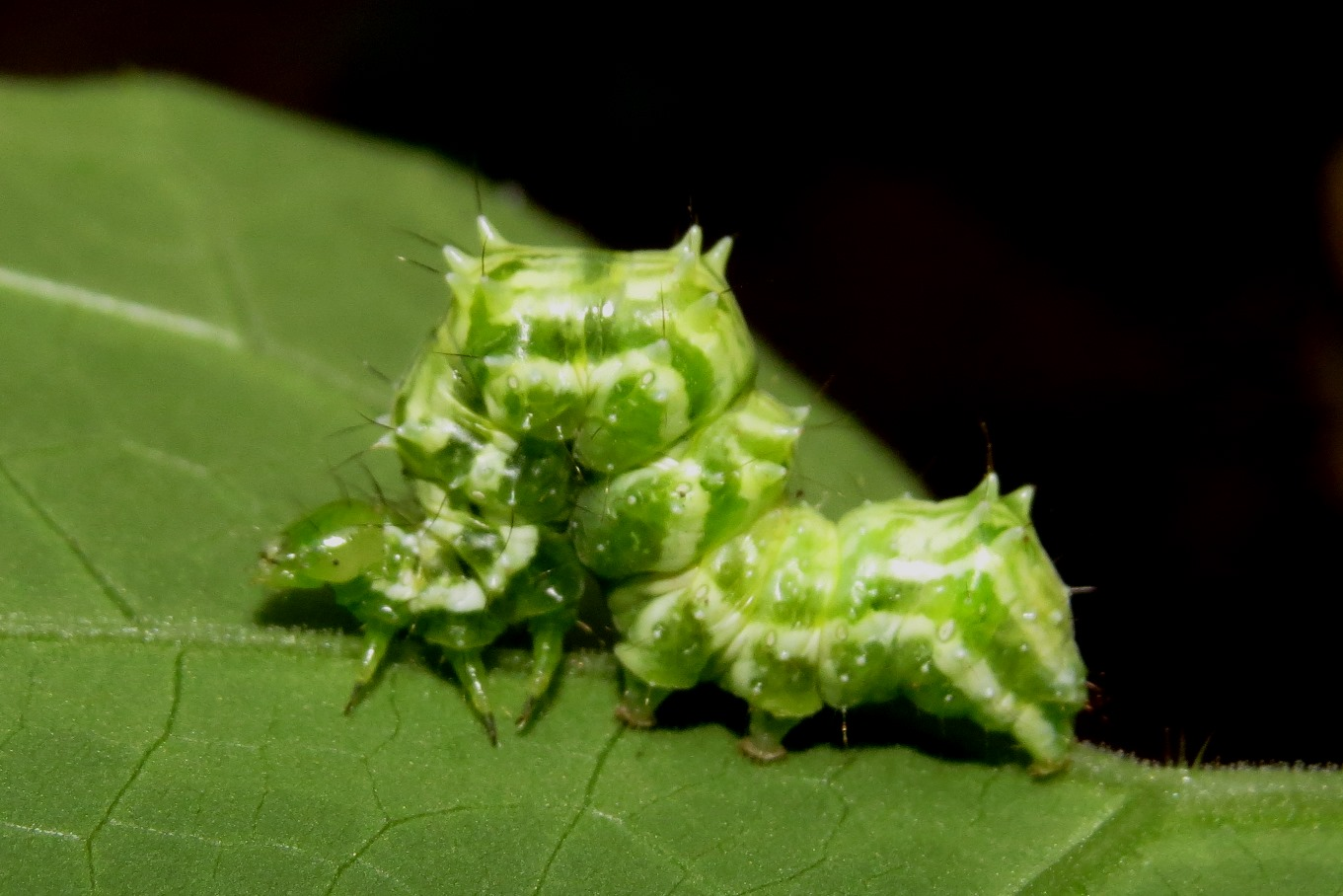
Snake gourd semilooper anadevidia peponis larvae from Tuvvur, Kerala, India
