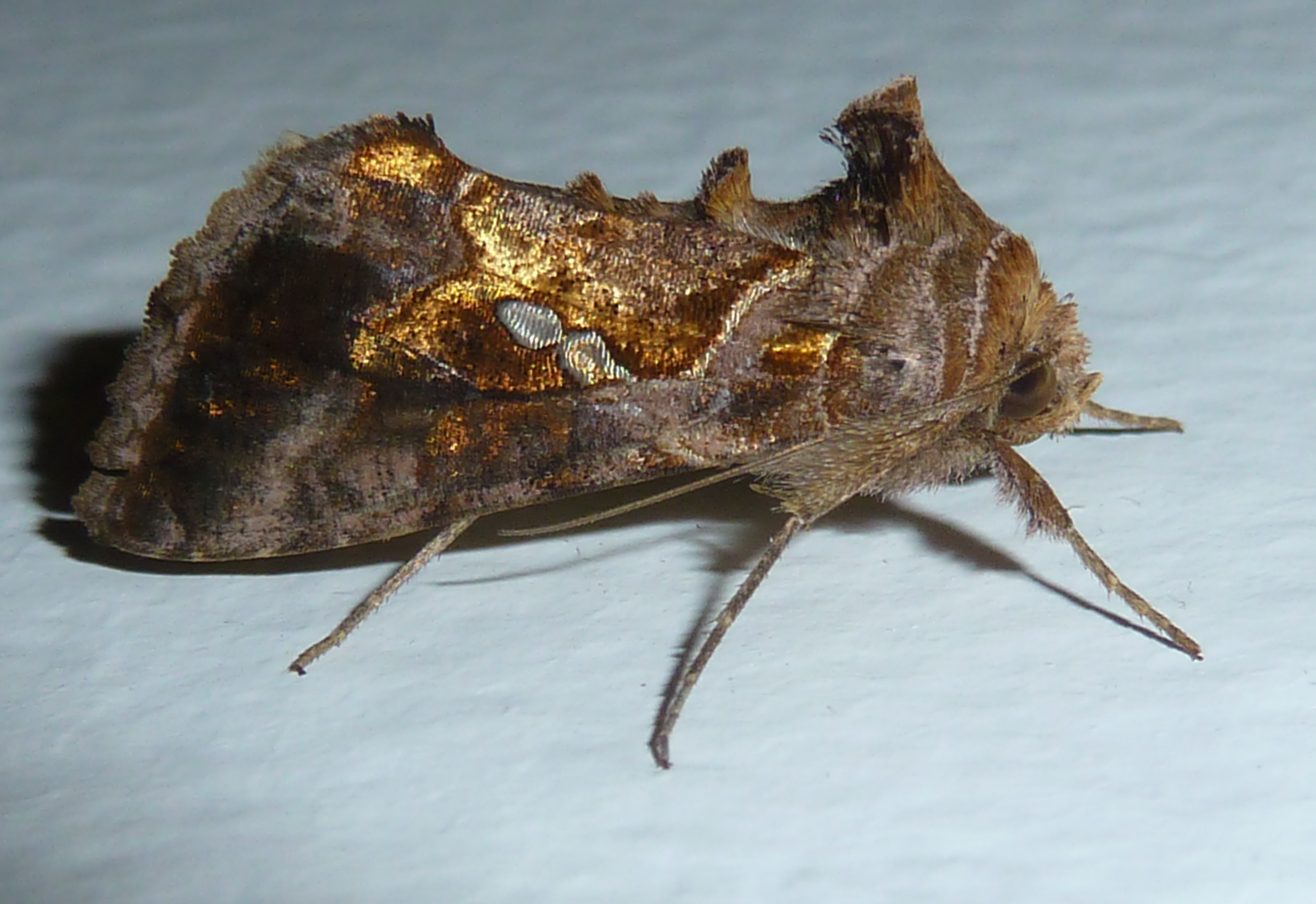

Scientific classification
- Domain: Eukaryota
- Kingdom: Animalia
- Phylum: Arthropoda
- Class: Insecta
- Order: Lepidoptera
- Superfamily: Noctuoidea
- Family: Noctuidae
- Genus: Chrysodeixis
- Species: C. chalcites

Binomial name
- Chrysodeixis chalcites (Esper, 1789)

Synonyms
- Phalaena-Noctua chalcites Esper, 1789; Plusia verticillata; Plusia chalcites; Phytometra chalcytes; Autographa chalcites

= Chrysodeixis chalcites =

Species of moth

Chrysodeixis chalcites, the tomato looper or golden twin-spot moth, is a moth of the family Noctuidae, subfamily Plusiinae. It mainly lives in southern Europe, the Levant and tropical Africa, but can be seen migrating across much of Europe. In 2013, it was spotted in Canada. It is an important horticultural pest in New Zealand.

The length of the forewings is 15–18 mm. The moth flies from June to October.

The larvae feed on various herbaceous plants, such as Echium vulgare, Apium, Rubus, tomato, Fragaria and tobacco which is why it is perceived as a pest.

Chrysodeixis chalcites and Chrysodeixis eriosoma moths cannot be separated morphologically and they may be sibling species. They are distinguished by DNA, pheromones and geographic origin, as C. chalcites is found in the palearctic and C. eriosoma in the tropics and subtropics. The literature referring to C. chalcites in southern and eastern Asia or Oceania may actually refer to C. eriosoma.

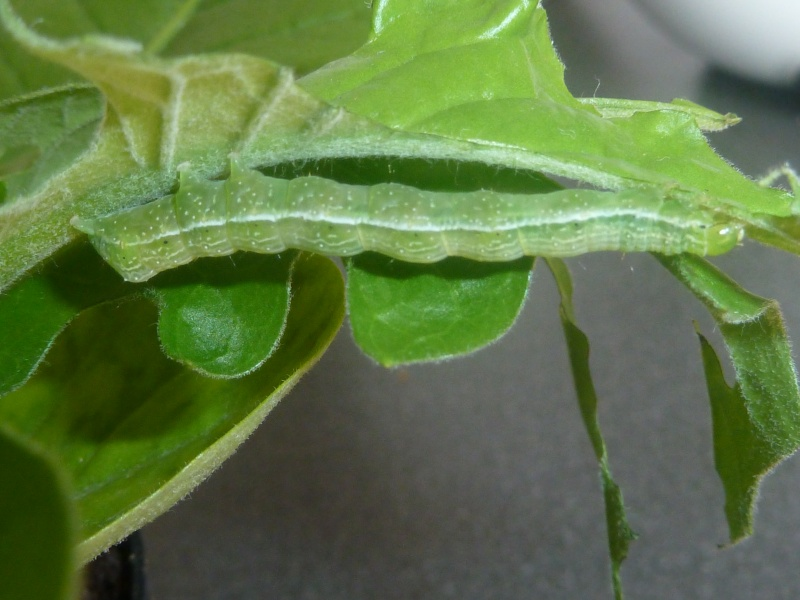
Larva

== Notes ==
1. The flight season refers to The Netherlands. This may vary in other parts of the range.
