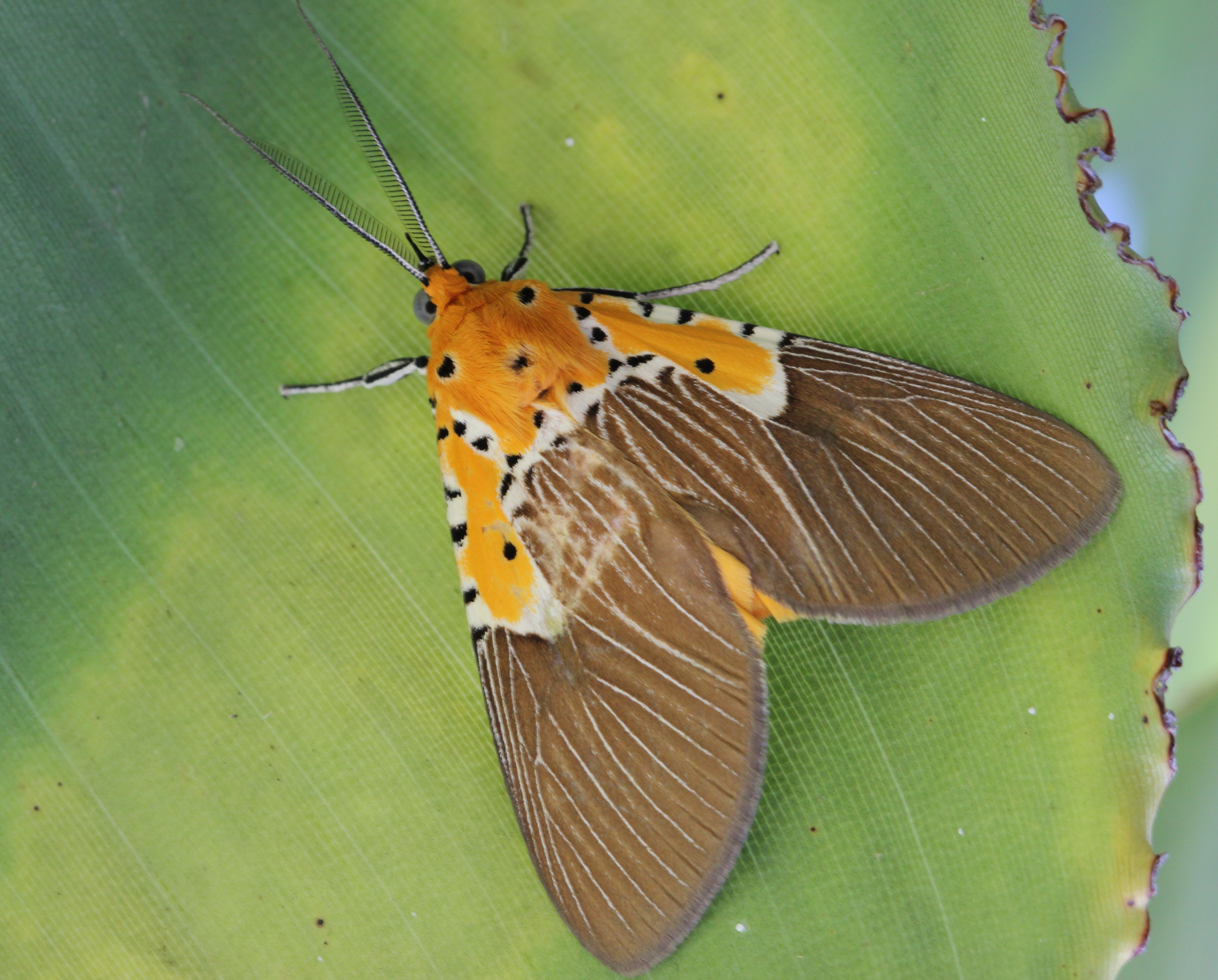
- Asota speciosa, a moth in the subfamily Aganainae, photographed in South Africa

Scientific classification
- Domain: Eukaryota
- Kingdom: Animalia
- Phylum: Arthropoda
- Class: Insecta
- Order: Lepidoptera
- Superfamily: Noctuoidea
- Family: Erebidae
- Subfamily: Aganainae; Lafontaine & Fibiger, 2006

= Aganainae =

Subfamily of moths

The Aganainae are a small subfamily of moths in the family Erebidae. The adults and caterpillars of this subfamily are typically large and brightly colored, like the related tiger moths. Many of the caterpillars feed on poisonous host plants and acquire toxic cardenolides that make them unpleasant to predators. Like the closely related litter moths, the adults have long, upturned labial palps, and the caterpillars have fully or mostly developed prolegs on the abdomen. The Aganainae are distributed across the tropics and subtropics of the Old World.

== Taxonomy ==
The subfamily was formerly placed in the families Noctuidae and Arctiidae by some authors. Other authors ranked it as a family by the names Aganaidae or Hypsidae. Recent phylogenetic studies have shown that the Aganainae are most closely related to the Herminiinae (litter moths), and this pair of subfamilies is most closely related to the Arctiinae (tiger and lichen moths), all within the family Erebidae.

== Genera ==
- Agape Felder, 1874
- Asota Hübner, 1819
- Digama Moore, 1860
- Euplocia Hübner, 1819
- Neochera Hübner, 1819
- Peridrome Walker, 1854
- Phaegorista Boisduval, 1836
- Soloe Walker, 1854
- Soloella Gaede, 1926
