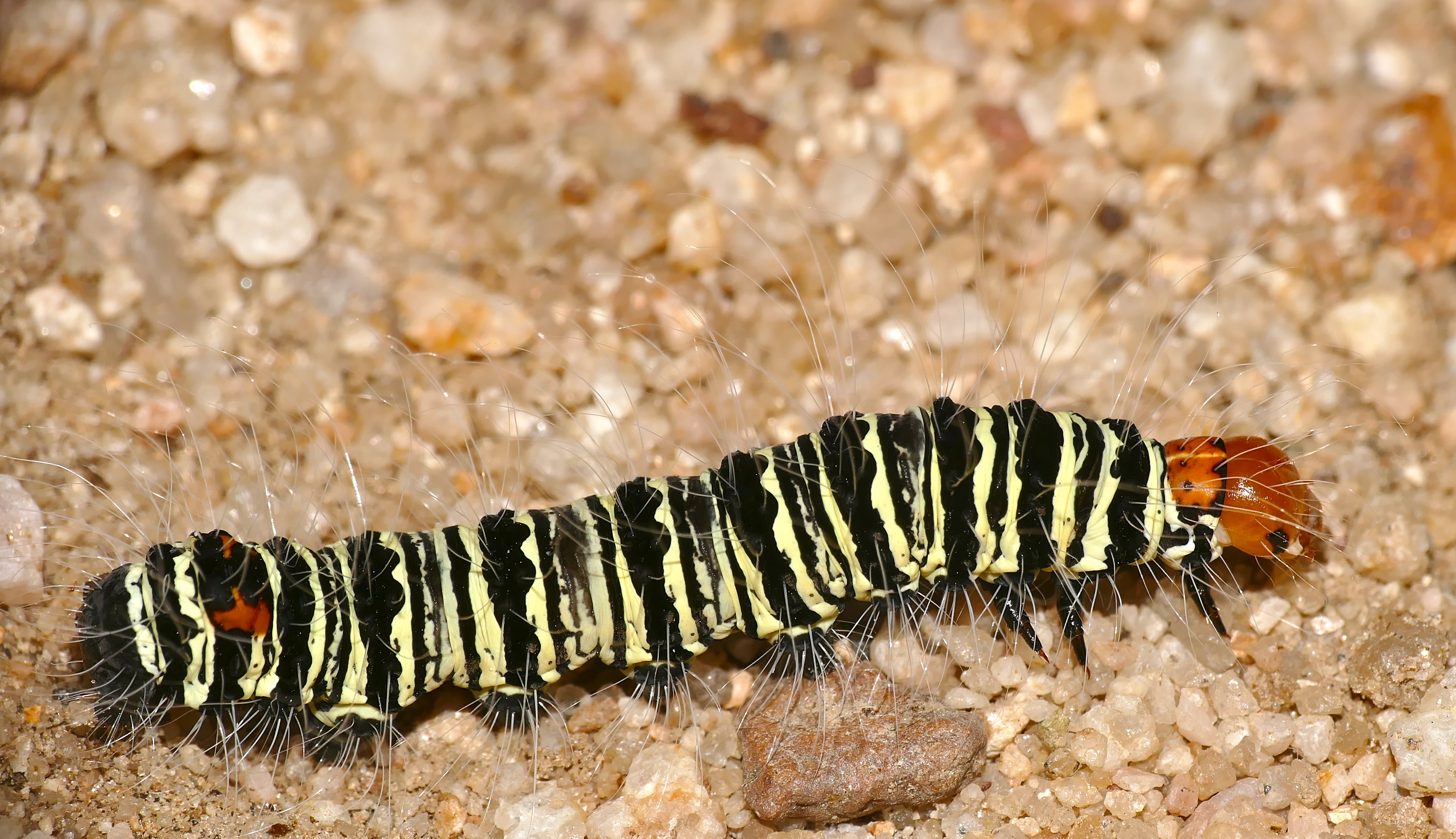
- Caterpillar of A. speciosa walking on gravel
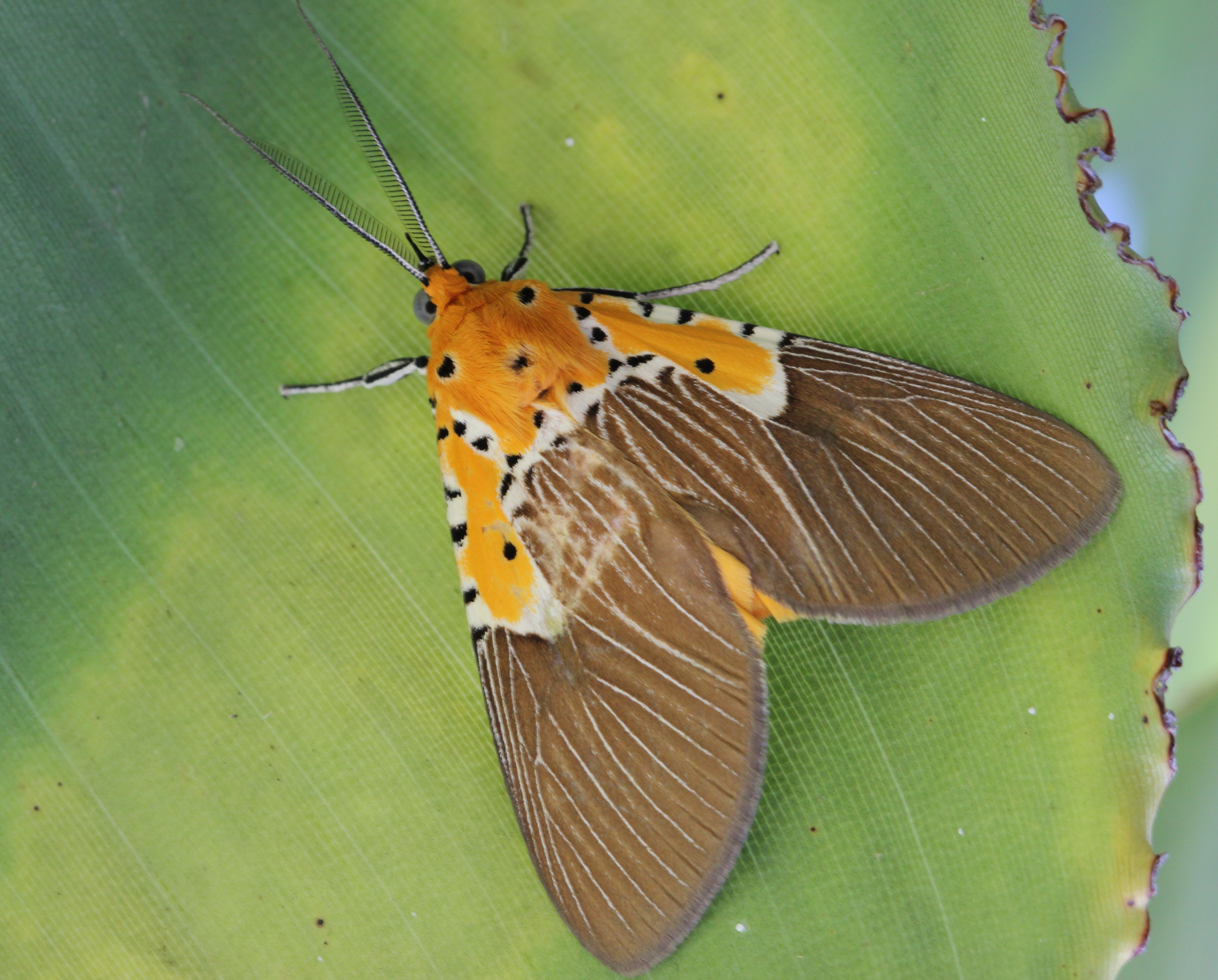
- Moth of A. speciosa laying on a leaf

Scientific classification
- Domain: Eukaryota
- Kingdom: Animalia
- Phylum: Arthropoda
- Class: Insecta
- Order: Lepidoptera
- Superfamily: Noctuoidea
- Family: Erebidae
- Genus: Asota
- Species: A. speciosa

Binomial name
- Asota speciosa (Drury, 1773)

Synonyms
- Phalaena speciosa Drury, 1773; Aganais speciosa (Drury, 1773); Hypsa subretracta Walker, 1856; Hypsa undulifera Walker, 1856; Aganais aphidas Hopffer, 1858; Pseudhypsa baumanniana Karsch, 1895; Aganais unicolor Rothschild, 1896; Aganais conspicua Swinhoe, 1903

= Asota speciosa =

Specious tiger

Species of moth

Asota speciosa, the specious tiger, formerly Aganais speciosa, is a moth of the subfamily Aganainae, now regarded as part of the family Erebidae. Formerly it was regarded variously as a member of the Arctiidae, the Hypsidae, and subsequently the family Aganaidae, which was formerly regarded as a family by some authorities. The species is widespread in sub-Saharan Africa, such as in Sierra Leone, Togo, Nigeria, Cameroon, Mozambique and South Africa.

The larvae feed on certain latex-rich plants, mainly Ficus species (fig trees), both indigenous and domestic, but also on poisonous Acokanthera species. They sabotage the latex defences of their host plants by biting partway through the midrib, severing the latex vessels before proceeding to feed on the portion of the leaf blade distal to the sabotage, which is no longer supplied with latex.
