= Soloella orientis =

Scientific classification
- Domain: Eukaryota
- Kingdom: Animalia
- Phylum: Arthropoda
- Class: Insecta
- Order: Lepidoptera
- Superfamily: Noctuoidea
- Family: Erebidae
- Genus: Soloella
- Species: S. orientis

Binomial name
- Soloella orientis Kühne, 2007

Species of moth

Soloella orientis is a species of moth in the family Erebidae. The species is known only from Kenya.
