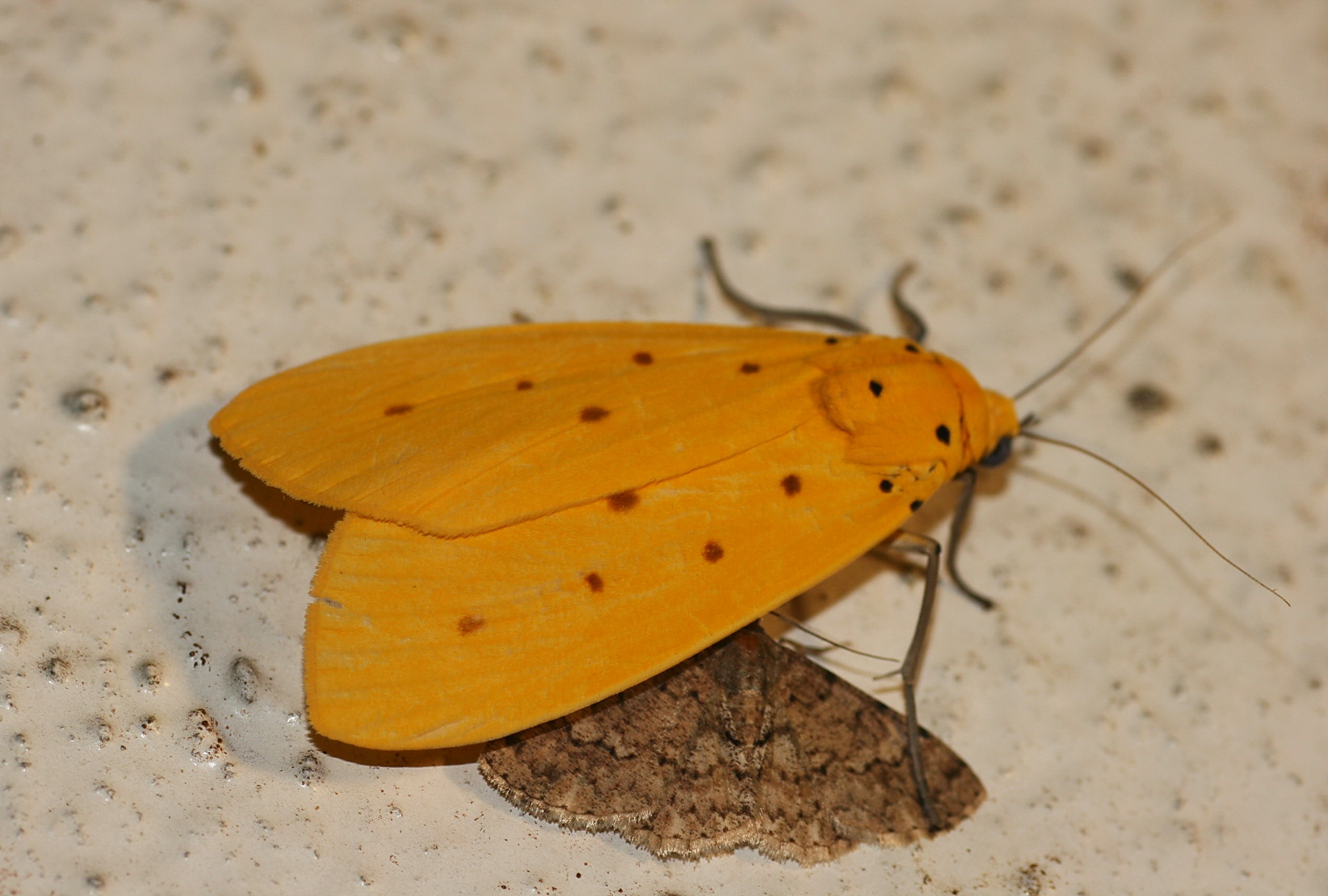

Scientific classification
- Kingdom: Animalia
- Phylum: Arthropoda
- Class: Insecta
- Order: Lepidoptera
- Superfamily: Noctuoidea
- Family: Erebidae
- Genus: Agape
- Species: A. chloropyga

Binomial name
- Agape chloropyga (Walker, 1854)

Synonyms
- Hypsa chloropyga Walker, 1854; Hypsa analis Walker, 1856; Agape cyanopyga Felder, 1874; Agape chloropyga var. snelleni Gaede, 1914

= Agape chloropyga =

Species of moth

Agape chloropyga is a species of moth in the family Erebidae. The species is found from Malaysia to eastern Australia, including Borneo and Papua New Guinea.

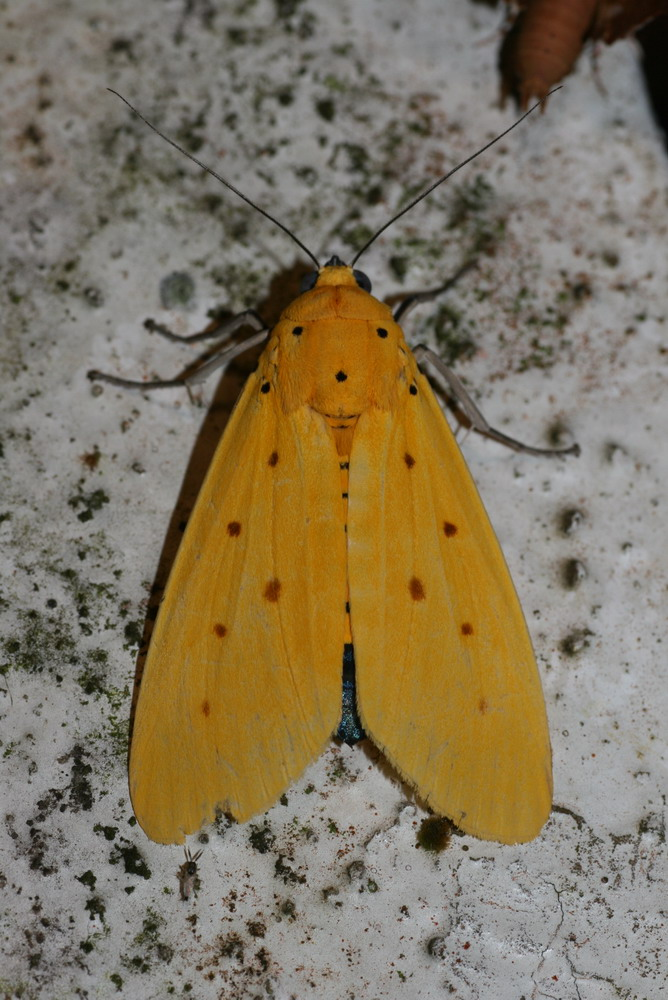

The wingspan is about 60 mm.

The larvae feed on the leaves of Moraceae species, including Ficus macrophylla and Ficus microcarpa.
