= Soloella guttivaga =

Scientific classification
- Kingdom: Animalia
- Phylum: Arthropoda
- Class: Insecta
- Order: Lepidoptera
- Superfamily: Noctuoidea
- Family: Erebidae
- Genus: Soloella
- Species: S. guttivaga

Binomial name
- Soloella guttivaga (Walker, 1854)

Synonyms
- Soloe guttivaga Walker, 1854; Nudaria tosola Plötz, 1880

Species of moth

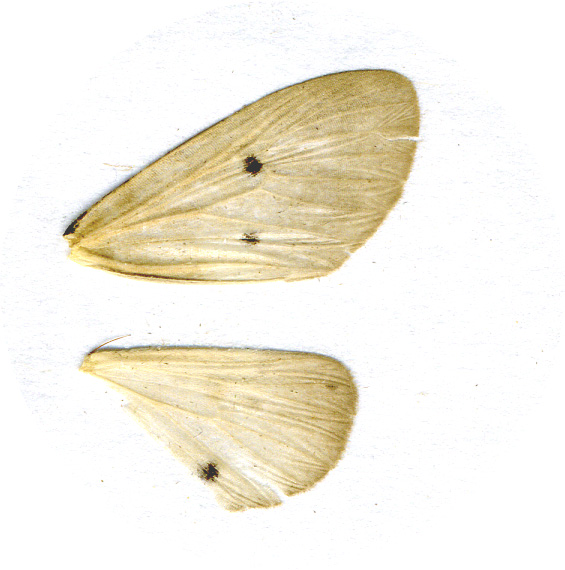

Soloella guttivaga is a species of moth in the family Erebidae. The species is found in Africa, including Nigeria and Congo.
