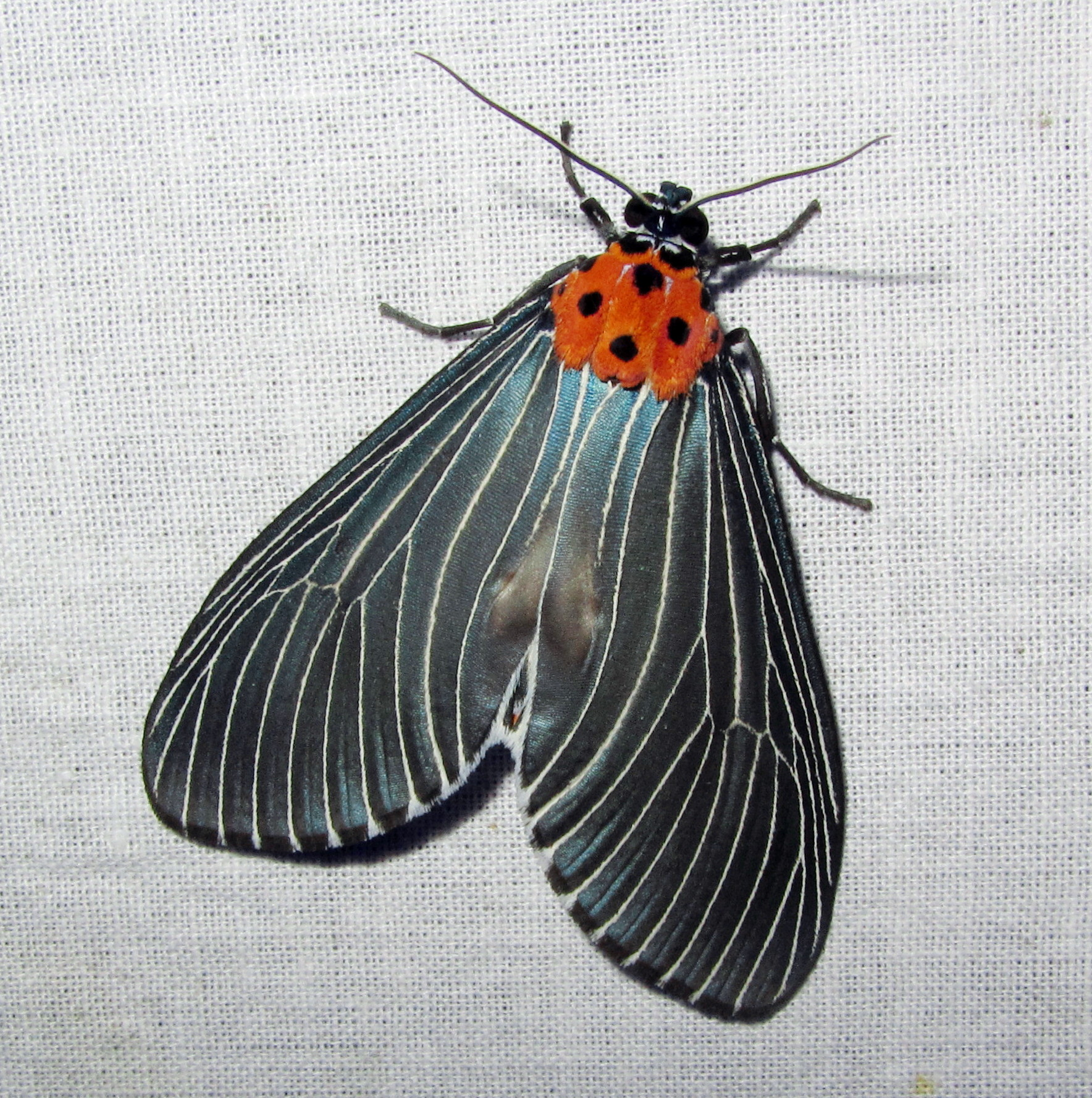
- Neochera marmorea

Scientific classification
- Kingdom: Animalia
- Phylum: Arthropoda
- Clade: Pancrustacea
- Class: Insecta
- Order: Lepidoptera
- Superfamily: Noctuoidea
- Family: Erebidae
- Subfamily: Aganainae
- Genus: Neochera; Hübner, [1819]

Synonyms
- Philona Walker, 1854

= Neochera =

Genus of moths

Neochera is a genus of moths in the family Erebidae described by Jacob Hübner in 1819.

== Species ==
- Neochera dominia Cramer, 1780
- Neochera inops Walker, 1854
- Neochera marmorea (Walker, 1856)
- Neochera privata Walker, 1862
