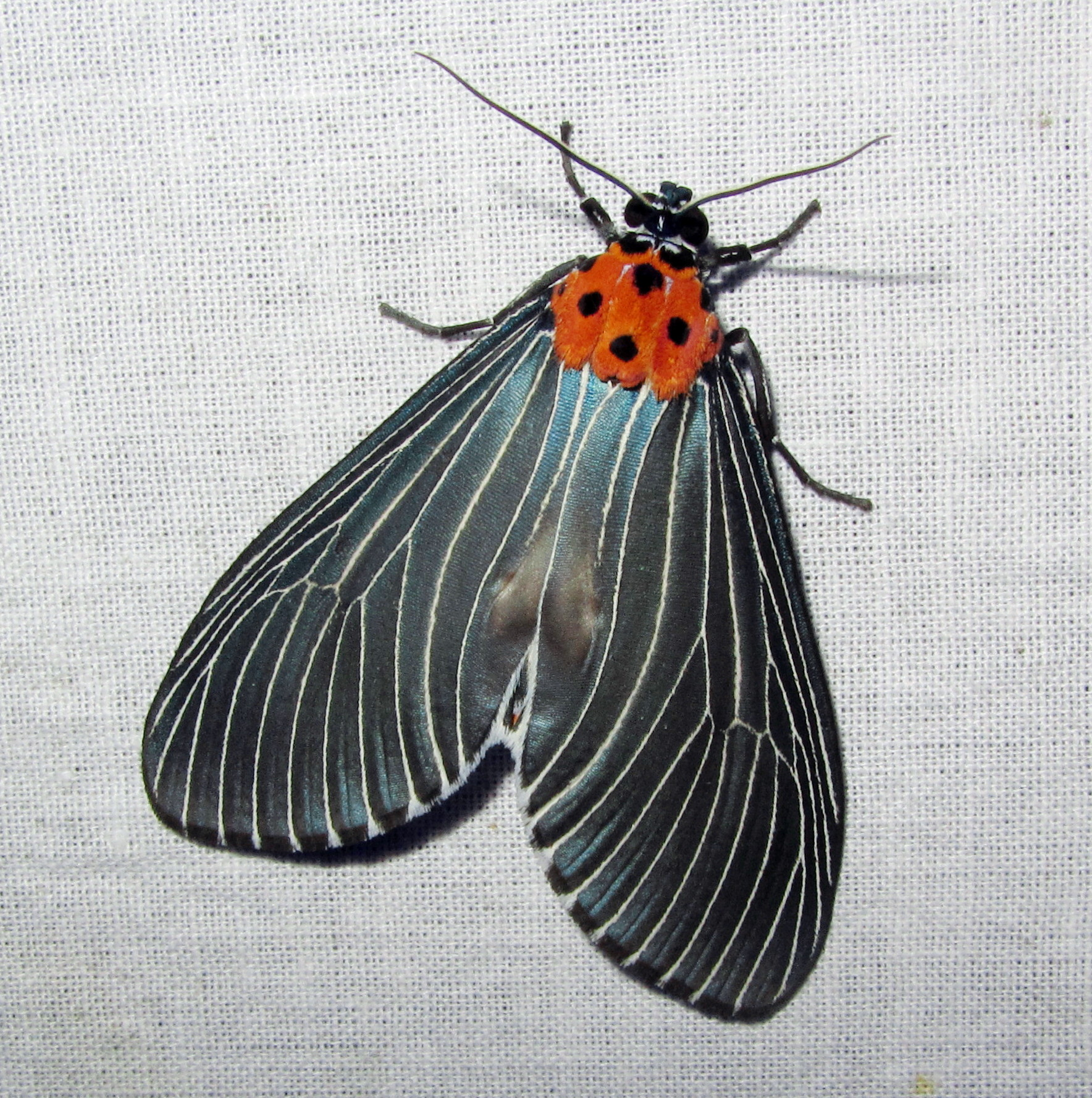

Scientific classification
- Kingdom: Animalia
- Phylum: Arthropoda
- Class: Insecta
- Order: Lepidoptera
- Superfamily: Noctuoidea
- Family: Erebidae
- Genus: Neochera
- Species: N. marmorea

Binomial name
- Neochera marmorea (Walker, 1856)

Synonyms
- Hypsa marmorea Walker, 1856; Neochera bhawana Moore, 1859

= Neochera marmorea =

Species of moth

Neochera marmorea is a moth in the family Erebidae. It is found in Indonesia, Malaysia, the Philippines, Sikkim and Yunnan.

The wingspan is 66–75 mm.

== Subspecies ==
- Neochera marmorea bhawana (Indonesia, Malaysia, Philippines, Sikkim)
- Neochera marmorea marmorea (China, India, Philippines)
