= Agape arctioides =

Scientific classification
- Kingdom: Animalia
- Phylum: Arthropoda
- Class: Insecta
- Order: Lepidoptera
- Superfamily: Noctuoidea
- Family: Erebidae
- Genus: Agape
- Species: A. arctioides

Binomial name
- Agape arctioides (Butler, 1887)

Synonyms
- Spilobotys arctioides Butler, 1887; Agape innominata Gaede, 1914

Species of moth

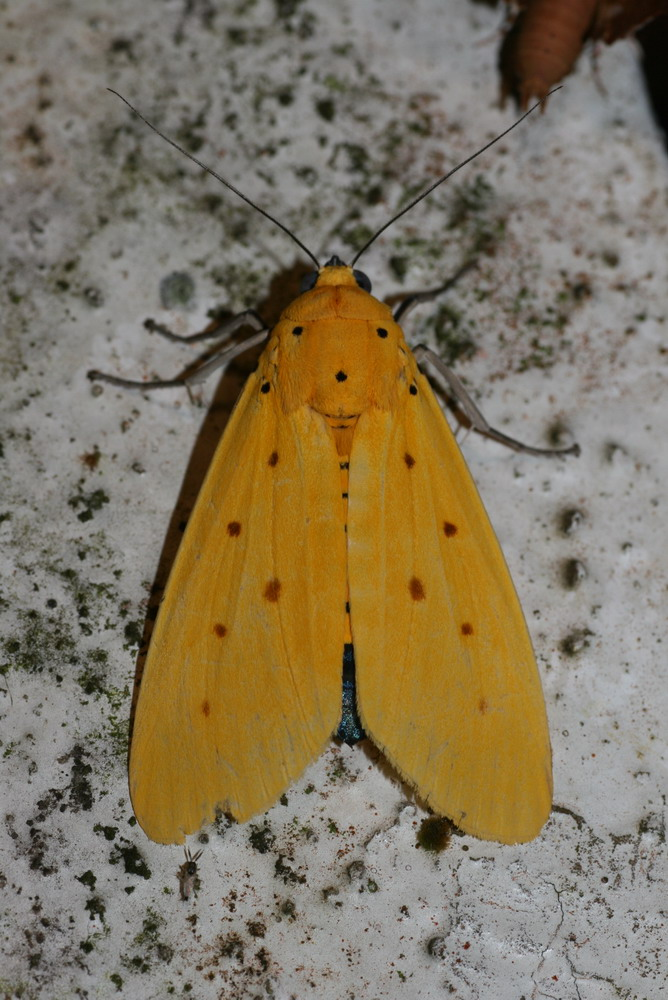
Agape arctioides

Agape arctioides is a species of moth in the family Erebidae first described by Arthur Gardiner Butler in 1887. The species is found on Seram, the Solomon Islands (Guadalcanal and Santa Isabel Island) and in Thailand.
