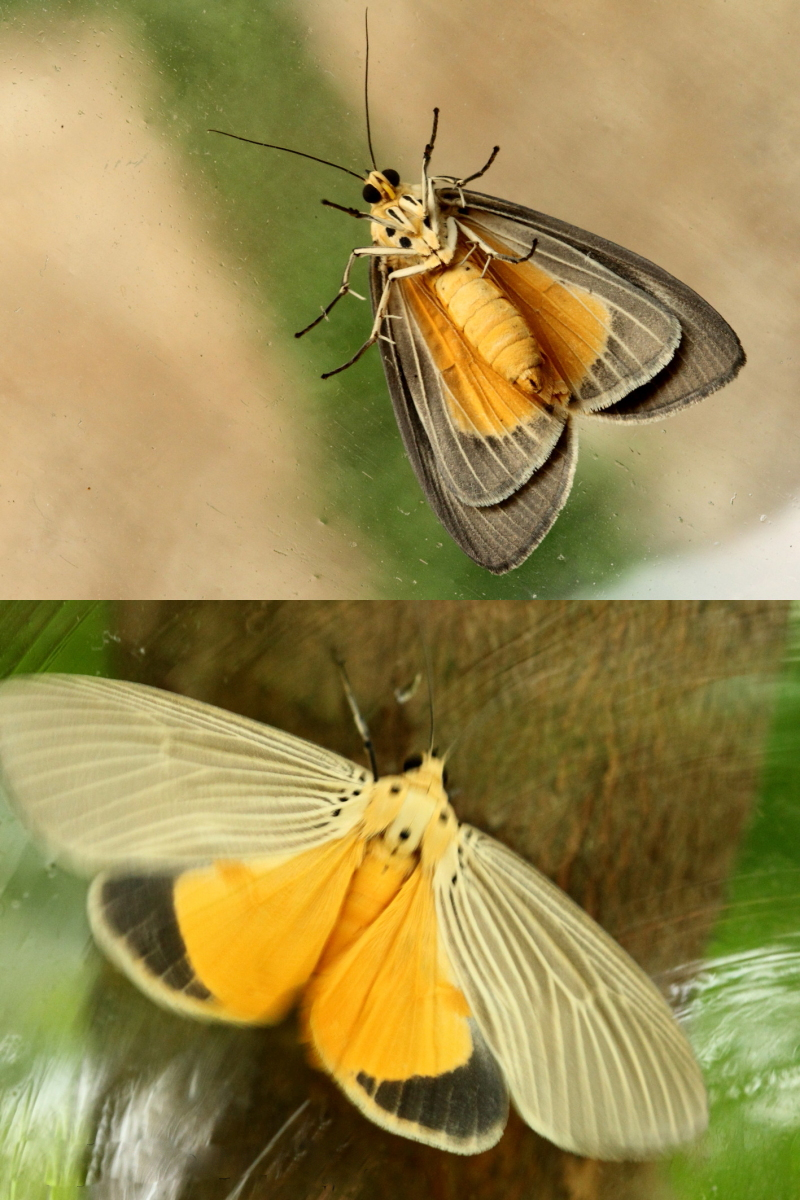

Scientific classification
- Kingdom: Animalia
- Phylum: Arthropoda
- Class: Insecta
- Order: Lepidoptera
- Superfamily: Noctuoidea
- Family: Erebidae
- Genus: Neochera
- Species: N. inops

Binomial name
- Neochera inops (Walker, 1854)

Synonyms
- Hypsa inops Walker, 1854

= Neochera inops =

Species of moth

Neochera inops is a moth in the family Erebidae. It is found from the north-eastern Himalaya to Sundaland and Palawan, including Bangladesh (Silhet), China (Hainan, Shaanxi, Yunnan), India (Assam, Darjeeling, Tamil Nadu), Indonesia (Borneo), Laos, Malaysia (Labuan, Perak), Myanmar, the Philippines (Balabac, Palawan, Mindoro), Sikkim, Thailand and northern Vietnam.

The wingspan is about 50 mm.
