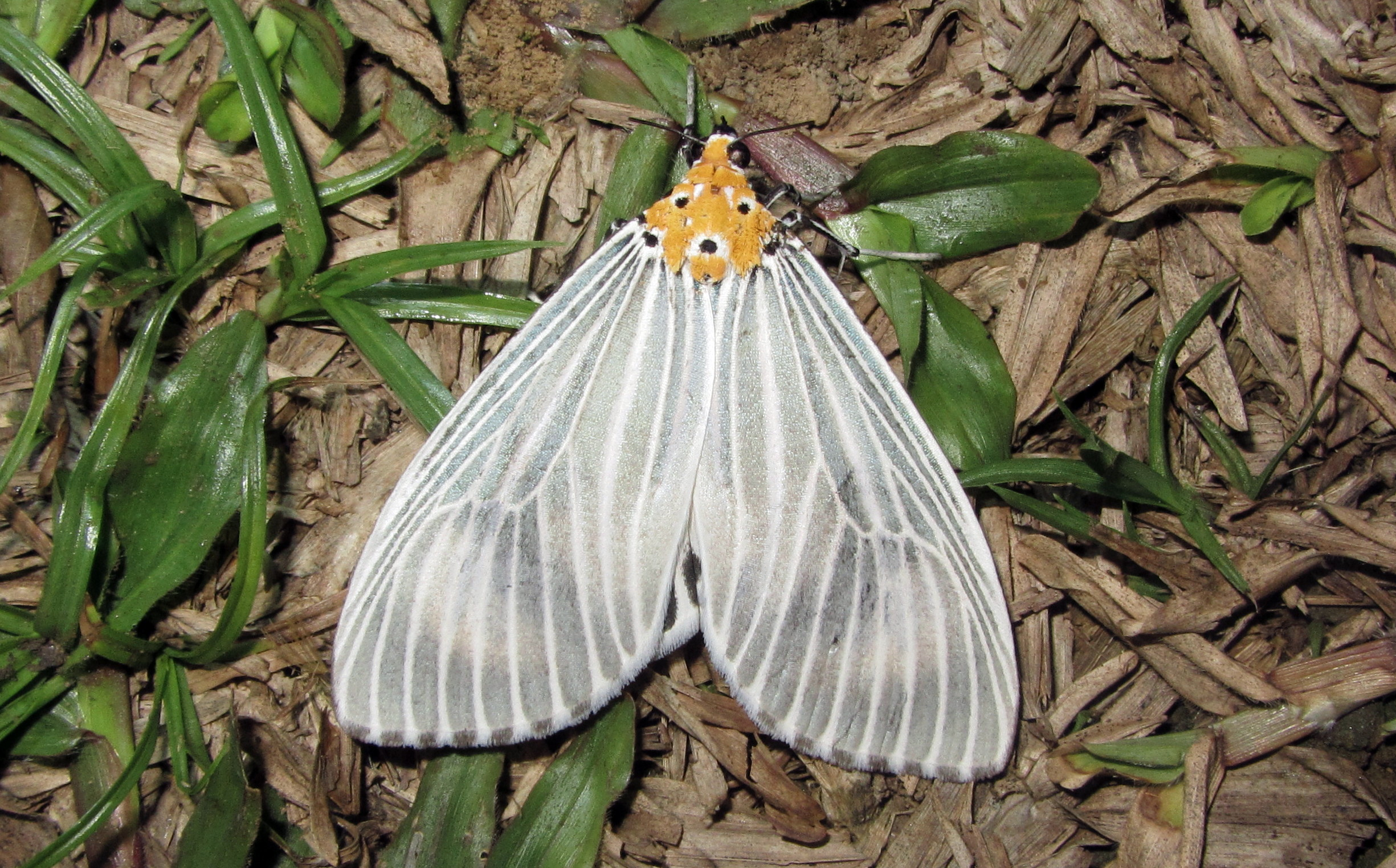

Scientific classification
- Kingdom: Animalia
- Phylum: Arthropoda
- Class: Insecta
- Order: Lepidoptera
- Superfamily: Noctuoidea
- Family: Erebidae
- Genus: Neochera
- Species: N. dominia

Binomial name
- Neochera dominia (Cramer, 1780)

Synonyms
- Phalaena dominia Cramer, 1780; Aganais herpa Snellen, 1879; Noctua chione Fabricius, 1781; Phalaena Bombyx eugenia Cramer, 1782; Neochera stibosthetia Butler, 1875; Hypsa basilissa Meyrick, 1886; Neochera heliconides Snellen, 1888; Neochera butleri Swinhoe, 1892; Neochera zaria Swinhoe, 1892; Neochera affinis Rothschild, 1896; Neochera fumosa Rothschild, 1896; Neochera fuscipennis Rothschild, 1896; Neochera javana Rothschild, 1896; Neochera papuana Rothschild, 1896; Neochera proxima Rothschild, 1896; Neochera echione (Fabricius, 1793)

= Neochera dominia =

Species of moth

Neochera dominia is a species of moth in the family Erebidae. It is found from the Indo-Australian tropics from India to Queensland and the Solomons.

The wingspan of an adult Neochera dominia ranges from 68 to 72 mm. They have a characteristic bluish gray ground color forewing, bold white streaking on the veins and pure white ground color hindwing, with bluish black spots in terminal area (which can be seen in the example picture in the infobox). In the male reproductive organ, the saccus is rectangular, with upside somewhat more narrow, with a nearby sclerotized semi-circular spur. The larvae feed on Marsdenia species.

As of 2016, the only sample of these species are collected in Bokor, Cambodia in 2013.

== Subspecies ==
The moth can be found in Cambodia, Thailand, Myanmar, India, South China, Taiwan, Indonesia, Philippines, North Australia:

- Neochera dominia affinis (Indonesia, Papua New Guinea)
- Neochera dominia basilissa (Australia, Indonesia)
- Neochera dominia butleri (China, India, Indonesia, Malaysia, Myanmar, Nepal, the Philippines, Sikkim, Thailand, northern Vietnam)
- Neochera dominia contraria (Vanuatu)
- Neochera dominia dominia (India, Indonesia)
- Neochera dominia eugenia (Indonesia, Papua New Guinea and Philippines)
- Neochera dominia fumosa (Indonesia)
- Neochera dominia fuscipennis (Papua New Guinea)
- Neochera dominia heliconides (Sumbawa, Philippines: Palawan, Luzon, Negros)
- Neochera dominia herpa (Indonesia)
- Neochera dominia javana (Indonesia)
- Neochera dominia papuana (Indonesia and Papua New Guinea)
- Neochera dominia proxima (Indonesia: Java and Timor, Papua New Guinea)
- Neochera dominia stibostethia (Buru)
