= Soloella =

Scientific classification
- Domain: Eukaryota
- Kingdom: Animalia
- Phylum: Arthropoda
- Class: Insecta
- Order: Lepidoptera
- Superfamily: Noctuoidea
- Family: Erebidae
- Subfamily: Aganainae
- Genus: Soloella; Gaede, 1926

Genus of moths

Soloella is a genus of moths in the family Erebidae erected by Max Gaede in 1926.

== Species ==
- Soloella guttivaga (Walker, 1854)
- Soloella orientis Kühne, 2007
