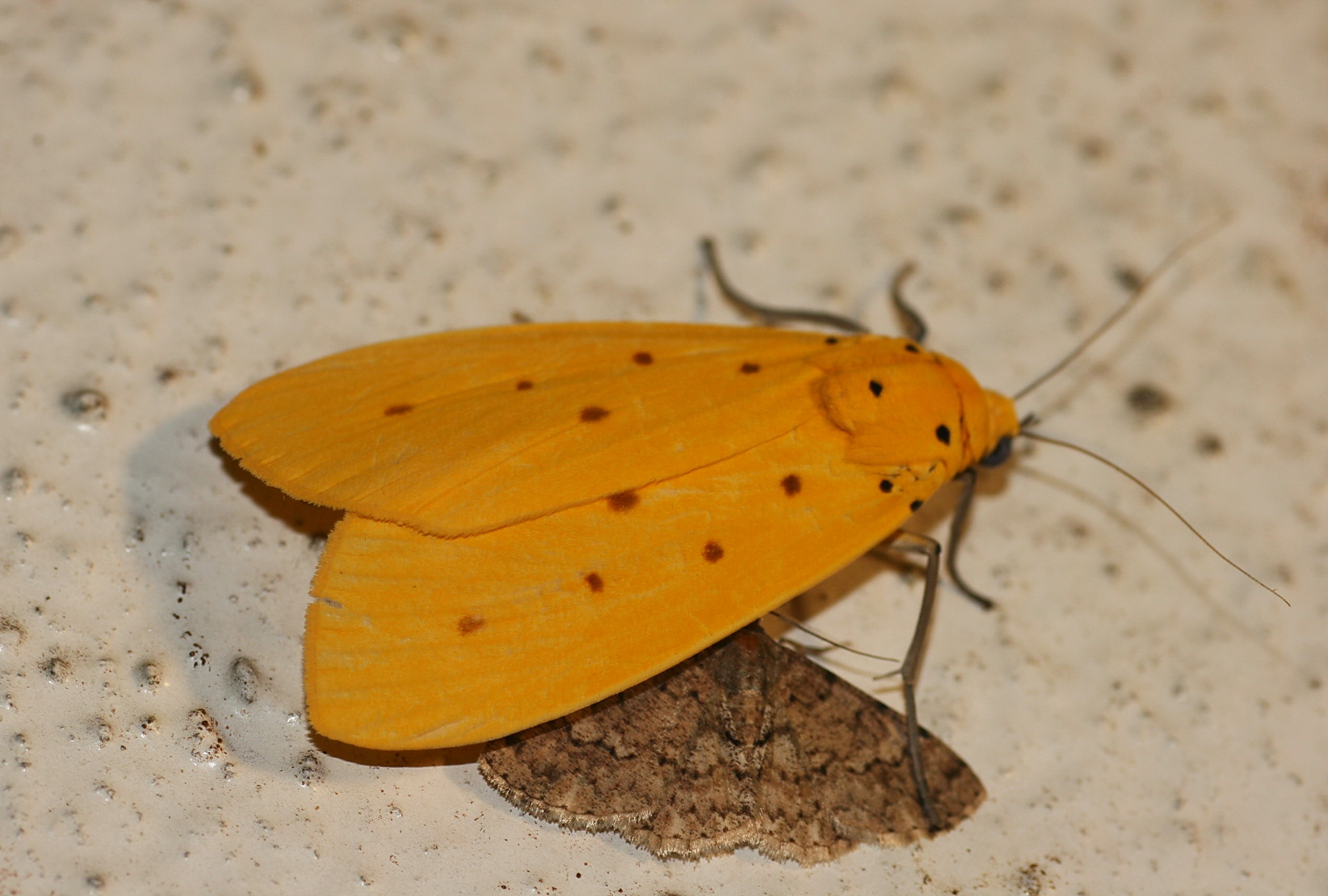
- Agape chloropyga

Scientific classification
- Domain: Eukaryota
- Kingdom: Animalia
- Phylum: Arthropoda
- Class: Insecta
- Order: Lepidoptera
- Superfamily: Noctuoidea
- Family: Erebidae
- Subfamily: Aganainae
- Genus: Agape; Felder, 1874

= Agape (moth) =

Genus of moths

Agape is a genus of moths in the family Erebidae.

== Species ==
- Agape arctioides Butler, 1887
- Agape chloropyga Walker, 1854
