= Neochera privata =

Scientific classification
- Kingdom: Animalia
- Phylum: Arthropoda
- Class: Insecta
- Order: Lepidoptera
- Superfamily: Noctuoidea
- Family: Erebidae
- Genus: Neochera
- Species: N. privata

Binomial name
- Neochera privata Walker, 1862

Synonyms
- Neochera cinerascens Moore, 1877; Neochera tenuimargo Rothschild, 1896

Species of moth

Neochera privata is a moth in the family Erebidae. It is found from the Andamans, Sundaland, Nias and the Lesser Sundas to Timor.

The wingspan is about 50 mm.

== Subspecies ==
- Neochera privata fennekenae (Sulawesi)
- Neochera privata privata (Andamans, Sundaland, Nias, Lesser Sundas, Timor)
