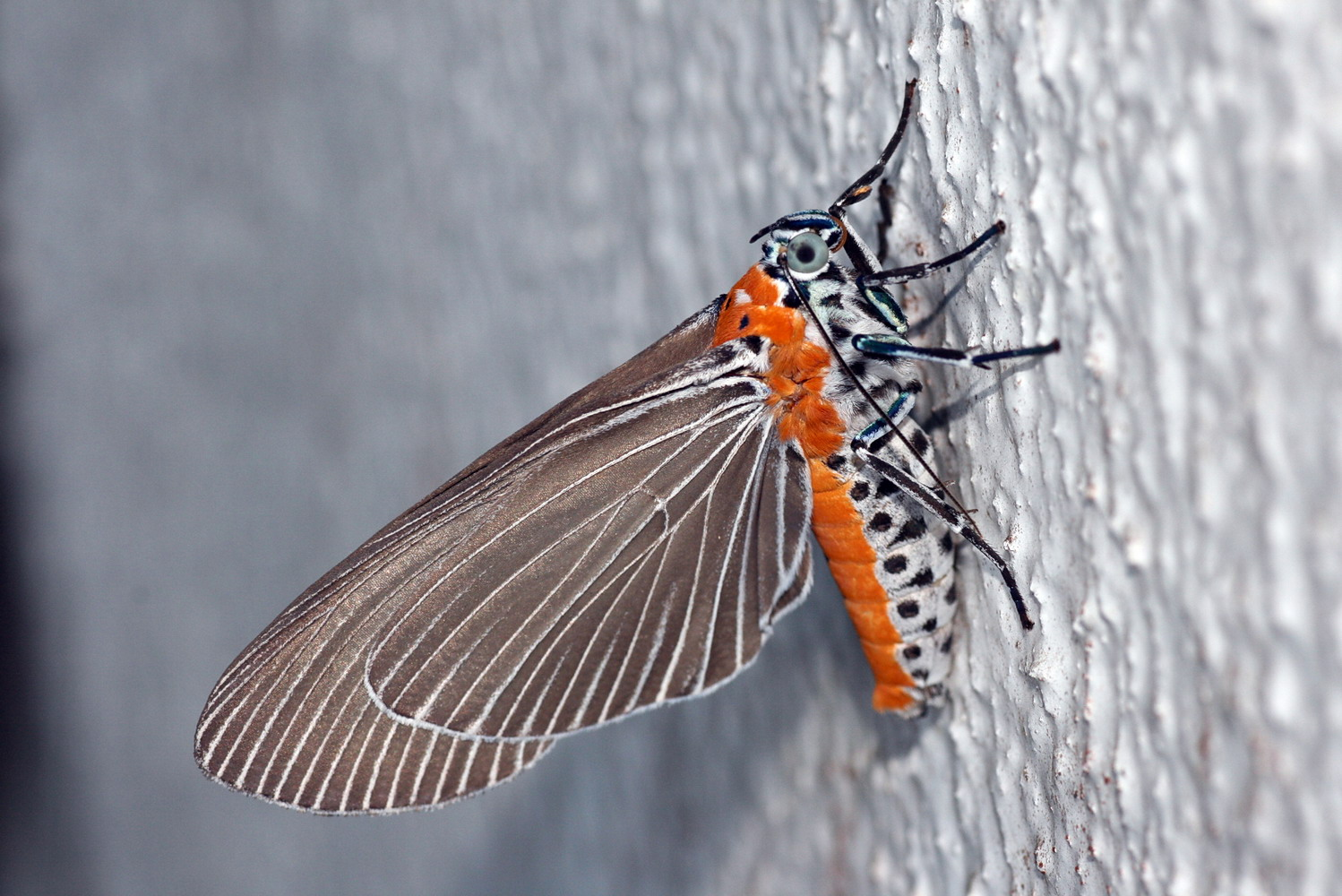

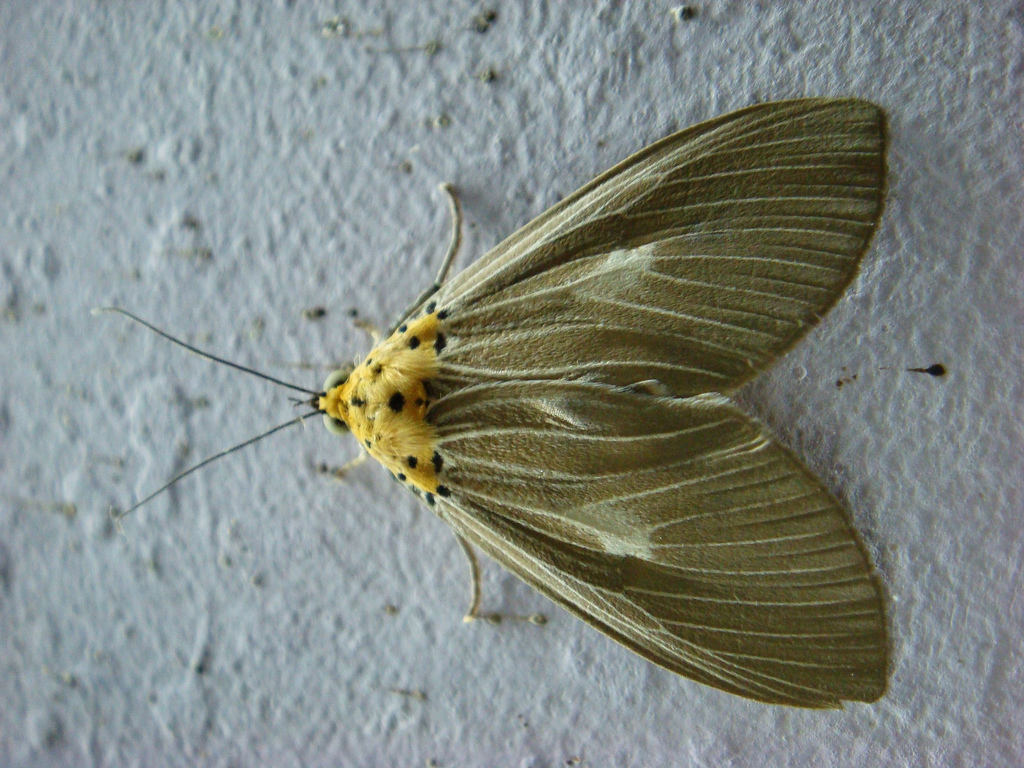

Scientific classification
- Kingdom: Animalia
- Phylum: Arthropoda
- Clade: Pancrustacea
- Class: Insecta
- Order: Lepidoptera
- Superfamily: Noctuoidea
- Family: Erebidae
- Genus: Euplocia; Hübner, [1819]
- Species: E. membliaria

Binomial name
- Euplocia membliaria (Cramer, 1780)

Synonyms
- Phalaena membliaria Cramer, 1780; Aganais renigera Felder, 1874; Euplocia moderata Butler, 1875; Euplocia inconspicua Butler, 1875; Euplocia radians Snellen, 1879

= Euplocia =

Genus of moths

Euplocia is a monotypic moth genus in the family Erebidae erected by Jacob Hübner in 1819. Its only species, Euplocia membliaria, was first described by Pieter Cramer in 1780. It is found from the northeastern Himalayas to Sundaland, the Philippines, Sulawesi and the Lesser Sundas.

The wingspan is about 70 mm.
