= List of moths of South Africa (Noctuidae) =

This is a list of moths of the family Noctuidae that are found in South Africa. It also acts as an index to the species articles and forms part of the full List of moths of South Africa.

- Ableptina nubifera (Hampson, 1902)
- Abrostola brevipennis (Walker, 1858)
- Abrostola oculea Dufay, 1958
- Abrostola triopis Hampson, 1902h
- Acanthodelta distriga Hampson, 1908
- Acantholipes namacensis (Guenée, 1852)
- Acantholipes trajecta (Walker, 1865)
- Acantholipes trimeni Felder & Rogenhofer, 1874
- Achaea boris (Geyer, 1837)
- Achaea catella Guenée, 1852
- Achaea chrysopera Druce, 1912
- Achaea echo (Walker, 1858)
- Achaea ezea (Cramer, 1779)
- Achaea faber Holland, 1894
- Achaea finita (Guenée, 1852)
- Achaea illustrata Walker, 1858
- Achaea indeterminata (Walker, 1865)
- Achaea infinita (Guenée, 1852)
- Achaea intermedia Wallengren, 1856
- Achaea lienardi (Boisduval, 1833)
- Achaea mercatoria (Fabricius, 1775)
- Achaea mormoides Walker, 1858
- Achaea obvia Hampson, 1913
- Achaea praestans (Guenée, 1852)
- Achaea rufobrunnea Strand, 1913
- Achaea sordida (Walker, 1865)
- Achaea tornistigma Prout, 1921
- Achaea trapezoides (Guenée, 1862)
- Acontia accola (Felder & Rogenhofer, 1874)
- Acontia antica Walker, 1862
- Acontia bechuana Hacker, Legrain & Fibiger, 2010
- Acontia bidentata (Hampson, 1902)
- Acontia caffraria (Cramer, 1777)
- Acontia capensis Hacker, Legrain & Fibiger, 2008
- Acontia chrysoproctis (Hampson, 1902)
- Acontia citripennis (Hampson, 1910)
- Acontia conifrons (Aurivillius, 1879)
- Acontia discoidea Hopffer, 1857
- Acontia dispar (Walker, [1858])
- Acontia dorothea Hacker, Legrain & Fibiger, 2008
- Acontia ectorrida (Hampson, 1916)
- Acontia flavitermina (Hampson, 1902)
- Acontia gradata Walker, 1858
- Acontia gratiosa Wallengren, 1856
- Acontia guttifera Felder & Rogenhofer, 1874
- Acontia hampsoni Hacker, Legrain & Fibiger, 2008
- Acontia imitatrix Wallengren, 1856
- Acontia insocia (Walker, 1857)
- Acontia katrina Hacker, Legrain & Fibiger, 2008
- Acontia kruegeri Hacker, Legrain & Fibiger, 2008
- Acontia leucotrigona (Hampson, 1905)
- Acontia margaritata (Drury, 1782)
- Acontia mellicula Hacker, Legrain & Fibiger, 2008
- Acontia mionides (Hampson, 1905)
- Acontia natalis (Guenée, 1852)
- Acontia nephele Hampson, 1911
- Acontia nubilata (Hampson, 1902)
- Acontia oranjensis Hacker, Legrain & Fibiger, 2008
- Acontia paratrigona Hacker, Legrain & Fibiger, 2008
- Acontia permutata Hacker, Legrain & Fibiger, 2008
- Acontia porphyrea (Butler, 1898)
- Acontia psaliphora (Hampson, 1910)
- Acontia santalucia Hacker, Legrain & Fibiger, 2008
- Acontia silus Wallengren, 1875
- Acontia simo Wallengren, 1860
- Acontia sphendonistis (Hampson, 1902)
- Acontia tanzaniae Hacker, Legrain & Fibiger, 2010
- Acontia tetragonisa (Hampson, 1910)
- Acontia tinctilis Wallengren, 1875
- Acontia torrefacta (Distant, 1898)
- Acontia transfigurata Wallengren, 1856
- Acontia trimaculata Aurivillius, 1879
- Acontia trychaenoides Wallengren, 1856
- Acontia umbrigera Felder & Rogenhofer, 1874
- Acontia wahlbergi Wallengren, 1856
- Acrapex aenigma (Felder & Rogenhofer, 1874)
- Acrapex albivena Hampson, 1910
- Acrapex breviptera Janse, 1939
- Acrapex brunnea Hampson, 1910
- Acrapex curvata Hampson, 1902
- Acrapex festiva Janse, 1939
- Acrapex fuscifasciata Janse, 1939
- Acrapex hemiphlebia (Hampson, 1914)
- Acrapex metaphaea Hampson, 1910
- Acrapex minima Janse, 1939
- Acrapex mystica Janse, 1939
- Acrapex simplex Janse, 1939
- Acrapex stygiata (Hampson, 1910)
- Acrapex tristrigata Warren, 1914
- Acronicta niveogrisea Krüger, 2001
- Acronicta silvicola Krüger, 2001
- Acronicta transvalica Hampson, 1911
- Acronicta vumbae Krüger, 2001
- Adisura aerugo (Felder & Rogenhofer, 1874)
- Adisura atkinsoni Moore, 1881
- Aedia leucomelas (Linnaeus, 1758)
- Aegocera fervida (Walker, 1854)
- Afrogortyna altimontana Krüger, 1997
- Afrogortyna trinota (Herrich-Schäffer, 1854)
- Agoma trimenii (Felder, 1874)
- Agrapha amydra (Dufay, 1972)
- Agrapha caelata (Dufay, 1972)
- Agrapha phoceoides (Dufay, 1972)
- Agrapha polycampta (Dufay, 1972)
- Agrapha scoteina (Dufay, 1972)
- Agrotis biconica Kollar, 1844
- Agrotis bilix Guenée, 1852
- Agrotis bitriangula Hampson, 1902
- Agrotis caffra (Hampson, 1903)
- Agrotis cinctithorax (Walker, 1857)
- Agrotis contingens (Warren, 1914)
- Agrotis crassilinea Wallengren, 1860
- Agrotis ipsilon (Hufnagel, 1766)
- Agrotis lanidorsa Guenée, 1852
- Agrotis longidentifera (Hampson, 1903)
- Agrotis oliveata Hampson, 1902
- Agrotis perirrorata Hampson, 1902
- Agrotis segetum ([Denis & Schiffermüller], 1775)
- Agrotis subalba Walker, 1857
- Alelimma pallicostalis Hampson, 1902
- Aletia consanguis (Guenée, 1852)
- Aletia inframicans (Hampson, 1893)
- Aletia panarista (D. S. Fletcher, 1963)
- Aletia pyrausta (Hampson, 1913)
- Aletia tincta (Walker, 1858)
- Amazonides atrisigna (Hampson, 1911)
- Amazonides dividens (Walker, 1857)
- Amazonides putrefacta (Guenée, 1852)
- Amazonides rufomixta (Hampson, 1903)
- Amblyprora magnifica (Schaus, 1893)
- Amefrontia purpurea Hampson, 1899
- Amphia subunita Guenée, 1852
- Amphidrina melanosema Hampson, 1914
- Amphidrina pexicera Hampson, 1909
- Amphidrina sinistra Janse, 1938
- Amyna axis Guenée, 1852
- Amyna natalica Pinhey, 1975
- Amyna punctum (Fabricius, 1794)
- Anathetis atrirena (Hampson, 1902)
- Anathetis melanofascia Janse, 1938
- Androlymnia torsivena (Hampson, 1902)
- Anedhella interrupta (Janse, 1938)
- Anedhella nigrivittata (Hampson, 1902)
- Anedhella stigmata (Janse, 1938)
- Anoba angulilinea (Holland, 1894)
- Anoba atriplaga (Walker, 1858)
- Anoba atripuncta (Hampson, 1902)
- Anoba disjuncta (Walker, 1865)
- Anoba hamifera (Hampson, 1902)
- Anoba microloba Hampson, 1926
- Anoba phaeotermesia Hampson, 1926
- Anoba plumipes (Wallengren, 1860)
- Anoba sinuata (Fabricius, 1775)
- Anomis auragoides (Guenée, 1852)
- Anomis bidentata (Hampson, 1910)
- Anomis capensis (Gaede, 1940)
- Anomis erosa (Hübner, 1818)
- Anomis flava (Fabricius, 1775)
- Anomis fulvida Guenée, 1852
- Anomis leona (Schaus & Clements, 1893)
- Anomis luperca Möschler, 1883
- Anomis sabulifera (Guenée, 1852)
- Anomis simulatrix (Walker, 1856)
- Anomis subrosealis (Walker, 1866)
- Antarchaea fragilis (Butler, 1875)
- Anticarsia rubricans (Boisduval, 1833)
- Antiophlebia bracteata Felder, 1874
- Apospasta dipterigidia (Hampson, 1902)
- Araea indecora (Felder & Rogenhofer, 1874)
- Araeopteron griseata Hampson, 1907
- Archephia basilinea (Hampson, 1902)
- Arenarba destituta (Moore, 1884)
- Argyrogramma signata (Fabricius, 1775)
- Ariathisa abyssinia (Guenée, 1852)
- Ariathisa semiluna (Hampson, 1909)
- Ascalapha odorata (Linnaeus, 1758)
- Asota borbonica (Boisduval, 1833)
- Asota speciosa (Drury, 1773)
- Aspidifrontia radiata Hampson, 1905
- Asplenia melanodonta (Hampson, 1896)
- Athetis absorbens (Walker, 1857)
- Athetis aeneolineata Krüger, 2001
- Athetis aeschria Hampson, 1909
- Athetis albipuncta (Hampson, 1902)
- Athetis alpina Krüger, 2001
- Athetis alternata (Janse, 1938)
- Athetis assecta Krüger, 2001
- Athetis atristicta Hampson, 1918
- Athetis aurobrunnea (Janse, 1938)
- Athetis aurogrisea Krüger, 2000
- Athetis auronitens Krüger, 2000
- Athetis bicornuta Krüger, 2000
- Athetis collaris (Wallengren, 1856)
- Athetis collicola Krüger, 2001
- Athetis consocia Krüger, 2001
- Athetis debilis Krüger, 2000
- Athetis duplex (Janse, 1938)
- Athetis euxoa Krüger, 2001
- Athetis excurvata (Janse, 1938)
- Athetis flavipuncta Hampson, 1909
- Athetis foveata Hampson, 1909
- Athetis fraus Krüger, 2000
- Athetis fulgens Krüger, 2001
- Athetis fumicolor (Janse, 1938)
- Athetis glauca (Hampson, 1902)
- Athetis gonionephra Hampson, 1909
- Athetis gracilis Krüger, 2001
- Athetis heliastis Hampson, 1909
- Athetis ignava (Guenée, 1852)
- Athetis instrata Krüger, 2001
- Athetis interlata (Walker, 1857)
- Athetis intricata Krüger, 2001
- Athetis leucopis (Hampson, 1902)
- Athetis melanephra Hampson, 1909
- Athetis melanomma Hampson, 1920
- Athetis melanopis Hampson, 1909
- Athetis melanosticta Hampson, 1909
- Athetis metis (Janse, 1938)
- Athetis micra (Hampson, 1902)
- Athetis mozambica Hampson, 1918
- Athetis nephrosticta Hampson, 1909
- Athetis nigra (Janse, 1938)
- Athetis nigristriata Krüger, 2000
- Athetis obscuroides Poole, 1989
- Athetis ocellata (Janse, 1938)
- Athetis pallescens (Janse, 1938)
- Athetis pallicornis (Felder & Rogenhofer, 1874)
- Athetis partita (Walker, 1857)
- Athetis perplexa (Janse, 1938)
- Athetis pigra (Guenée, 1852)
- Athetis restricta (Janse, 1938)
- Athetis rhigognostis Krüger, 2001
- Athetis robertsi (Janse, 1938)
- Athetis robusta Krüger, 2000
- Athetis rufipuncta (Hampson, 1902)
- Athetis satellitia (Hampson, 1902)
- Athetis signata (Janse, 1938)
- Athetis singula (Möschler, 1883)
- Athetis smintha (Hampson, 1902)
- Athetis sordida Krüger, 2001
- Athetis splendidula Krüger, 2001
- Athetis transvalensis (Janse, 1938)
- Athetis tristigmatica Krüger, 2000
- Athetis umbrigera Krüger, 2000
- Athetis xantholopha (Hampson, 1902)
- Athyrma anuliplaga Walker, 1865
- Attatha attathoides (Karsch, 1896)
- Attatha superba (Janse, 1917)
- Audea albifasciata Pinhey, 1968
- Audea bipunctata Walker, 1857
- Audea fatilega (Felder & Rogenhofer, 1874)
- Audea hypostigmata Hampson, 1913
- Audea melaleuca Walker, 1865
- Audea melanoplaga Hampson, 1902
- Audea subligata Distant, 1902
- Authadistis metaleuca Hampson, 1902
- Autoba admota (Felder & Rogenhofer, 1874)
- Autoba brachygonia (Hampson, 1910)
- Autoba costimacula (Saalmüller, 1880)
- Autoba olivacea (Walker, 1858)
- Avitta lineosa (Saalmüller, 1891)
- Axiopoeniella octocentra Vári, 1964
- Axylia annularis Saalmüller, 1891
- Axylia dispilata Swinhoe, 1891
- Axylia renalis Moore, 1881
- Bamra delicata Hampson, 1922
- Bamra marmorifera (Walker, 1858)
- Baniana arvorum (Guenée, 1852)
- Baniana culminifera Hampson, 1910
- Bareia incidens Walker, 1858
- Bleptina frontalis Walker, 1862
- Bleptina intractalis Walker, 1862
- Bocula terminata (Walker, 1869)
- Bonaberiana crassisquama Strand, 1915
- Brachypteragrotis patricei Viette, 1959
- Brephos ansorgei (Jordan, 1904)
- Brephos decora (Linnaeus, 1764)
- Brephos festiva (Jordan, 1913)
- Brephos incongruella Warren, 1914
- Brevipecten confluens Hampson, 1926
- Brevipecten cornuta Hampson, 1902
- Brevipecten legraini Hacker & Fibiger, 2007
- Brevipecten wolframmeyi Hacker & Fibiger, 2007
- Britha brithodes D. S. Fletcher, 1961
- Brithys crini (Fabricius, 1775)
- Brithysana speyeri (Felder & Rogenhofer, 1874)
- Busseola fusca (Fuller, 1901)
- Busseola obliquifascia (Hampson, 1909)
- Busseola phaia Bowden, 1956
- Calamia flavirufa Hampson, 1910
- Calesia karschi (Bartel, 1903)
- Calesia othello (Fawcett, 1916)
- Calesia phaiosoma (Hampson, 1891)
- Calesia xanthognatha Hampson, 1926
- Calesia zambesita Walker, 1865
- Caligatus angasii Wing, 1850
- Calliodes appollina Guenée, 1852
- Calliodes pretiosissima Holland, 1892
- Callixena versicolora Saalmüller, 1891
- Callopistria albivitta (Hampson, 1918)
- Callopistria insularis Butler, 1882
- Callopistria latreillei (Duponchel, 1827)
- Callopistria maillardi (Guenée, 1862)
- Callopistria natalensis (Hampson, 1908)
- Callopistria yerburii Butler, 1884
- Callyna decora Walker, 1858
- Callyna figurans Walker, 1858
- Callyna gaedei Hacker & Fibiger, 2006
- Callyna monoleuca Walker, 1858
- Callyna nigerrima Hampson, 1902
- Callyna unicolor Hampson, 1920
- Caradrina atriluna Guenée, 1852
- Caradrina clavipalpis (Scopoli, 1763)
- Caradrina eugraphis Janse, 1938
- Caradrina ferida Pagenstecher, 1893
- Caradrina glaucistis Hampson, 1902
- Caradrina supercilia Wallengren, 1856
- Caradrina tenebrata Hampson, 1902
- Carpostalagma chalybeata Talbot, 1929
- Catephia barrettae Hampson, 1905
- Catephia discophora Hampson, 1926
- Catephia pallididisca Hampson, 1926
- Catephia personata Walker, 1865
- Catephia squamosa (Wallengren, 1856)
- Catephia striata Hampson, 1902
- Catephia virescens Hampson, 1902
- Centrarthra albiapicata Warren, 1914
- Centrarthra albinotata Janse, 1938
- Centrarthra albipuncta Janse, 1938
- Centrarthra albistriga Janse, 1938
- Centrarthra albogrisea Janse, 1938
- Centrarthra argentea Warren, 1914
- Centrarthra brevipectinata Janse, 1938
- Centrarthra brunnea Warren, 1914
- Centrarthra cretacea Warren, 1914
- Centrarthra dentata Janse, 1938
- Centrarthra dicksoni Janse, 1938
- Centrarthra diffusa Janse, 1938
- Centrarthra fulvinotata Warren, 1914
- Centrarthra fulvitincta Warren, 1914
- Centrarthra furcivitta Hampson, 1909
- Centrarthra griseola Janse, 1938
- Centrarthra hexistigma Janse, 1938
- Centrarthra modesta Janse, 1938
- Centrarthra monochroma Janse, 1938
- Centrarthra nigrosignata Janse, 1938
- Centrarthra ochrealis Janse, 1938
- Centrarthra ossicolor Warren, 1914
- Centrarthra pallescens Warren, 1914
- Centrarthra pectinata Janse, 1938
- Centrarthra pygmaea Janse, 1938
- Centrarthra serricornis Janse, 1938
- Centrarthra similus Janse, 1938
- Centrarthra vansoni Janse, 1938
- Centrogone chlorochrysa Hampson, 1910
- Ceraptila reniferalis Guenée, 1854
- Cerocala contraria (Walker, 1865)
- Cerocala insana (Herrich-Schäffer, 1858)
- Cerocala vermiculosa Herrich-Schäffer, [1858]
- Cerynea endotrichalis Hampson, 1910
- Cerynea ignealis Hampson, 1910
- Cerynea thermesialis (Walker, 1866)
- Cerynea virescens Hampson, 1910
- Cetola costata Gaede, 1915
- Cetola radiata Hampson, 1909
- Chabuata rufilinea Hampson, 1910
- Chalciope delta (Boisduval, 1833)
- Chalciope erecta Hampson, 1902
- Chalciope pusilla (Holland, 1894)
- Chalestra podaresalis Walker, 1859
- Chasmina candida (Walker, 1865)
- Chasmina tibialis (Fabricius, 1775)
- Chitasida diplogramma (Hampson, 1905)
- Chlumetia albiapicata (Hampson, 1902)
- Chlumetia lichenosa (Hampson, 1902)
- Chlumetia polymorpha Hampson, 1920
- Chrysodeixis acuta (Walker, [1858])
- Chrysodeixis chalcites (Esper, 1789)
- Chrysodeixis eriosoma (Doubleday, 1843)
- Chrysozonata latiflavaria (Swinhoe, 1904)
- Chrysozonata purpurascens Hampson, 1914
- Chusaris venata Warren, 1914
- Chytonix brunnea Gaede, 1915
- Cnodifrontia dissimilis (Distant, 1898)
- Colbusa euclidica Walker, 1865
- Colpocheilopteryx operatrix (Wallengren, 1860)
- Compsotata elegantissima (Guenée, 1852)
- Condica capensis (Guenée, 1852)
- Condica conducta (Walker, 1857)
- Condica pauperata (Walker, 1858)
- Conicofrontia diamesa (Hampson, 1920)
- Conicofrontia sesamoides Hampson, 1902
- Conservula anthophyes (D. S. Fletcher, 1963)
- Conservula cinisigna de Joannis, 1906
- Conservula clarki Janse, 1937
- Conservula minor Holland, 1896
- Copifrontia purpurea (Gaede, 1915)
- Corgatha chionocraspis Hampson, 1918
- Corgatha odontota D. S. Fletcher, 1961
- Corgatha producta Hampson, 1902
- Corgatha regula Gaede, 1916
- Cortyta canescens Walker, 1858
- Cortyta diapera Hampson, 1913
- Cortyta phaeocyma Hampson, 1913
- Cosmia natalensis (Prout, 1925)
- Cosmia polymorpha Pinhey, 1968
- Crameria amabilis (Drury, 1773)
- Craniophora paragrapha (Felder, 1874)
- Craterestra definiens (Walker, 1857)
- Cretonia vegeta (Swinhoe, 1885)
- Crionica cervicornis (Fawcett, 1917)
- Crionica diversipennis Gaede, 1939
- Cryphia deceptura (Walker, 1865)
- Cryphia fulvifusa (Hampson, 1911)
- Ctenoplusia accentifera (Lefèbvre, 1827)
- Ctenoplusia dorfmeisteri (Felder & Rogenhofer, 1874)
- Ctenoplusia fracta (Walker, 1857)
- Ctenoplusia furcifera (Walker, 1857)
- Ctenoplusia limbirena (Guenée, 1852)
- Ctenoplusia phocea (Hampson, 1910)
- Ctenusa curvilinea Hampson, 1913
- Ctenusa varians (Wallengren, 1863)
- Cucullia albifuscata Janse, 1939
- Cucullia albilineata Gaede, 1934
- Cucullia argentivitta (Hampson, 1906)
- Cucullia atrimacula Hampson, 1909
- Cucullia brunnea Hampson, 1902
- Cucullia chrysota Hampson, 1902
- Cucullia clausa Walker, 1857
- Cucullia consimilis Felder & Rogenhofer, 1874
- Cucullia daedalis Janse, 1939
- Cucullia extricata (Walker, 1857)
- Cucullia hutchinsoni Hampson, 1902
- Cucullia inaequalis Janse, 1939
- Cucullia leucopis Hampson, 1906
- Cucullia minuta Möschler, 1883
- Cucullia nigrilinea Janse, 1939
- Cucullia nocturnalis Gaede, 1934
- Cucullia pallidicolor Janse, 1939
- Cucullia pallidistria Felder & Rogenhofer, 1874
- Cucullia perstriata Hampson, 1906
- Cucullia platti Prout, 1925
- Cucullia pusilla Möschler, 1883
- Cucullia pyrostrota (Hampson, 1906)
- Cucullia ruptifascia (Hampson, 1909)
- Cuneisigna cumamita (Bethune-Baker, 1911)
- Cuneisigna obstans (Walker, 1858)
- Cuneisigna rivulata (Hampson, 1902)
- Cyclopera bucephalidia (Hampson, 1902)
- Cyclopera galactiplaga (Hampson, 1902)

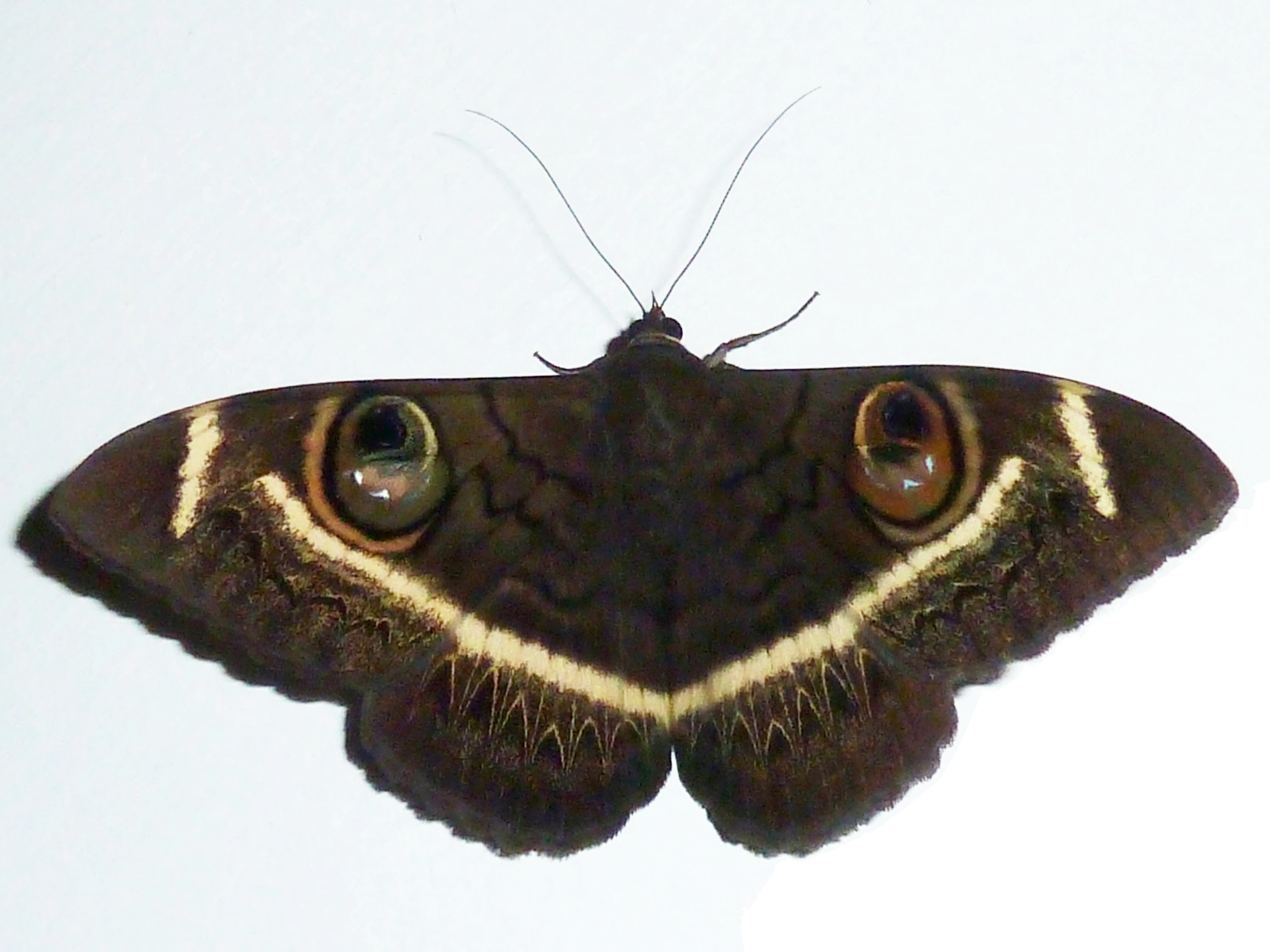
Cyligramma latona

- Cyligramma fluctuosa (Drury, 1773)
- Cyligramma joa Boisduval, 1833
- Cyligramma latona (Cramer, 1775)
- Cyligramma limacina (Guérin-Méneville, 1832)
- Cyligramma magus (Guérin-Méneville, [1844])
- Cytothymia absita (Felder & Rogenhofer, 1874)
- Dasypolia informis (Walker, 1857)
- Deinopa flavida Hampson, 1926
- Diaphone eumela (Stoll, 1781)
- Diaphone lampra Karsch, 1894
- Diargyria argyrogramma Krüger, 2005
- Diargyria argyrostolmus Krüger, 2009
- Diargyria argyhorion Krüger, 2009
- Diargyria argyrodeixis Krüger, 2009
- Diarsia sicca (Guenée, 1852)
- Dicerogastra furvilinea (Hampson, 1902)
- Dichromia erastrialis (Walker, 1866)
- Dichromia mesomelaena (Hampson, 1902)
- Dichromia mutilata (Strand, 1909)
- Dichromia semlikiensis (Prout, 1921)
- Digama aganais (Felder, 1874)
- Digama budonga Bethune-Baker, 1913
- Digama lithosioides Swinhoe, 1907
- Digama meridionalis Swinhoe, 1907
- Digama ostentata Distant, 1899
- Digama spilleri (Bethune-Baker, 1908)
- Dimorphinoctua cunhaensis Viette, 1952
- Dimorphinoctua goughensis D. S. Fletcher, 1963
- Diphtherocome verbenata (Distant, 1898)
- Disticta atava (Felder & Rogenhofer, 1874)
- Dysgnathia nigropunctata (Bethune-Baker, 1906)
- Dysgonia abnegans (Walker, 1858)
- Dysgonia angularis (Boisduval, 1833)
- Dysgonia chiliensis (Guenée, 1852)
- Dysgonia conjunctura (Walker, 1858)
- Dysgonia crameri Moore, 1885
- Dysgonia derogans (Walker, 1858)
- Dysgonia erectata (Hampson, 1902)
- Dysgonia joviana (Stoll, 1782)
- Dysgonia latifascia Warren, 1888
- Dysgonia properans (Walker, 1858)
- Dysgonia proxima (Hampson, 1902)
- Dysgonia torrida (Guenée, 1852)
- Dysgonia triplocyma (Hampson, 1913)
- Dysmilichia purpurascens Hampson, 1910
- Ecpatia dulcistriga (Walker, 1858)
- Ectochela aberrans Gaede, 1915
- Ectochela albilunata Gaede, 1915
- Ectochela canina (Felder, 1874)
- Ectochela flavilunata Gaede, 1915
- Ectochela nigrilineata Gaede, 1915
- Ectochela turneri Tams, 1930
- Ectolopha viridescens Hampson, 1902
- Effractilis effracta (Distant, 1898)
- Egnasia lioperas Prout, 1922
- Egnasia vicaria (Walker, 1866)
- Egybolis vaillantina (Stoll, 1790)
- Eldana saccharina
- Elyptron ethiopica (Hampson, 1909)
- Enispa albigrisea (Warren, 1914)
- Entomogramma grisea Wallengren, 1856
- Entomogramma pardus Guenée, 1852
- Epimeciodes abunda (Felder & Rogenhofer, 1874)
- Episparis leucotessellis Hampson, 1902
- Episparis xanthographa Hampson, 1926
- [[Erastria [in Geometridae] varipalpis]] Walker, 1865
- Ercheia subsignata (Walker, 1865)

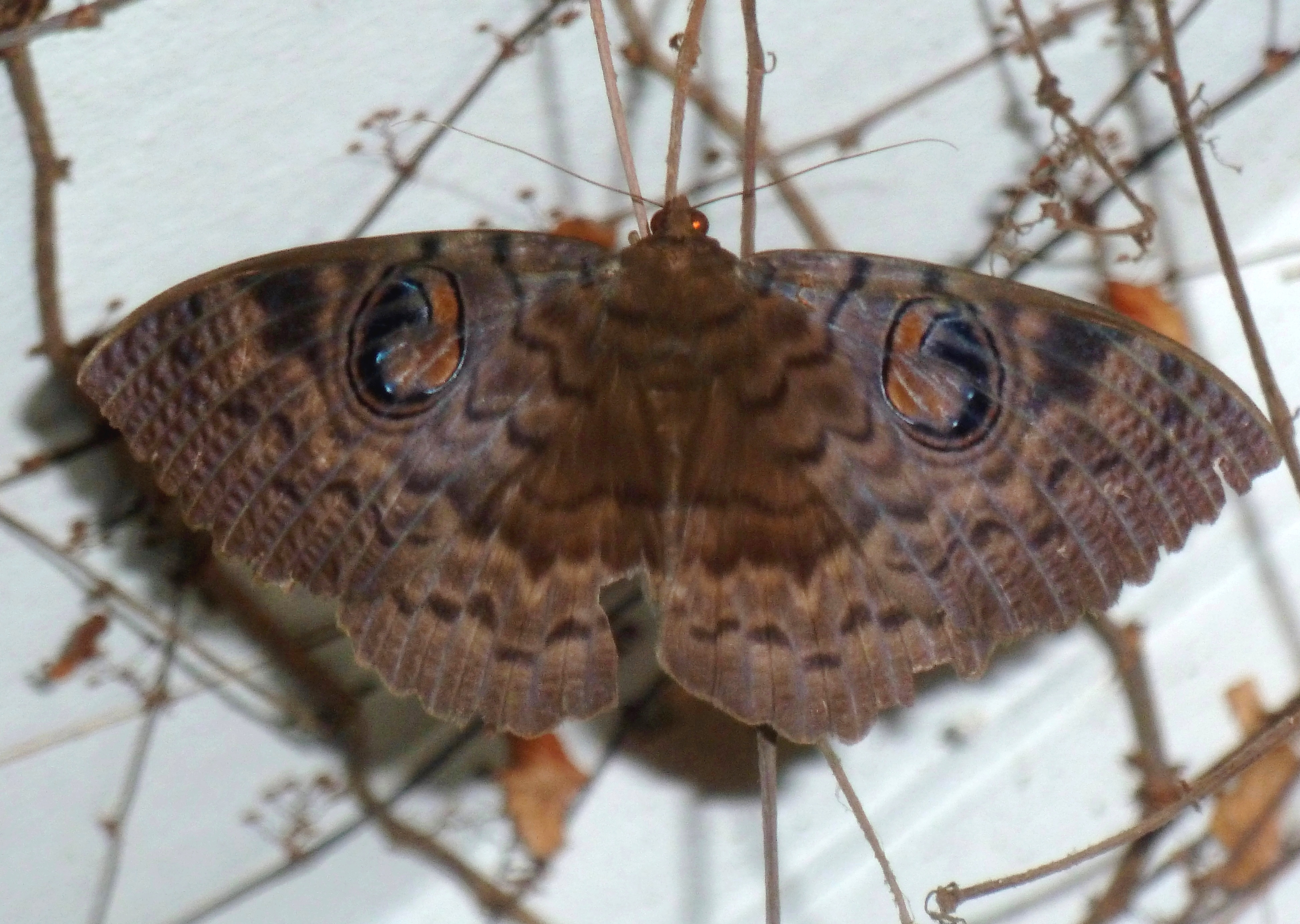
Erebus macrops

- Erebus atavistis (Hampson, 1913)
- Erebus macrops (Linnaeus, 1767)
- Erebus walkeri (Butler, 1875)
- Ericeia albangula (Saalmüller, 1880)
- Ericeia congregata (Walker, 1858)
- Ericeia congressa (Walker, 1858)
- Ericeia inangulata (Guenée, 1852)
- Ericeia sobria Walker, 1858
- Ethiopica polyastra Hampson, 1909
- Ethiopica vinosa (Hampson, 1902)
- Ethioterpia lichenea Janse, 1938
- Ethioterpia marmorata Janse, 1938
- Eublemma albivena (Hampson, 1910)
- Eublemma albivia Hampson, 1914
- Eublemma anachoresis (Wallengren, 1863)
- Eublemma apicata Distant, 1898
- Eublemma baccalix (Swinhoe, 1886)
- Eublemma bifasciata (Moore, 1881)
- Eublemma bipartita Hampson, 1902
- Eublemma bolinia (Hampson, 1902)
- Eublemma chionophlebia Hampson, 1910
- Eublemma cochylioides (Guenée, 1852)
- Eublemma daphoena Hampson, 1910
- Eublemma decora (Walker, 1869)
- Eublemma delicata (Felder & Rogenhofer, 1874)
- Eublemma ecthaemata Hampson, 1896
- Eublemma eupethecica Hampson, 1910
- Eublemma exigua (Walker, 1858)
- Eublemma flaviceps Hampson, 1902
- Eublemma flavicosta Hampson, 1910
- Eublemma flavida Hampson, 1902
- Eublemma flavinia (Hampson, 1902)
- Eublemma foedosa (Guenée, 1852)
- Eublemma fulvitermina Hampson, 1910
- Eublemma glaucizona Hampson, 1908
- Eublemma goniogramma Hampson, 1910
- Eublemma griseofimbriata Gaede, 1935
- Eublemma hemichiona Hampson, 1918
- Eublemma himmighoffeni (Millière, 1867)
- Eublemma kettlewelli Wiltshire, 1988
- Eublemma lentirosea Hampson, 1910
- Eublemma leucanitis Hampson, 1910
- Eublemma leucodicranon Grünberg, 1910
- Eublemma leucomelana Hampson, 1902
- Eublemma leuconeura Hampson, 1910
- Eublemma melabasis Hampson, 1914
- Eublemma melanodonta Hampson, 1910
- Eublemma mesophaea Hampson, 1910
- Eublemma minima (Guenée, 1852)
- Eublemma nigrivitta Hampson, 1902
- Eublemma ochrobasis Hampson, 1910
- Eublemma ornatula (Felder & Rogenhofer, 1874)
- Eublemma parva (Hübner, [1808])
- Eublemma penicillata Hampson, 1902
- Eublemma plumbosa Distant, 1899
- Eublemma postrosea Gaede, 1935
- Eublemma postrufa Hampson, 1914
- Eublemma punctilinea Hampson, 1902
- Eublemma pyrastis Hampson, 1910
- Eublemma ragusana (Freyer, 1844)
- Eublemma rivula (Moore, 1882)
- Eublemma rubripuncta (Hampson, 1902)
- Eublemma rufimixta Hampson, 1918
- Eublemma sabia (Felder & Rogenhofer, 1874)
- Eublemma scitula (Rambur, 1833)
- Eublemma sperans (Felder & Rogenhofer, 1874)
- Eublemma staudingeri (Wallengren, 1875)
- Eublemma stictilinea Hampson, 1910
- Eublemma stygiochroa Hampson, 1910
- Eublemma stygiodonta Hampson, 1910
- Eublemma therma Hampson, 1910
- Eublemma thermochroa Hampson, 1910
- Eublemma thermosticta Hampson, 1910
- Eublemma titanica Hampson, 1910
- Eublemma uninotata Hampson, 1902
- Eublemmistis chlorozonea Hampson, 1902
- Eublemmoides apicimacula (Mabille, 1880)

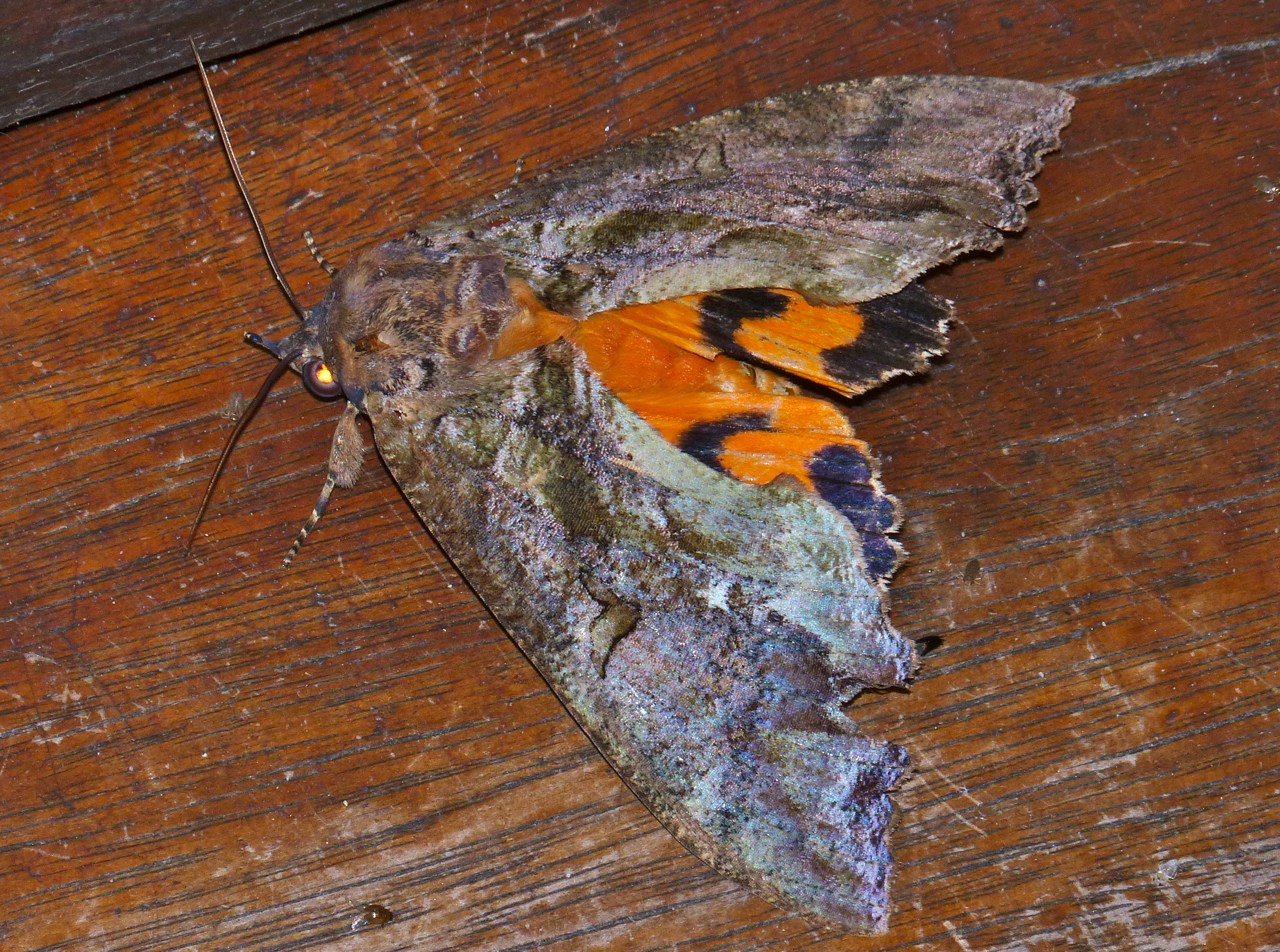
Eudocima phalonia

- Eudocima cajeta (Cramer, 1775)
- Eudocima divitiosa (Walker, 1869)
- Eudocima fullonia (Clerck, 1764)
- Eudocima materna (Linnaeus, 1767)
- Eulocastra aethiops (Distant, 1898)
- Eulocastra hypotaenia (Wallengren, 1860)
- Eumichtis rubrimixta Hampson, 1906
- Euonychodes albivenata Warren, 1914
- Euplexia augens Felder & Rogenhofer, 1874
- Euplexia catephiodes Hampson, 1908
- Euplexia nyassana Gaede, 1915
- Eustrotia albibasis (Hampson, 1902)
- Eustrotia albifascia (Walker, 1865)
- Eustrotia albifissa (Hampson, 1902)
- Eustrotia angulissima Gaede, 1935
- Eustrotia bryophilina Hampson, 1910
- Eustrotia catoxantha Hampson, 1910
- Eustrotia decissima (Walker, 1865)
- Eustrotia genuflexa (Hampson, 1902)
- Eustrotia megalena (Mabille, 1900)
- Eustrotia olivula (Guenée, 1852)
- Eustrotia schencki Strand, 1912

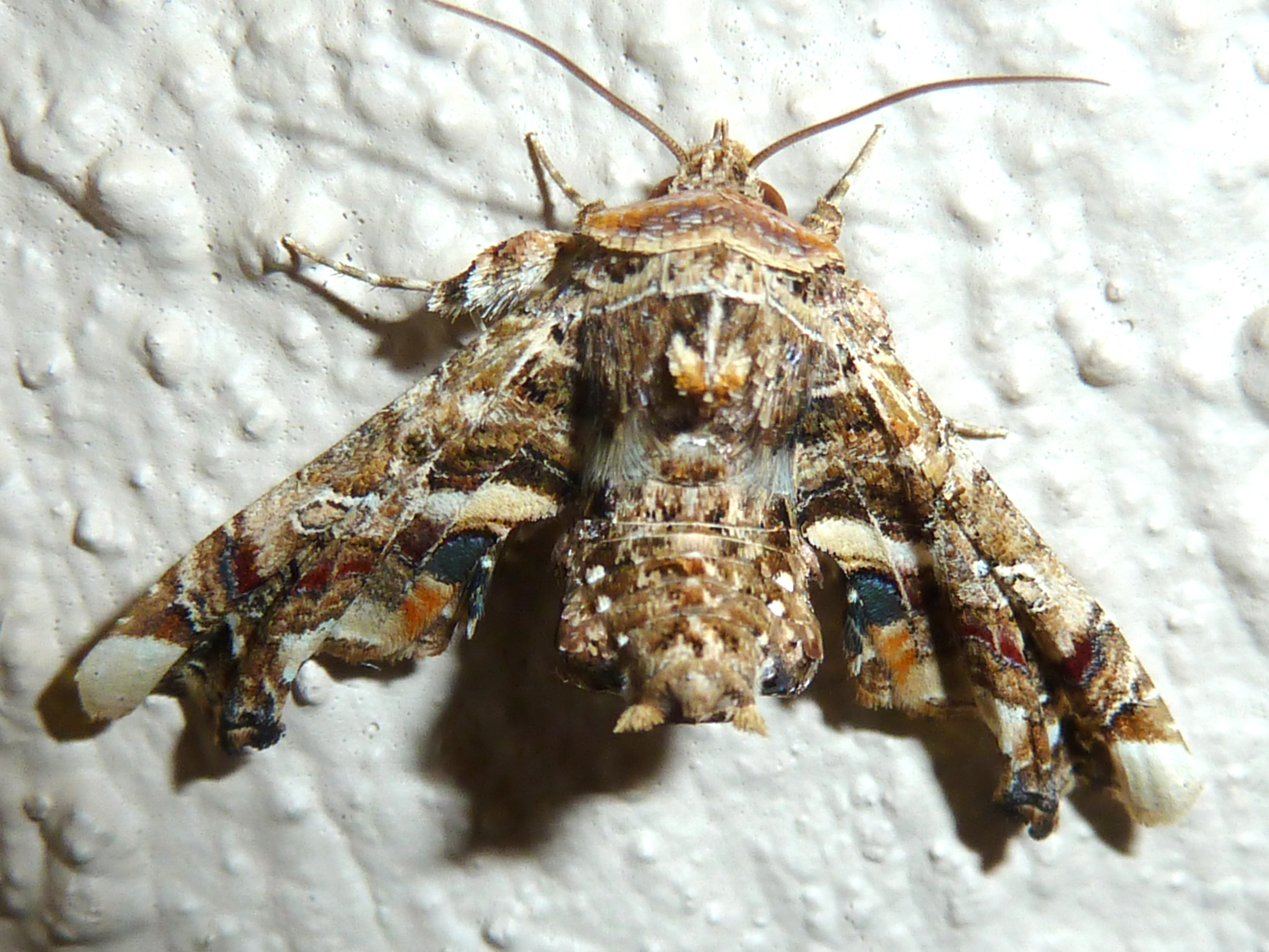
Eutelia adulatrix

- Eutelia adulatrix (Hübner, 1813)
- Eutelia amatrix Walker, 1858
- Eutelia blandiatrix (Guenée, 1852)
- Eutelia bowkeri (Felder & Rogenhofer, 1874)
- Eutelia callichroma (Distant, 1901)
- Eutelia catephioides (Guenée, 1852)
- Eutelia discitriga Walker, 1865
- Eutelia favillatrix (Guenée, 1852)
- Eutelia fulvigrisea Warren, 1914
- Eutelia gilvicolor Mabille, 1900
- Eutelia grisescens Hampson, 1916
- Eutelia histrio (Saalmüller, 1880)
- Eutelia leighi Hampson, 1905
- Eutelia leucodelta Hampson, 1905
- Eutelia mima Prout, 1925
- Eutelia ocellaria Berio, 1966
- Eutelia ocularis (Saalmüller, 1891)
- Eutelia polychorda Hampson, 1902
- Eutelia rivata Hampson, 1902
- Eutelia subrubens (Mabille, 1890)
- Eutelia symphonica Hampson, 1902
- Eutelia violescens (Hampson, 1912)
- Euterpiodes pienaari (Distant, 1898)
- Euxoa albiorbis Hampson, 1909
- Euxoa hendersoni Pinhey, 1968
- Euxootera bilacteata (Berio, 1962)

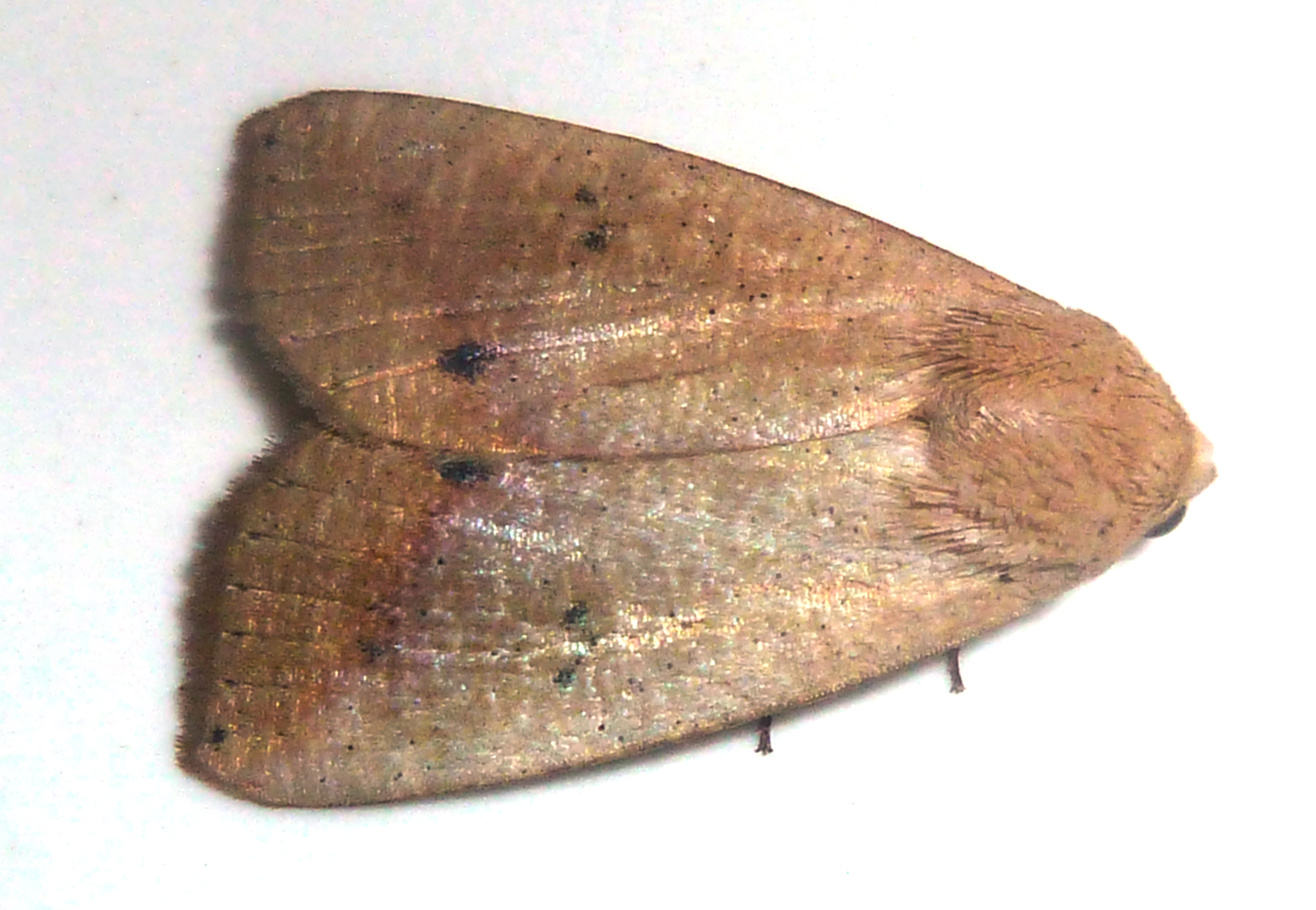
Exophyla multistriata

- Exophyla molybdea Hampson, 1926
- Exophyla multistriata Hampson, 1910
- Exophyla platti Prout, 1925
- Exophyla poliotis (Hampson, 1902)
- Facidia vacillans (Walker, 1858)
- Facidina semifimbria (Walker, 1858)
- Feliniopsis africana (Schaus & Clements, 1893)
- Feliniopsis breviuscula (Walker, 1858)
- Feliniopsis connivens (Felder & Rogenhofer, 1874)
- Feliniopsis consummata (Walker, 1857)
- Feliniopsis gueneei (Laporte, 1973)
- Feliniopsis hosplitoides (Laporte, 1979)
- Feliniopsis indigna (Herrich-Schäffer, [1854])
- Feliniopsis nigribarbata (Hampson, 1908)
- Feliniopsis thoracica (Walker, 1858)
- Fodina arctioides Walker, 1865
- Fodina embolophora Hampson, 1902
- Fodina hypercompoides Walker, 1865
- Fulvarba fulvescens (Hampson, 1910)
- Gesonia stictigramma Hampson, 1926
- Gnamptogyia diagonalis Hampson, 1910
- Gracilodes caffra Guenée, 1852
- Gracilodes nysa Guenée, 1852
- Grammarctia bilinea (Walker, 1865)

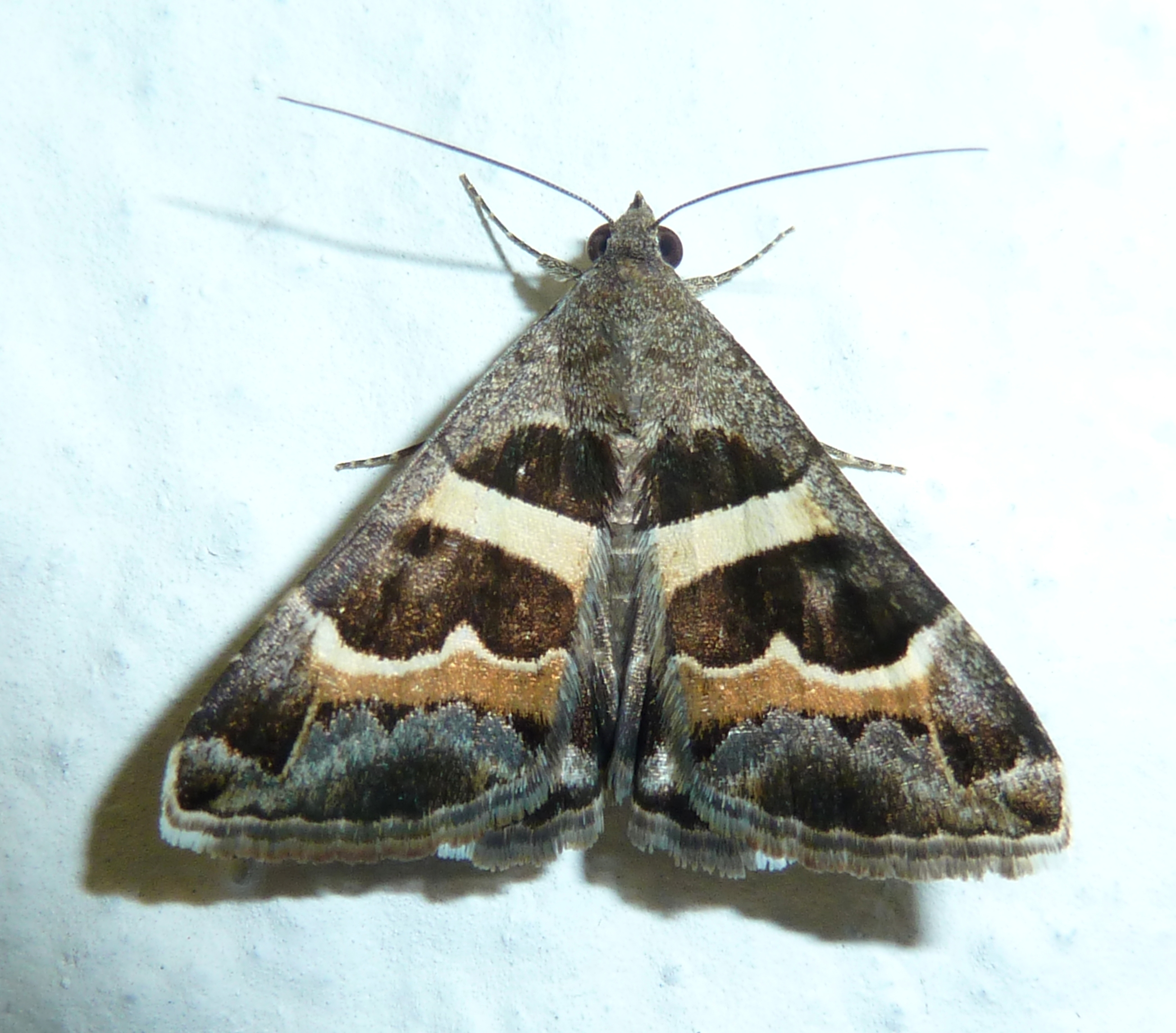
Grammodes stolida

- Grammodes afrocculta Berio, 1956
- Grammodes bifasciata (Petagna, 1787)
- Grammodes congenita Walker, 1858
- Grammodes euclidioides Guenée, 1852
- Grammodes exclusiva Pagenstecher, 1907
- Grammodes geometrica (Fabricius, 1775)
- Grammodes monodonta Berio, 1956
- Grammodes stolida (Fabricius, 1775)
- Grammoscelis leuconeura Hampson, 1906
- Graphania atavistis (Hampson, 1902)
- Hadena bulgeri (Felder & Rogenhofer, 1874)
- Hadena fusifasciata Walker, 1865
- Hadena mamestroides Walker, 1865
- Hadena ruptilinea (Walker, 1857)
- Hadjina carcaroda (Distant, 1901)
- Hadjina obscura Hampson, 1918
- Halochroa eudela D. S. Fletcher, 1963
- Helicoverpa armigera (Hübner, [1808])
- Helicoverpa assulta (Guenée, 1852)
- Helicoverpa toddi Hardwick, 1965
- Heliocheilus biocularis (Gaede, 1915)
- Heliocheilus stigmatia (Hampson, 1903)
- Heliophisma catocalina Holland, 1894
- Heliophisma klugii (Boisduval, 1833)
- Heliothis charmione (Stoll, 1790)
- Heliothis conifera (Hampson, 1913)
- Heliothis flavescens (Janse, 1917)
- Heliothis fuscimacula (Janse, 1917)
- Heliothis pauliani Viette, 1959
- Heliothis scutuligera Guenée, 1852
- Heliothis xanthiata Walker, 1865
- Hemiceratoides hieroglyphica (Saalmüller, 1891)
- Hemiceratoides sittaca (Karsch, 1896)
- Heraclia aemulatrix (Westwood, 1881)
- Heraclia africana (Butler, 1875)
- Heraclia butleri (Walker, 1869)
- Heraclia durbania (Stoneham, 1964)
- Heraclia geryon (Fabricius, 1781)
- Heraclia superba (Butler, 1875)
- Herpeperas barnesi Pinhey, 1968
- Herpeperas rudis (Walker, 1865)
- Hespagarista echione (Boisduval, 1847)
- Heteropalpia vetusta (Walker, 1865)
- Hiccoda nigripalpis (Walker, 1866)
- Hipoepa fractalis (Guenée, 1854)
- Holocryptis erosides (Hampson, 1902)
- Hondryches phalaeniformis (Guenée, 1852)
- Honeyia clearchus (Fawcett, 1916)
- Honeyia tertia Hacker & Fibiger, 2007
- Hyamia subterminalis Walker, 1866
- Hydrillodes bryophiloides (Butler, 1876)
- Hydrillodes lentalis Guenée, 1854
- Hydrillodes uliginosalis Guenée, 1854

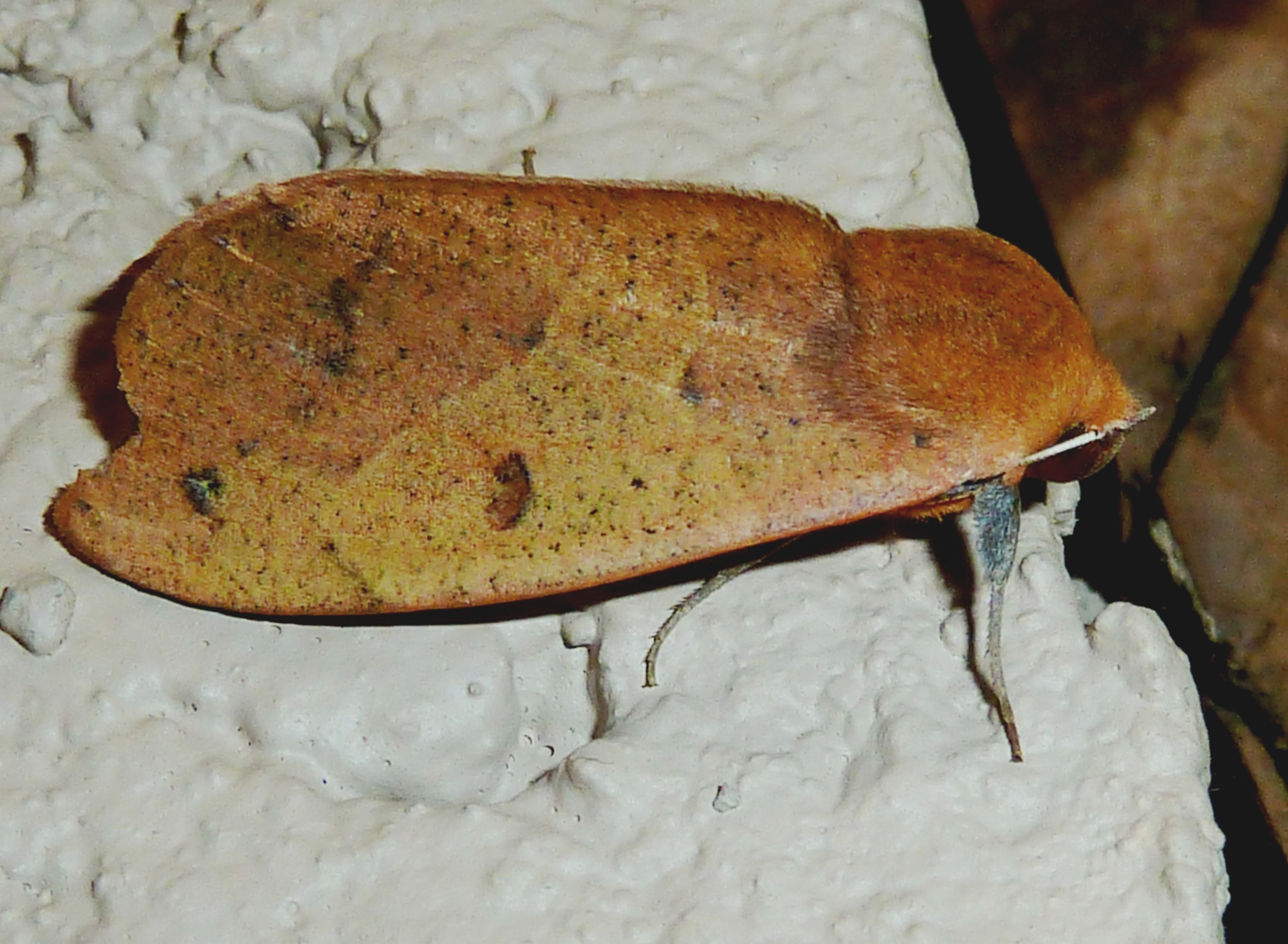
Hypanua roseitincta

- Hypanua roseitincta Hampson, 1918
- Hypanua xylina (Distant, 1898)
- Hypena abyssinialis Guenée, 1854
- Hypena cherylae Lödl, 1995
- Hypena cinctipedalis Zeller, 1852
- Hypena fusculalis Saalmüller, 1891
- Hypena holophaea Hampson, 1902
- Hypena jussalis Walker, 1859
- Hypena laceratalis Walker, 1859
- Hypena laetalimaior Lödl, 1994
- Hypena laetalis Walker, 1859
- Hypena lividalis (Hübner, 1790)
- Hypena melanistis Hampson, 1902
- Hypena neoplyta Prout, 1925
- Hypena obacerralis Walker, [1859]
- Hypena polycyma Hampson, 1902
- Hypena puncticosta Prout, 1925
- Hypena senialis Guenée, 1854
- Hypena tetrasticta Hampson, 1910
- Hypena varialis Walker, 1866
- Hypena vulgatalis Walker, 1859
- Hypercodia wheeleri Pinhey, 1968
- Hypocala bohemani (Wallengren, 1856)
- Hypocala deflorata (Fabricius, 1794)
- Hypocala genuina (Wallengren, 1856)
- Hypocala plumicornis Guenée, 1852
- Hypocala rostrata (Fabricius, 1794)
- Hypoplexia algoa (Felder & Rogenhofer, 1874)
- Hypoplexia conjuncta Hampson, 1908
- Hypoplexia externa (Walker, 1857)
- Hypoplexia melanica Hampson, 1911
- Hypoplexia varicolor (Warren, 1914)
- Hypopyra capensis Herrich-Schäffer, 1854
- Hypopyra guttata Wallengren, 1856
- Hyposada hydrocampata (Guenée, 1858)
- Hypotacha nigristria (Hampson, 1902)
- Hypotacha retracta (Hampson, 1902)
- Hypotype nigridentata (Hampson, 1902)
- Hypotype scotomista (Hampson, 1902)
- Iambia brunnea Warren, 1914
- Iambia inferalis Walker, 1863
- Iambia jansei Berio, 1966
- Iambia melanochlora (Hampson, 1902)
- Iambia transversa (Moore, 1882)
- Iambiodes nyctostola Hampson, 1918
- Idia auge (Hampson, 1902)
- Idia gigantalis (Hampson, 1902)
- Idia pulverea (Hampson, 1902)
- Interdelta mediafricana Berio, 1964
- Isadelphina vinacea (Hampson, 1902)
- Janseodes melanospila (Guenée, 1852)
- Klugeana philoxalis Geertsema, 1990
- Klugeana swartlandensis Geertsema, 1990
- Lacera alope (Cramer, 1780)
- Leiorhynx argentifascia Hampson, 1902
- Leoniloma convergens Hampson, 1926
- Leucania acutangula (Gaede, 1816)
- Leucania amens Guenée, 1852
- Leucania apparata Wallengren, 1875
- Leucania atrimacula Hampson, 1902
- Leucania baziyae Möschler, 1883
- Leucania hamata Wallengren, 1856
- Leucania insularis Butler, 1880
- Leucania insulicola Guenée, 1852
- Leucania interciliata Hampson, 1902
- Leucania internata Möschler, 1883
- Leucania loreyi (Duponchel, 1827)
- Leucania melanostrota (Hampson, 1905)
- Leucania melianoides Möschler, 1883
- Leucania murcida (Wallengren, 1875)
- Leucania nebulosa Hampson, 1902
- Leucania nigrisparsa Hampson, 1902
- Leucania persecta (Hampson, 1905)
- Leucania phaea Hampson, 1902
- Leucania phaeochroa (Hampson, 1905)
- Leucania polyrabda (Hampson, 1905)
- Leucania prominens (Walker, 1856)
- Leucania punctulata Wallengren, 1856
- Leucania quadricuspidata Wallengren, 1856
- Leucania rhabdophora Hampson, 1902
- Leucania rubrescens (Hampson, 1905)
- Leucania sarca Hampson, 1902
- Leucania tacuna Felder & Rogenhofer, 1874
- Leucania uncinata Gaede, 1916
- Leucania usta Hampson, 1902
- Leucania ustata (Hampson, 1907)
- Leucania zeae (Duponchel, 1827)
- Leucochlaena aenigma Pinhey, 1968
- Leucotrachea leucomelanica Janse, 1937
- Leucotrachea melanobasis (Hampson, 1902)
- Leucotrachea melanodonta (Hampson, 1908)
- Leucotrachea melanoleuca (Hampson, 1902)
- Leucovis alba (Rothschild, 1897)
- Leumicamia leucosoma (Felder & Rogenhofer, 1874)
- Lipatephia illegitima (Wallengren, 1875)
- Lithacodia binorbis (Hampson, 1902)
- Lithacodia blandula (Guenée, 1862)
- Lithacodia caffristis Hampson, 1910
- Lithacodia normalis Hampson, 1910
- Lithacodia varicolora (Hampson, 1902)
- Lophocyttarra phoenicoxantha Hampson, 1914

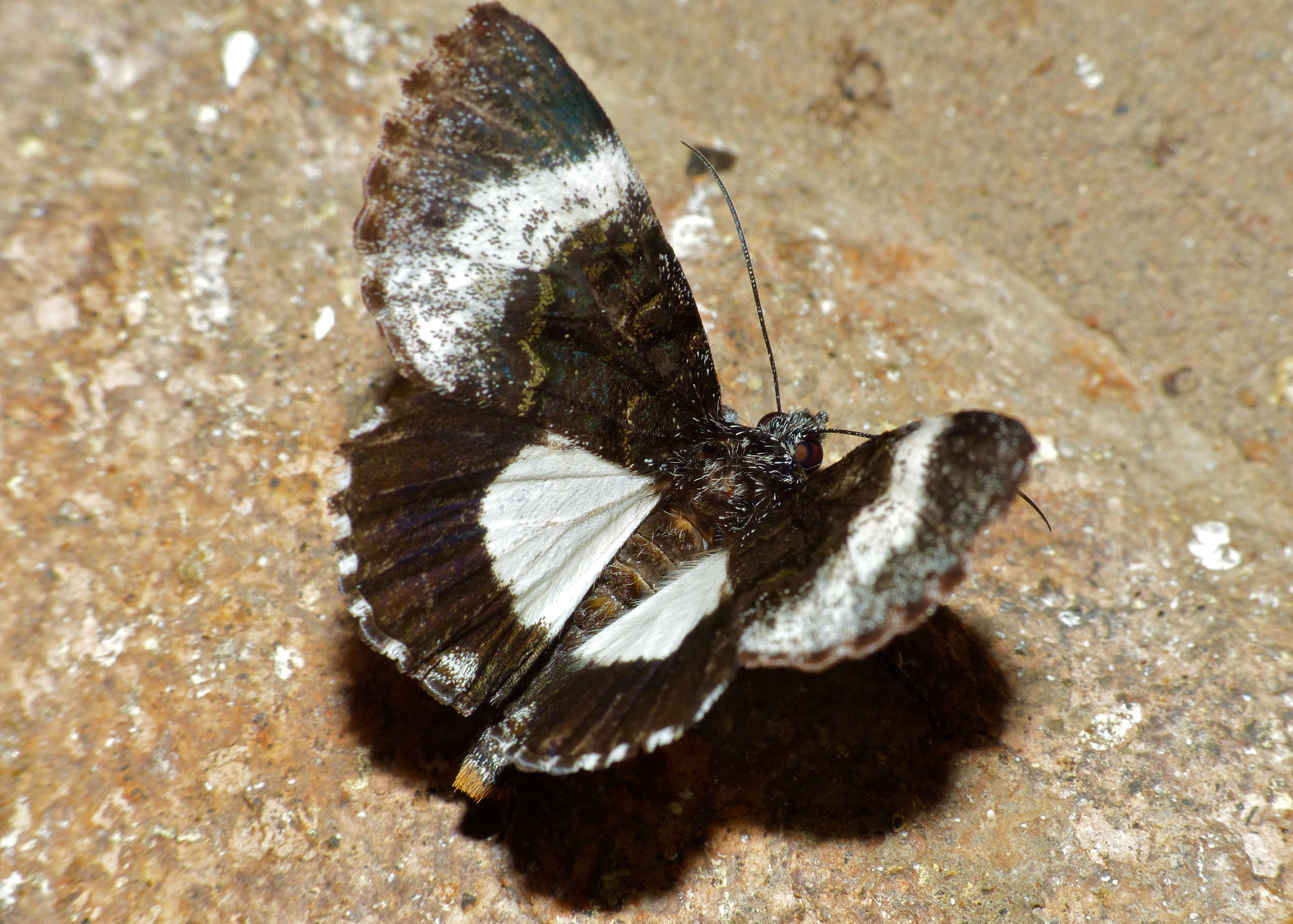
Lophonotidia nocturna

- Lophonotidia melanoleuca Janse, 1937
- Lophonotidia nocturna Hampson, 1901
- Lophoptera litigiosa (Boisduval, 1833)
- Lophoruza semiscripta (Mabille, 1893)
- Lophotarsia ochroprocta Hampson, 1902
- Lophotarsia uniformis Berio, 1966
- Lophotavia globulipes (Walker, 1865)
- Loxioda ochrota (Hampson, 1909)
- Lycophotia ecvinacea Hampson, 1903
- Lycophotia melanephra Hampson, 1909
- Lycophotia postventa (Geyer, 1837)
- Lygephila salax (Guenée, 1852)
- Mamestra catephiodes Walker, 1865
- Manga melanodonta (Hampson, 1910)
- Marathyssa albidisca (Hampson, 1905)
- Marathyssa cistellatrix (Wallengren, 1860)
- Marathyssa cuneata (Saalmüller, 1891)
- Marcipa alternata Gaede, 1939
- Marcipa carcassoni Pelletier, 1975
- Marcipa heterospila (Hampson, 1910)
- Marcipa pyramidalis (Hampson, 1910)
- Masalia disticta (Hampson, 1902)
- Masalia flavistrigata (Hampson, 1903)
- Masalia galatheae (Wallengren, 1856)
- Masalia transvaalica (Distant, 1902)
- Massaga virescens Butler, 1874
- Matopo scutulata Janse, 1917
- Matopo typica Distant, 1898
- Maxera atripunctata (Hampson, 1910)
- Maxera brachypecten Hampson, 1926
- Maxera digoniata (Hampson, 1902)
- Maxera marchalii (Boisduval, 1833)
- Maxera zygia (Wallengren, 1863)
- Mazuca elegantissima Janse, 1939
- Mazuca roseistriga D. S. Fletcher, 1963
- Mazuca strigicincta Walker, 1866
- Melanephia metarhabdota Hampson, 1926
- Melanephia nigrescens (Wallengren, 1856)
- Meliaba pelopsalis Walker, 1859
- Melipotis amphix (Cramer, 1777)
- Melipotis mimica (Gaede, 1939)
- Meneptera diopis (Hampson, 1905)

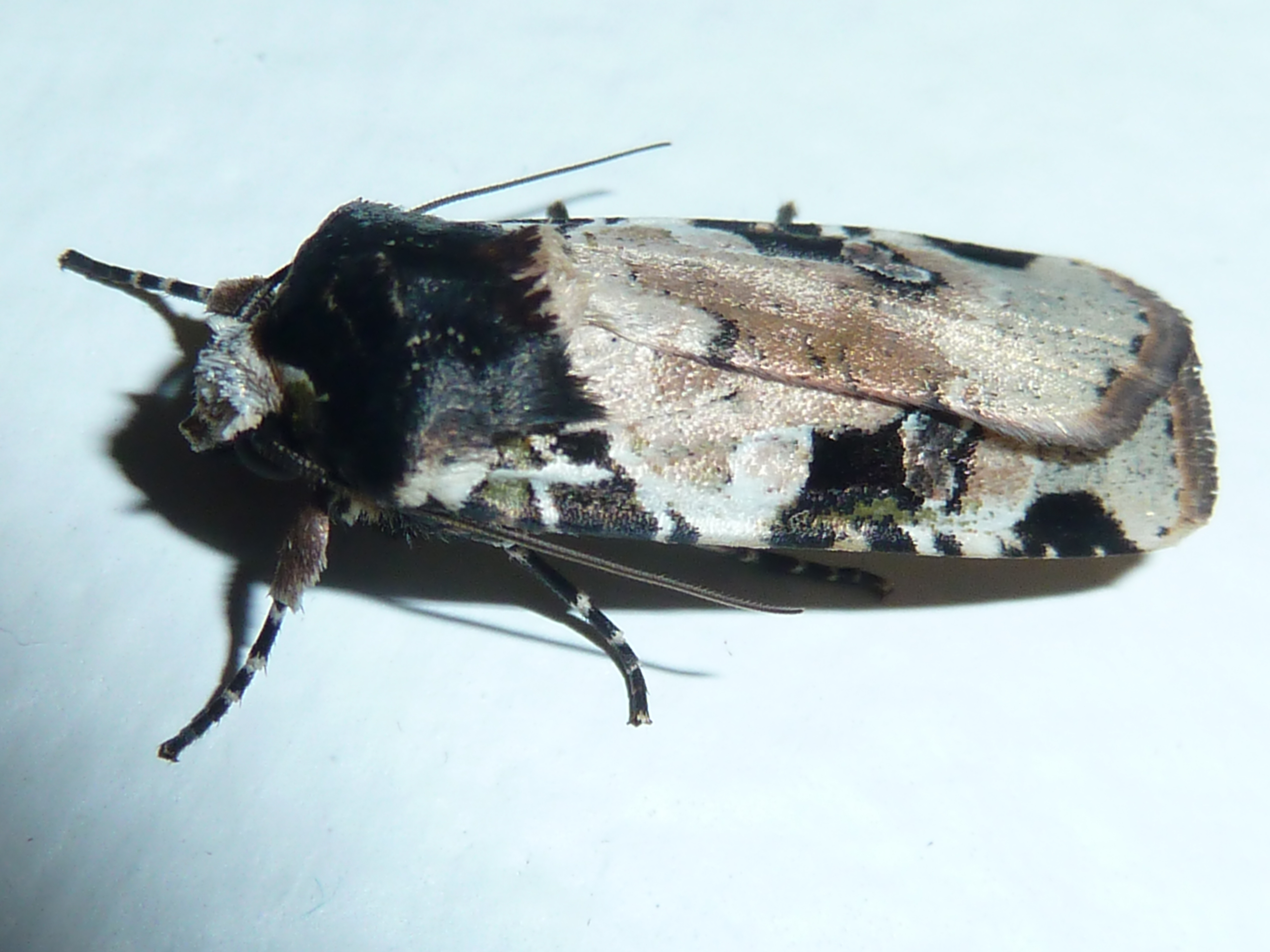
Mentaxya albifrons

- Mentaxya albifrons (Geyer, 1837)
- Mentaxya atritegulata (Hampson, 1902)
- Mentaxya cumulata (Walker, 1865)
- Mentaxya fletcheri (Berio, 1955)
- Mentaxya ignicollis (Walker, 1857)
- Mentaxya indigna (Herrich-Schäffer, 1854)
- Mentaxya muscosa Geyer, 1837
- Mentaxya percurvata (Berio, 1955)
- Mentaxya rimosa (Guenée, 1852)
- Mepantadrea simia (Saalmüller, 1891)
- Mesogenea persinuosa Hampson, 1910
- Mesogenea varians Hampson, 1902
- Mesosciera picta Hampson, 1926
- Metachrostis decora (Walker, 1869)
- Metagarista triphaenoides Walker, 1854
- Micragrotis intendens (Walker, 1857)
- Micragrotis interstriata (Hampson, 1902)
- Micragrotis marwitzi Gaede, 1935
- Micragrotis puncticostata (Hampson, 1902)
- Micragrotis rufescens Hampson, 1903
- Micragrotis strigibasis (Hampson, 1902)
- Mimasura innotata Hampson, 1910
- Mimasura tripunctoides Poole, 1989
- Mimasura unipuncta (Hampson, 1902)
- Mimleucania perstriata Hampson, 1909
- Miniodes discolor Guenée, 1852
- Minucia confinis (Wallengren, 1856)
- Minucia finitima (Wallengren, 1856)
- Minucia maculata (Wallengren, 1856)
- Mionides lichenea Hampson, 1902
- Mitrophrys ansorgei (Rothschild, 1897)
- Mitrophrys latreillii (Herrich-Schäffer, 1853)
- Mitrophrys magna (Walker, 1854)
- Mocis conveniens (Walker, 1858)
- Mocis frugalis (Fabricius, 1775)
- Mocis mayeri (Boisduval, 1833)
- Mocis mutuaria (Walker, 1858)
- Mocis repanda (Fabricius, 1794)
- Myalila typica Strand, 1909
- Mythimna caelebs (Grünberg, 1910)
- Mythimna combinata (Walker, 1857)
- Mythimna natalensis (Butler, 1875)
- Mythimna poliastis (Hampson, 1902)
- Naarda flavisignata Vári, 1962
- Naarda leucopis Hampson, 1902
- Naarda melanomma Hampson, 1902
- Naarda xanthopis Hampson, 1902
- Nagia amplificans (Walker, 1858)
- Nagia gravipes Walker, 1858
- Nagia linteola (Guenée, 1852)
- Nagia melipotica Hampson, 1926
- Nagia natalensis (Hampson, 1902)
- Nagia sacerdotis Hampson, 1926
- Nagia subalbida Hampson, 1926
- Namangana atripars Hampson, 1909
- Namangana thyatirodes Hampson, 1918
- Neochrostis diplogramma Hampson, 1902
- Neocucullia albisignata Janse, 1939
- Neogalea sunia (Guenée, 1852)
- Nodaria brachialis (Zeller, 1852)
- Nodaria cornicalis (Fabricius, 1794)
- Nodaria externalis Guenée, 1854
- Nodaria melaleuca Hampson, 1902
- Nodaria nodosalis (Herrich-Schäffer, 1851)
- Nonagria intestata Walker, 1856
- Nyodes acatharta (Hampson, 1913)
- Nyodes lutescens (Herrich-Schäffer, 1854)
- Nyodes prasinodes (Prout, 1921)
- Nyodes punctata (Gaede, 1934)
- Ochrocalama xanthia (Hampson, 1905)
- Ochropleura leucogaster (Freyer, 1831)
- Ochropleura vicaria Walker, 1857
- Odontestra conformis Hampson, 1918
- Odontestra vittigera (Hampson, 1902)
- Odontoretha featheri Hampson, 1916
- Oedebasis ovipennis Hampson, 1902
- Oediblemma trogoptera Hampson, 1918
- Oglasa arcuata (Fabricius, 1787)
- Oglasa confluens Hampson, 1926
- Oglasa nana (Walker, 1869)
- Oglasa renilinea Gaede, 1939
- Oglasa tamsi Gaede, 1939
- Ogovia pudens (Holland, 1894)
- Oligia ambigua (Walker, 1858)
- Oligia confusa Janse, 1937
- Oligia instructa (Walker, 1865)
- Oligia intermedia Berio, 1976
- Oligia subambigua (D. S. Fletcher, 1961)
- Omphalestra mesoglauca (Hampson, 1902)
- Omphalestra mesomelana (Hampson, 1902)
- Oncotibialis flava Janse, 1938
- Ophiodes (preocc.) wahlbergi Wallengren, 1856
- Ophisma exuleata Möschler, 1883
- Ophisma lunulifera Walker, 1865
- Ophiusa ambigua (Gerstaecker, 1871)
- Ophiusa coronata (Fabricius, 1775)
- Ophiusa dianaris (Guenée, 1852)
- Ophiusa dilecta Walker, 1865
- Ophiusa finifascia (Walker, 1858)
- Ophiusa mejanesi (Guenée, 1852)
- Ophiusa nocturnia Hampson, 1902
- Ophiusa salita Distant, 1898
- Ophiusa selenaris (Guenée, 1852)

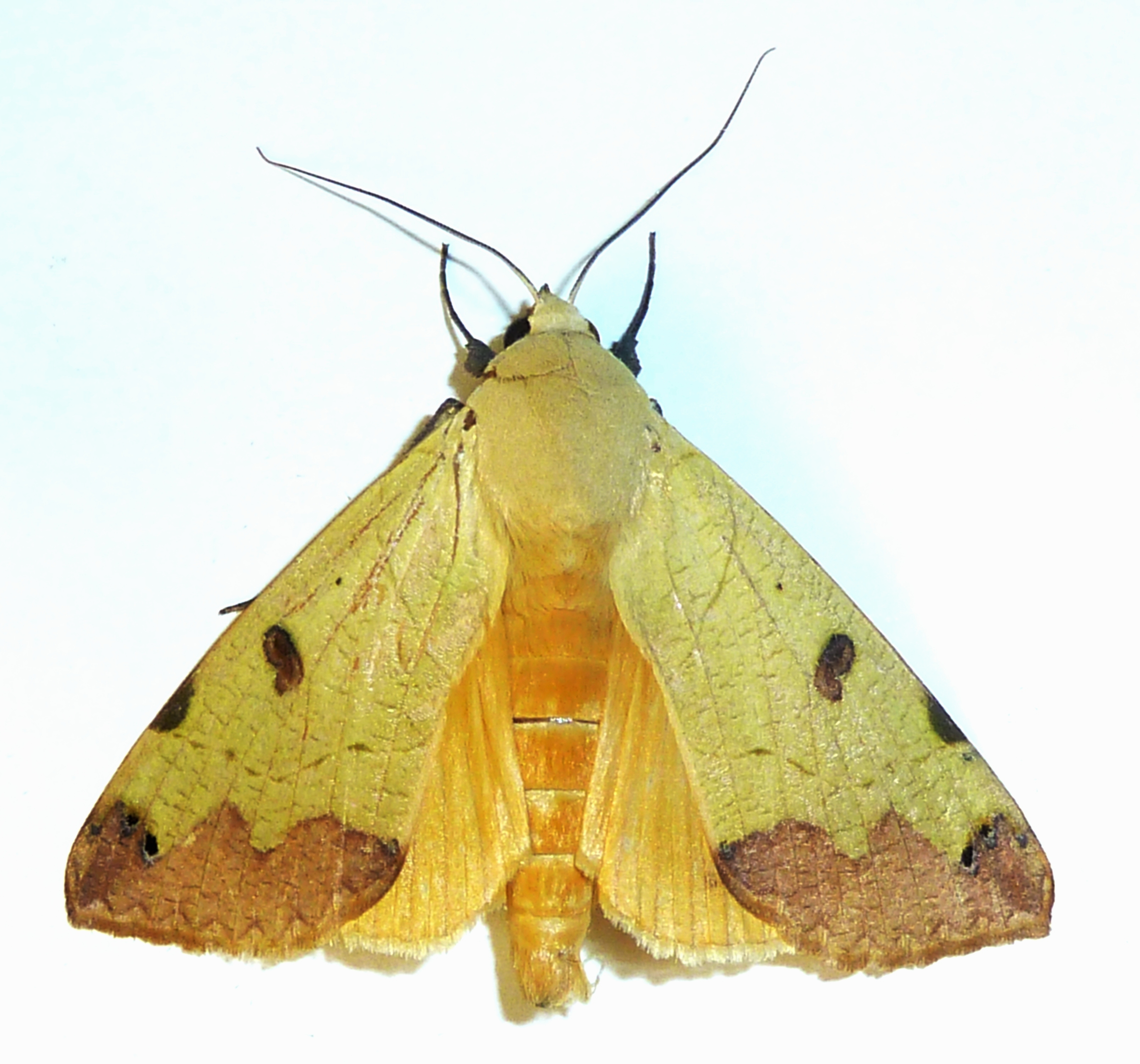
Ophiusa tirhaca

- Ophiusa tirhaca (Cramer, 1777)
- Ophiusa tumiditermina Hampson, 1910
- Ophiusa violascens Hampson, 1902
- Ophiusa violisparsa (L. B. Prout, 1919)
- Oraesia albescens Gaede, 1940
- Oraesia emarginata (Fabricius, 1794)
- Oraesia provocans Walker, [1858]
- Oraesia wintgensi (Strand, 1909)
- Oria flavescens (Hampson, 1902)
- Oruza latifera (Walker, 1869)
- Ovios capensis (Herrich-Schäffer, 1854)
- Ozarba abscissa (Walker, 1858)
- Ozarba accincta (Distant, 1898)
- Ozarba acclivis (Felder & Rogenhofer, 1874)
- Ozarba albimarginata (Hampson, 1896)
- Ozarba atrifera Hampson, 1910
- Ozarba bicoloria Gaede, 1935
- Ozarba binorbis Hampson, 1910
- Ozarba bipartita (Hampson, 1902)
- Ozarba chionoperas Hampson, 1918
- Ozarba consanguis (Hampson, 1902)
- Ozarba contempta (Walker, 1858)
- Ozarba corniculans (Wallengren, 1860)
- Ozarba corniculantis Berio, 1947
- Ozarba cryptochrysea (Hampson, 1902)
- Ozarba cyanopasta Hampson, 1910
- Ozarba densa (Walker, 1865)
- Ozarba fasciata (Wallengren, 1860)
- Ozarba festiva Berio, 1950
- Ozarba flavipennis Hampson, 1910
- Ozarba heliastis (Hampson, 1902)

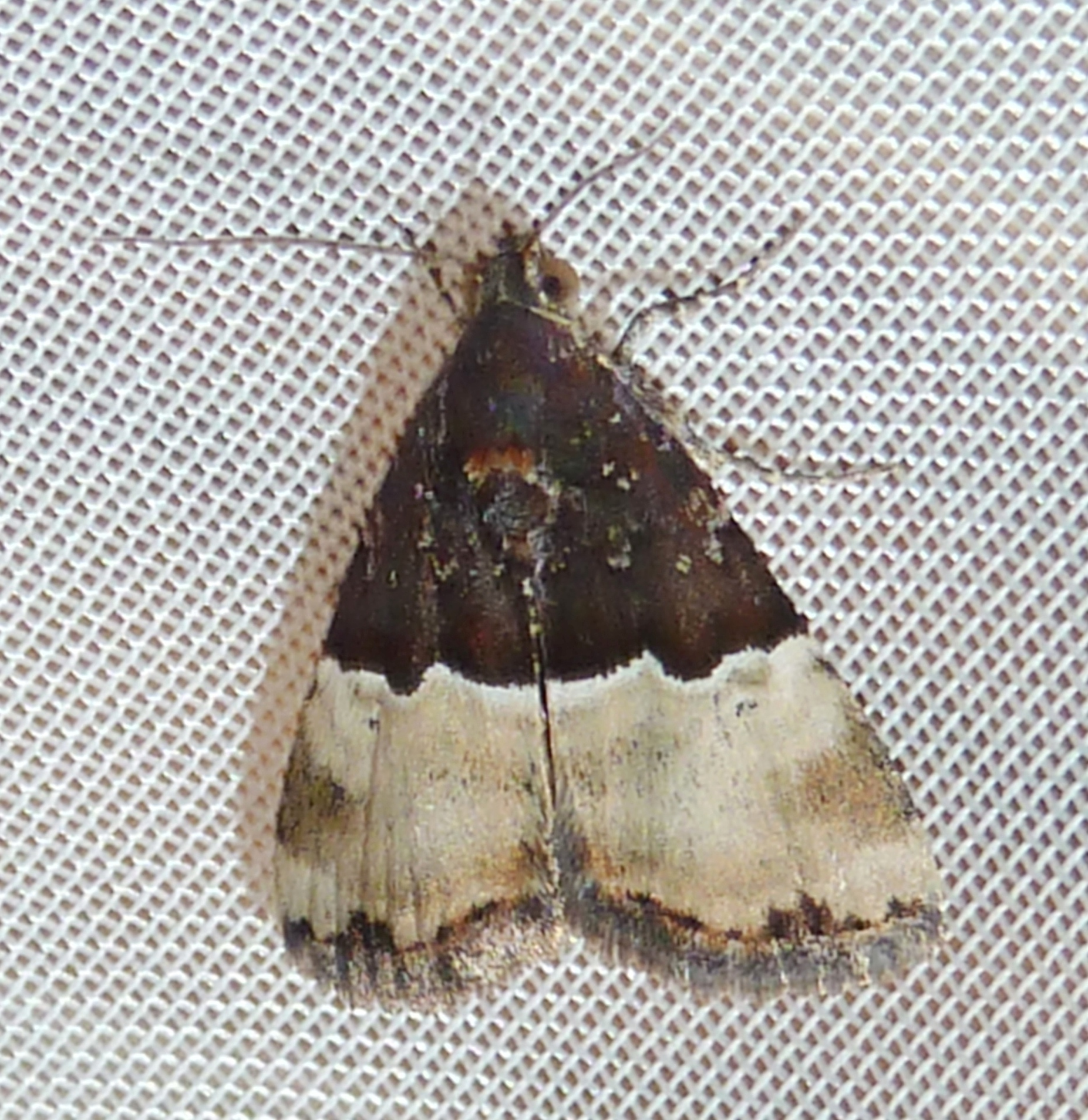
Ozarba hemiochra

- Ozarba hemiochra Hampson, 1910
- Ozarba hemipolia Hampson, 1910
- Ozarba hypoxantha (Wallengren, 1860)
- Ozarba illimitata Warren, 1914
- Ozarba inobtrusa (Hampson, 1902)
- Ozarba isocampta Hampson, 1910
- Ozarba jansei Berio, 1940
- Ozarba madanda (Felder & Rogenhofer, 1874)
- Ozarba nigroviridis (Hampson, 1902)
- Ozarba nyanza (Felder & Rogenhofer, 1874)
- Ozarba olimcorniculans Berio, 1940
- Ozarba orthozona (Hampson, 1902)
- Ozarba perplexa Saalmüller, 1891
- Ozarba phaea (Hampson, 1902)
- Ozarba punctithorax Berio, 1940
- Ozarba regia Warren, 1914
- Ozarba semipurpurea (Hampson, 1902)
- Ozarba separabilis Berio, 1940
- Ozarba subterminalis Hampson, 1910
- Ozarba subtusfimbriata Berio, 1940
- Ozarba varia (Walker, 1865)
- Paida pulchra (Trimen, 1863)
- Pandesma anysa Guenée, 1852
- Pandesma muricolor Berio, 1966
- Pandesma robusta (Walker, 1858)
- Pandesma tempica Möschler, 1883
- Pantydia andersoni (Felder & Rogenhofer, 1874)
- Pantydia scissa (Walker, 1865)
- Parachalciope benitensis (Holland, 1894)
- Parachalciope euclidicola (Walker, 1858)
- Parachalciope mahura (Felder & Rogenhofer, 1874)
- Paracroria major Janse, 1938
- Parafodina pentagonalis (Butler, 1894)
- Paragria sesamiodes Hampson, 1926
- Parallelura palumbiodes (Hampson, 1902)
- Paratuerta featheri Fawcett, 1915
- Paratuerta marshalli Hampson, 1902
- Parca africarabia Wiltshire, 1986
- Pareuplexia prolifera (Walker, 1856)
- Paroruza lateritia (Felder & Rogenhofer, 1875)
- Paroruza subductata (Walker, 1861)
- Pataeta transversata Berio, 1966
- Penicillaria ethiopica (Hampson, 1920)
- Pericyma atrifusa (Hampson, 1902)
- Pericyma caffraria (Möschler, 1883)
- Pericyma deducta (Walker, 1858)
- Pericyma mendax (Walker, 1858)
- Pericyma polygramma Hampson, 1913
- Pericyma scandulata (Felder & Rogenhofer, 1874)
- Pericyma umbrina (Guenée, 1852)
- Peridroma goughi D. S. Fletcher, 1963
- Peridroma saucia (Hübner, [1808])
- Perigea bicyclata Gaede, 1915
- Perigea grandirena (Hampson, 1902)
- Perigea quadrimacula (Mabille, 1900)
- Phaegorista agaristoides Boisduval, 1836
- Phaegorista xanthosoma Hampson, 1910
- Phalerodes cauta (Hampson, 1902)
- Phanaspa aegonalis (Walker, 1859)
- Phanaspa derasalis (Guenée, 1854)
- Phanaspa dilatatalis Walker, 1866
- Phanaspa namaqualis (Guenée, 1854)
- Phyllophila griseola (Felder & Rogenhofer, 1874)
- Phyllophila rufescens Hampson, 1910
- Phytometra africana (Snellen, 1872)
- Phytometra carnea (Prout, 1922)
- Phytometra duplicalis (Walker, 1866)
- Phytometra euchroa Hampson, 1918
- Phytometra haemaceps (Hampson, 1910)
- Phytometra helesusalis (Walker, 1859)
- Phytometra heliriusalis (Walker, 1859)
- Phytometra hypopsamma (Hampson, 1926)
- Phytometra opsiphora (Hampson, 1926)
- Phytometra sacraria (Felder & Rogenhofer, 1874)
- Phytometra silona (Schaus, 1893)
- Phytometra subflavalis (Walker, 1865)
- Plecoptera annexa (Distant, 1898)
- Plecoptera arctinotata (Walker, 1865)
- Plecoptera aspila Hampson, 1910
- Plecoptera chalciope Strand, 1918
- Plecoptera flaviceps (Hampson, 1902)
- Plecoptera infuscata Hampson, 1910
- Plecoptera laniata Hampson, 1910
- Plecoptera melalepis Hampson, 1910
- Plecoptera melanoscia Hampson, 1926
- Plecoptera ovaliplaga (Warren, 1914)
- Plecoptera poderis (Wallengren, 1863)
- Plecoptera punctilineata Hampson, 1910
- Plecoptera resistens (Walker, 1858)
- Plecoptera rufirena (Hampson, 1902)
- Plecoptera sarcistis Hampson, 1910
- Plecoptera stuhlmanni (Pagenstecher, 1893)
- Plecoptera thermozona Hampson, 1910
- Plecoptera trichophora Hampson, 1910
- Plecoptera tripalis (Wallengren, 1863)
- Plecoptera zonaria (Distant, 1898)

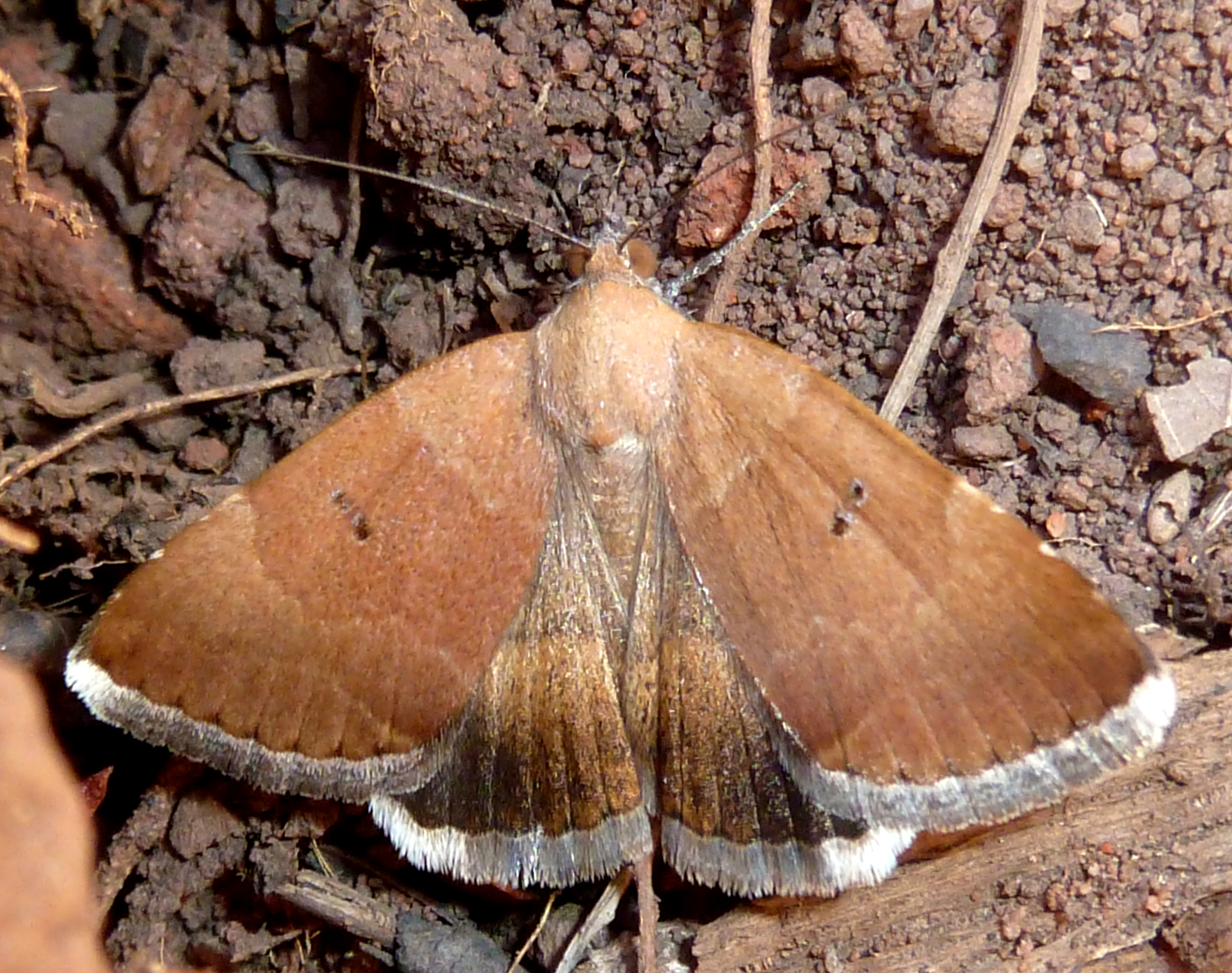
Plecopterodes moderata

- Plecopterodes deprivata Warren, 1914
- Plecopterodes exigua Gaede, 1914
- Plecopterodes melliflua (Holland, 1897)
- Plecopterodes moderata (Wallengren, 1860)
- Pleuronodes arida (Hampson, 1902)
- Pleuronodes lepticyma (Hampson, 1909)
- Pleuronodes trogopera (Hampson, 1910)
- Plusia ablusa Felder & Rogenhofer, 1874
- Plusia aenescens Prout, 1921
- Plusia angulum Guenée, 1852
- Plusia aranea Hampson, 1909
- Plusia argyrodonta Hampson, 1910
- Plusia clarci Hampson, 1910
- Plusia distalagma (Hampson, 1913)
- Plusia euchroa (Hampson, 1918)
- Plusia euchroides Carcasson, 1965
- Plusia geminipuncta Hampson, 1902
- Plusia guenei Wallengren, 1856
- Plusia lavendula Hampson, 1902
- Plusia melanocephala Möschler, 1883
- Plusia rectilinea Wallengren, 1856
- Plusia roseofasciata Carcasson, 1965
- Plusia violascens (Hampson, 1913)
- Plusiodonta achalcea Hampson, 1926
- Plusiodonta commoda Walker, 1865
- Plusiodonta natalensis Walker, 1865
- Plusiodonta nictites Hampson, 1902
- Plusiodonta wahlbergi (Felder & Rogenhofer, 1874)
- Plusiopalpa dichora Holland, 1894
- Plusiophaes argosticta D. S. Fletcher, 1961
- Plusiophaes bipuncta (Hampson, 1902)
- Plusiotricha fletcheri Dufay, 1972
- Plusiotricha livida Holland, 1894
- Polydesma boarmoides Guenée, 1852
- Polydesma scriptilis Guenée, 1852
- Polydesma sexmaculata Berio, 1971
- Polydesma umbricola Boisduval, 1833
- Polypogon caffrarium (Möschler, 1883)
- Polypogon fractale (Guenée, 1854)
- Polytelodes florifera (Walker, 1858)
- Prionofrontia erygidia Hampson, 1902
- Prionofrontia strigata Hampson, 1926
- Pristanepa platti Hampson, 1926
- Procanthia distantii (Dewitz, 1881)
- Procanthia nivea Rothschild, 1910
- Proconis abrostoloides Hampson, 1902
- Procrateria basifascia Pinhey, 1968
- Procrateria pterota Hampson, 1909
- Progonia grisea (Hampson, 1905)
- Progonia luctuosa (Hampson, 1902)
- Progonia perarcuata (Hampson, 1902)
- Proruaca harmonica Distant, 1901
- Proruaca recurrens Hampson, 1902
- Proschaliphora albida Hampson, 1909
- Proschaliphora butti Rothschild, 1910
- Pseudagoma pinheyi Kiriakoff, 1975
- Pseudomicrodes ecrufa (Hampson, 1905)
- Pseudomicrodes fuscipars Hampson, 1910
- Pseudomicrodes mediorufa Hampson, 1910
- Pseudomicrodes ochrocraspis Hampson, 1910
- Radara prunescens (Hampson, 1902)
- Radara subcupralis (Walker, [1866])
- Radara thermeola Hampson, 1926
- Radara vacillans Walker, 1862
- Ramesodes divisa (Hampson, 1902)
- Raparna tritonias Hampson, 1902
- Rhabdophera hansali (Felder & Rogenhofer, 1874)
- Rhanidophora agrippa Druce, 1899
- Rhanidophora aurantiaca Hampson, 1902
- Rhanidophora cinctigutta (Walker, 1862)
- Rhanidophora enucleata Mabille, 1900
- Rhanidophora flavigutta Hampson, 1926
- Rhanidophora ridens Hampson, 1902
- Rhesala goleta (Felder & Rogenhofer, 1874)
- Rhesala grisea (Hampson, 1916)
- Rhesala moestalis (Walker, 1866)
- Rhesalides natalensis Hampson, 1926
- Rhizotype palliata Warren, 1914
- Rhodochlaena botonga (Felder & Rogenhofer, 1874)
- Rhynchina coniodes Vári, 1962
- Rhynchina equalisella (Walker, 1863)
- Rhynchina perangulata Hampson, 1916
- Rhynchina poecilopa Vári, 1962
- Rhynchina poliopera Hampson, 1902
- Rhynchina revolutalis (Zeller, 1852)
- Rhynchina tinctalis (Zeller, 1852)
- Rhynchodontodes antistropha (Vári, 1962)
- Rivula parallela (Hampson, 1902)
- Rivula vicarialis Walker, 1866
- Rothia rhaeo (Druce, 1894)
- Saalmuellerana schoenheiti (Strand, 1912)
- Sarmatia interitalis Guenée, 1854
- Saroba cyanescens Hampson, 1926
- Schausia coryndoni (Rothschild, 1896)
- Sciomesa mesoscia (Hampson, 1918)
- Sciomesa scotochroa (Hampson, 1914)
- Sclereuxoa paradoxalis (Berio, 1974)
- Selenistis annulella (Hampson, 1902)
- Serrodes flavitincta Hampson, 1926
- Serrodes trispila (Mabille, 1890)
- Sesamia albicolor Janse, 1939
- Sesamia albivena Hampson, 1902
- Sesamia botanephaga Tams & Bowden, 1953
- Sesamia calamistis Hampson, 1910
- Sesamia coniota Hampson, 1902
- Sesamia cretica Lederer, 1857
- Sesamia epunctifera Hampson, 1902
- Sesamia incerta (Walker, 1856)
- Sesamia inferens (Walker, 1856)
- Sesamia jansei Tams & Bowden, 1953
- Sesamia nonagrioides (Lefèbvre, 1827)
- Sesamia poephaga Tams & Bowden, 1953
- Sesamia rufescens Hampson, 1910
- Sesamia steniptera Hampson, 1914
- Sesamia sylvata Janse, 1939
- Sesamia taenioleuca (Wallengren, 1866)
- Sidemia spodopterodes Hampson, 1908
- Simplicia extinctalis (Zeller, 1852)
- Simplicia inflexalis Guenée, 1854
- Simplicia telamusalis (Walker, 1859)
- Sommeria culta Hübner, 1831
- Sommeria sinuosa (Hampson, 1905)
- Sommeria spilosoma (Felder, 1874)
- Sommeria spilosomoides (Walker, 1865)
- Sommeria strabonis (Hampson, 1910)
- Speia vuteria (Stoll, 1790)

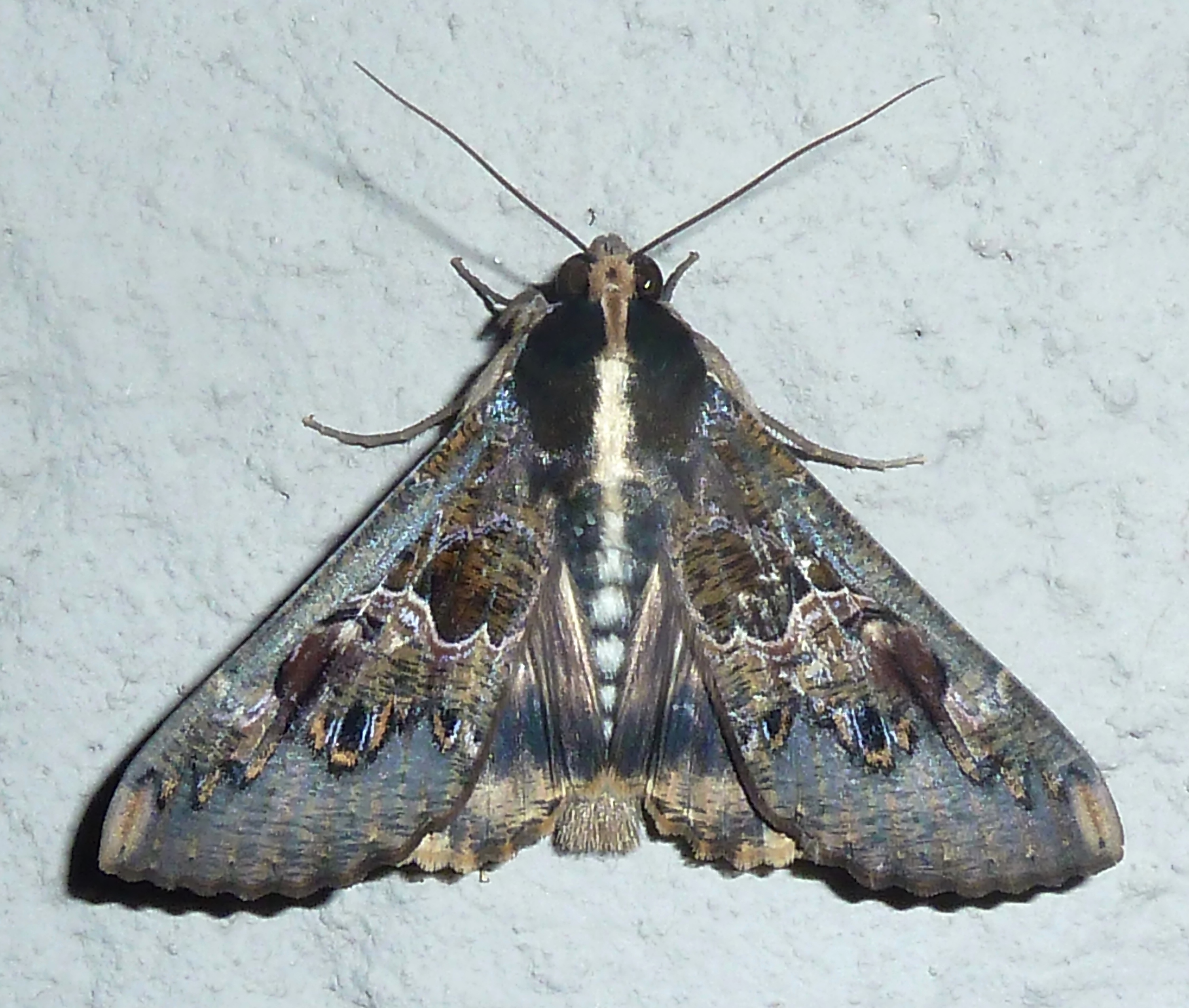
Sphingomorpha chlorea

- Sphingomorpha chlorea (Cramer, 1777)
- Sphingomorpha marshalli Hampson, 1902
- Spirama inconspicua (Herrich-Schäffer, 1854)
- Spirama miniata (Wallengren, 1856)
- Spodoptera apertura (Walker, 1865)
- Spodoptera cilium Guenée, 1852
- Spodoptera exempta (Walker, 1857)
- Spodoptera exigua (Hübner, 1808)
- Spodoptera littoralis (Boisduval, 1833)
- Spodoptera mauritia (Boisduval, 1833)
- Stenopterygia subcurva (Walker, 1857)
- Stenosticta grisea Hampson, 1912
- Stictoptera antemarginata Saalmüller, 1880
- Stictoptera confluens (Walker, 1858)
- Stictoptera gabri (Berio, 1970)
- Stigmoplusia chalcoides (Dufay, 1968)
- Stigmoplusia paraplesia Dufay, 1972
- Stomafrontia albifasciata Hampson, 1905
- Syfanoidea schencki Bartel, 1903
- Syncalama mimica Hampson, 1910
- Syncalama turneri Tams, 1930
- Syngrapha circumflexa (Linnaeus, 1767)
- Tachosa acronyctoides Walker, 1869
- Tachosa fumata (Wallengren, 1860)
- Tathorhynchus exsiccata (Lederer, 1855)
- Tathorhynchus homogyna Hampson, 1902
- Tathorhynchus leucobasis Bethune-Baker, 1911
- Tathorhynchus plumbea (Distant, 1898)
- Tatorinia fumipennis (Felder & Rogenhofer, 1874)
- Tavia instruens Walker, 1858
- Tavia latebra Hampson, 1926
- Tavia nycterina (Boisduval, 1833)
- Taviodes subjecta (Walker, 1865)
- Tegiapa larentiodes (Prout, 1922)
- Tetracme truncataria (Walker, 1861)
- Thalpochares caffrorum Wallengren, 1860
- Thalpochares squamilinea Felder & Rogenhofer, 1874
- Thiacidas cookei (Pinhey, 1958)
- Thiacidas duplicata (Grünberg, 1910)
- Thiacidas fractilinea (Pinhey, 1968)
- Thiacidas intermedia Hacker & Zilli, 2007
- Thiacidas nigrimacula (Pinhey, 1968)
- Thiacidas permutata Hacker & Zilli, 2007
- Thiacidas roseotincta (Pinhey, 1962)
- Thyas arcifera (Hampson, 1913)
- Thyas rubricata (Holland, 1894)
- Thyatirina achatina (Weymer, 1896)

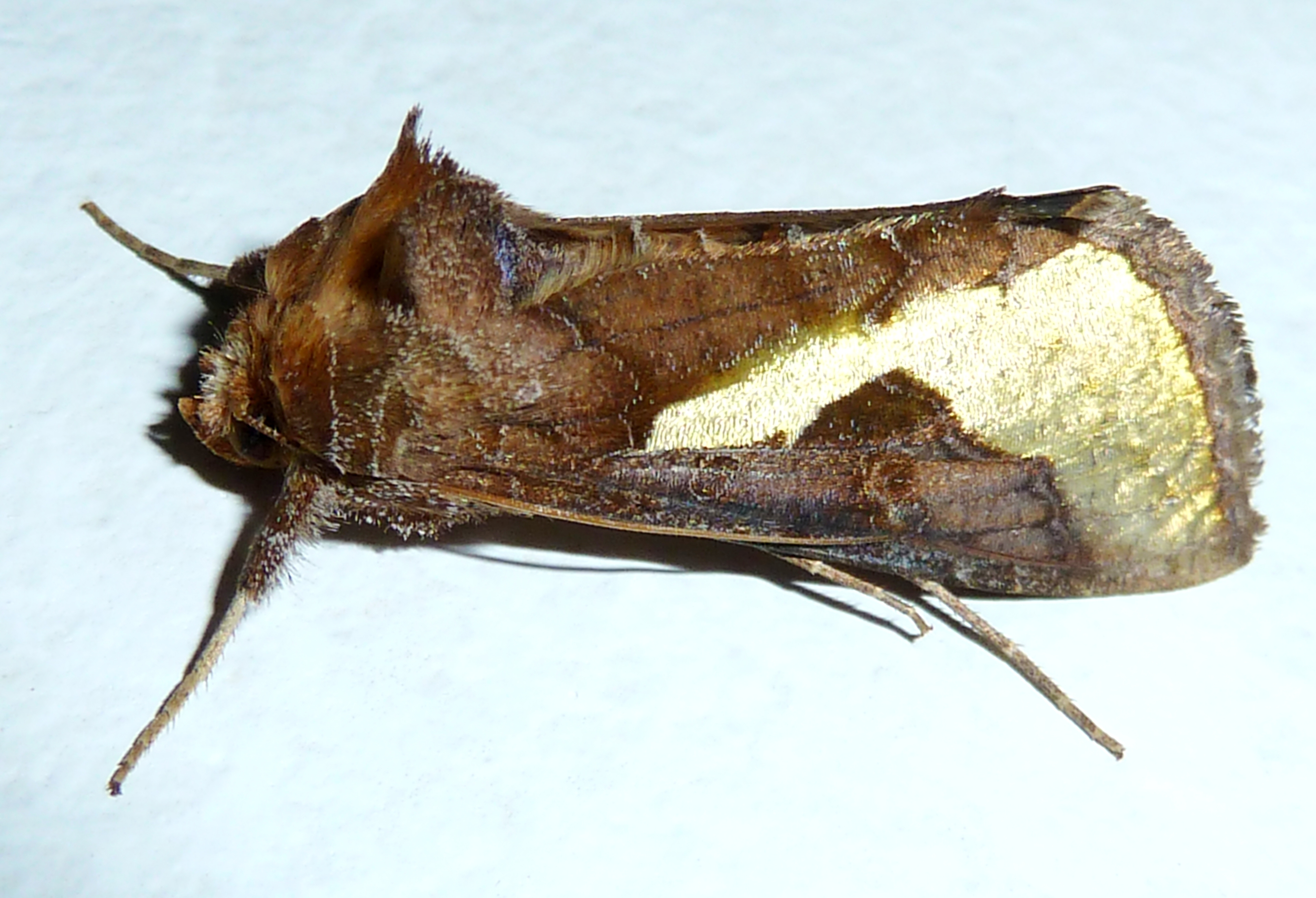
Thysanoplusia orichalcea

- Thysanoplusia chalcedona (Hampson, 1902)
- Thysanoplusia exquisita (Felder & Rogenhofer, 1874)
- Thysanoplusia indicator (Walker, [1858])
- Thysanoplusia sestertia (Felder & Rogenhofer, 1874)
- Thysanoplusia tetrastigma (Hampson, 1910)
- Timora albisticta Janse, 1917
- Timora diarhoda Hampson, 1909
- Toana atridiscata Pinhey, 1968
- Tolna complicata (Butler, 1880)
- Tolna demaculata Strand, 1913
- Tolna limula (Möschler, 1883)
- Tolna macrosema Hampson, 1913
- Tolna sinifera Hampson, 1913
- Tolna sypnoides (Butler, 1878)
- Tolna variegata (Hampson, 1905)
- Tolpia suffuscalis (Swinhoe, 1887)
- Trachea normalis Hampson, 1914
- Trachea oxylus (Fawcett, 1917)
- Tracheplexia albimacula Janse, 1937
- Tracheplexia amaranta (Felder & Rogenhofer, 1974)
- Tracheplexia lucia (Felder & Rogenhofer, 1974)
- Trichoplusia acosmia Dufay, 1972
- Trichoplusia arachnoides (Distant, 1901)
- Trichoplusia asapheia Dufay, 1977
- Trichoplusia callista Dufay, 1972
- Trichoplusia capnista Dufay, 1972
- Trichoplusia epicharis Dufay, 1972
- Trichoplusia glyceia Dufay, 1972
- Trichoplusia laportei Dufay, 1972
- Trichoplusia molybdina (Dufay, 1968)
- Trichoplusia ni (Hübner, [1803])
- Trichoplusia orichalcea (Fabricius, 1775)
- Trigonodes hyppasia (Cramer, 1779)
- Trogocraspis durbanica Hampson, 1918
- Tycomarptes inferior (Guenée, 1852)
- Tycomarptes praetermissa (Walker, 1857)
- Tytroca balnearia (Distant, 1898)
- Tytroca leucoptera (Hampson, 1896)
- Tytroca metaxantha (Hampson, 1902)
- Ugia amaponda (Felder & Rogenhofer, 1874)
- Ugia taeniata (Holland, 1894)
- Ulochlaena ferruginea (Gaede, 1915)
- Ulochlaena fumea (Hampson, 1902)
- Ulochlaena reducta (Gaede, 1915)
- Ulochlaena sagittata (Gaede, 1915)
- Ulochlaena schaeferi Gaede, 1915
- Ulotrichopus catocala (Felder & Rogenhofer, 1874)
- Ulotrichopus glaucescens Hampson, 1913
- Ulotrichopus leucopasta Hampson, 1913
- Ulotrichopus lucidus Pinhey, 1968
- Ulotrichopus mesoleuca (Walker, 1858)
- Ulotrichopus nigricans Laporte, 1973
- Ulotrichopus primulina (Hampson, 1902)
- Ulotrichopus tessmanni Gaede, 1936
- Ulotrichopus variegata (Hampson, 1902)
- Vietteania torrentium (Guenée, 1852)
- Vittaplusia vittata (Wallengren, 1856)
- Xanthia basalis Walker, 1862
- Xanthomera leucoglene (Mabille, 1880)
- Zalaca anticalis Walker, 1866
- Zalaca snelleni (Wallengren, 1875)
