= Tetracme =

Tetracme is the scientific name of two genera of organisms and may refer to:

- Tetracme (moth), a genus of insects in the family Erebidae
- Tetracme (plant), a genus of plants in the family Brassicaceae
