= Afrogortyna =

Scientific classification
- Domain: Eukaryota
- Kingdom: Animalia
- Phylum: Arthropoda
- Class: Insecta
- Order: Lepidoptera
- Superfamily: Noctuoidea
- Family: Noctuidae
- Subfamily: Xyleninae
- Genus: Afrogortyna; Krüger, 1997

Genus of moths

Afrogortyna is a genus of moths of the family Noctuidae.

== Species ==
- Afrogortyna altimontana Krüger, 1997
- Afrogortyna trinota (Herrich-Schäffer, [1854])
