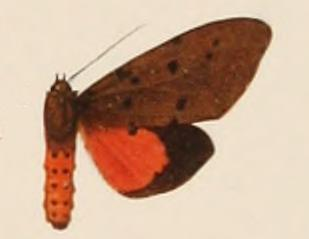

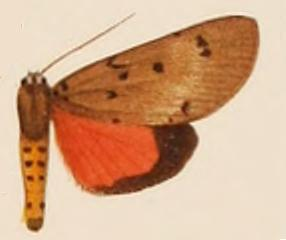

Scientific classification
- Domain: Eukaryota
- Kingdom: Animalia
- Phylum: Arthropoda
- Class: Insecta
- Order: Lepidoptera
- Superfamily: Noctuoidea
- Family: Erebidae
- Subfamily: Arctiinae
- Genus: Axiopoeniella; Strand, 1909

= Axiopoeniella =

Genus of moths

Axiopoeniella is a genus of moths in the subfamily Arctiinae. The genus was described by Strand in 1909.

== Species ==
- Axiopoeniella laymerisa (Grandidier, 1867)
- Axiopoeniella octocentra Vári, 1964
