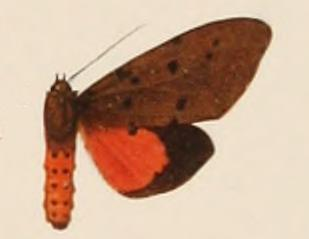

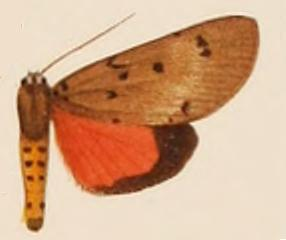

Scientific classification
- Kingdom: Animalia
- Phylum: Arthropoda
- Class: Insecta
- Order: Lepidoptera
- Superfamily: Noctuoidea
- Family: Erebidae
- Subfamily: Arctiinae
- Genus: Axiopoeniella
- Species: A. laymerisa

Binomial name
- Axiopoeniella laymerisa (Grandidier, 1867)

Synonyms
- Lithosia laymerisa Grandidier, 1867; Axiopoeniella lasti Rothschild, 1910; Axiopoeniella occultans (Snellen, 1869)

= Axiopoeniella laymerisa =

Species of moth

Axiopoeniella laymerisa is a species of moth in the subfamily Arctiinae first described by Alfred Grandidier in 1867. It is found on Madagascar.
