= Meneptera =

Scientific classification
- Kingdom: Animalia
- Phylum: Arthropoda
- Class: Insecta
- Order: Lepidoptera
- Superfamily: Noctuoidea
- Family: Noctuidae
- Subfamily: Acontiinae
- Genus: Meneptera; Hampson, 1910
- Species: M. diopis

Binomial name
- Meneptera diopis (Hampson, 1905)

Synonyms
- Tarache diopis Hampson, 1905

Genus of moths

Meneptera is a monotypic moth genus of the family Noctuidae. Its only species, Meneptera diopis, is found in South Africa. Both the genus and species were first described by George Hampson, the genus in 1910 and the species five years earlier in 1905.
