= Pristanepa =

Scientific classification
- Kingdom: Animalia
- Phylum: Arthropoda
- Class: Insecta
- Order: Lepidoptera
- Superfamily: Noctuoidea
- Family: Erebidae
- Subfamily: Calpinae
- Genus: Pristanepa; Hampson, 1926
- Species: P. platti

Binomial name
- Pristanepa platti Hampson, 1926

Genus of moths

Pristanepa is a monotypic moth genus of the family Erebidae. Its only species, Pristanepa platti, is found in Eswatini, Mozambique, South Africa and Eswatini. Both the genus and species were first described by George Hampson in 1926.
