= Fulvarba =

Scientific classification
- Domain: Eukaryota
- Kingdom: Animalia
- Phylum: Arthropoda
- Class: Insecta
- Order: Lepidoptera
- Superfamily: Noctuoidea
- Family: Noctuidae
- Subfamily: Acontiinae
- Genus: Fulvarba; Berio, 1950
- Species: F. fulvescens

Binomial name
- Fulvarba fulvescens (Hampson, 1910)

Genus of moths

Fulvarba is a monotypic moth genus of the family Noctuidae erected by Emilio Berio in 1950. Its only species, Fulvarba fulvescens, was first described by George Hampson in 1910. It is found in South Africa.
