= Axiopoeniella octocentra =

Scientific classification
- Kingdom: Animalia
- Phylum: Arthropoda
- Clade: Pancrustacea
- Class: Insecta
- Order: Lepidoptera
- Superfamily: Noctuoidea
- Family: Erebidae
- Subfamily: Arctiinae
- Genus: Axiopoeniella
- Species: A. octocentra

Binomial name
- Axiopoeniella octocentra Vári, 1964

Species of moth

Axiopoeniella octocentra is a species of moth in the subfamily Arctiinae first described by Vári in 1964. It is found in South Africa.
