= Disticta =

Scientific classification
- Kingdom: Animalia
- Phylum: Arthropoda
- Clade: Pancrustacea
- Class: Insecta
- Order: Lepidoptera
- Superfamily: Noctuoidea
- Family: Erebidae
- Subfamily: Calpinae
- Genus: Disticta; Hampson, 1902
- Species: D. atava

Binomial name
- Disticta atava (R. Felder & Rogenhofer, 1875)

Genus of moths

Disticta is a monotypic moth genus of the family Erebidae erected by George Hampson in 1902. Its only species, Disticta atava, was first described by Rudolf Felder and Alois Friedrich Rogenhofer in 1875. It is found in Eswatini, Mozambique and South Africa.
