= Mepantadrea =

Scientific classification
- Kingdom: Animalia
- Phylum: Arthropoda
- Clade: Pancrustacea
- Class: Insecta
- Order: Lepidoptera
- Superfamily: Noctuoidea
- Family: Erebidae
- Subfamily: Calpinae
- Genus: Mepantadrea; Hampson, 1926
- Species: M. simia

Binomial name
- Mepantadrea simia (Saalmüller, 1891)

Synonyms
- Zethes simia Saalmüller, 1891

Genus of moths

Mepantadrea is a monotypic moth genus of the family Erebidae erected by George Hampson in 1926. Its only species, Mepantadrea simia, was first described by Saalmüller in 1891. It is found on Madagascar.
