= Paragria =

Scientific classification
- Kingdom: Animalia
- Phylum: Arthropoda
- Class: Insecta
- Order: Lepidoptera
- Superfamily: Noctuoidea
- Family: Erebidae
- Subfamily: Calpinae
- Genus: Paragria; Hampson, 1926
- Species: P. sesamiodes

Binomial name
- Paragria sesamiodes Hampson, 1926

Genus of moths

Paragria is a monotypic moth genus of the family Erebidae. Its only species, Paragria sesamiodes, is found in South Africa and Uganda. Both the genus and species were first described by George Hampson in 1926.
