= Cucullia extricata =

Scientific classification
- Kingdom: Animalia
- Phylum: Arthropoda
- Clade: Pancrustacea
- Class: Insecta
- Order: Lepidoptera
- Superfamily: Noctuoidea
- Family: Noctuidae
- Genus: Cucullia
- Species: C. extricata

Binomial name
- Cucullia extricata Walker, 1857

Species of moth

Cucullia extricata is a species of moth in the family Noctuidae. It was described by Francis Walker in 1857. This species has been documented in South Africa.
