= Tetracme (plant) =

Scientific classification
- Kingdom: Plantae
- Clade: Tracheophytes
- Clade: Angiosperms
- Clade: Eudicots
- Clade: Rosids
- Order: Brassicales
- Family: Brassicaceae
- Tribe: Euclidieae
- Genus: Tetracme; Bunge

Synonyms
- Tetraceratium Kuntze; Tetracmidion Korsh.

Genus of flowering plants

Tetracme is a genus of flowering plants in the family Brassicaceae. It includes seven species native to temperate Asia, ranging from Iran to Central Asia, Mongolia, Tibet, and the Western Himalayas.

== Species ==
Seven species are accepted.

- Tetracme bucharica (Korsh.) O.E.Schulz
- Tetracme contorta Boiss.
- Tetracme pamirica Vassilcz.
- Tetracme quadricornis (Willd.) Bunge
- Tetracme recurvata Bunge
- Tetracme secunda Boiss.
- Tetracme stocksii Boiss.
