= Archephia =

Scientific classification
- Kingdom: Animalia
- Phylum: Arthropoda
- Class: Insecta
- Order: Lepidoptera
- Superfamily: Noctuoidea
- Family: Noctuidae (?)
- Subfamily: Catocalinae
- Genus: Archephia; Hampson, 1926
- Species: A. basilinea

Binomial name
- Archephia basilinea (Hampson, 1902)

Synonyms
- Archephia olivacea Hampson, 1926

Genus of moths

Archephia is a genus of moths of the family Noctuidae. Its only species, Archephia basilinea, is known from South Africa. Both the genus and the species were first described by George Hampson, the genus in 1926 and the species in 1902.
