= Thyatirina =

Scientific classification
- Kingdom: Animalia
- Phylum: Arthropoda
- Clade: Pancrustacea
- Class: Insecta
- Order: Lepidoptera
- Superfamily: Noctuoidea
- Family: Noctuidae
- Subfamily: Acontiinae
- Genus: Thyatirina; Hampson, 1910
- Species: T. achatina

Binomial name
- Thyatirina achatina (Weymer, 1896)

Synonyms
- Thyatira achatina Weymer, 1896

Genus of moths

Thyatirina is a monotypic moth genus of the family Noctuidae erected by George Hampson in 1910. Its only species, Thyatirina achatina, was first described by Weymer in 1896. It is found in Zaire, Kenya, Tanzania, Mozambique, Zimbabwe, Zambia, South Africa, the Democratic Republic of the Congo and Malawi.
