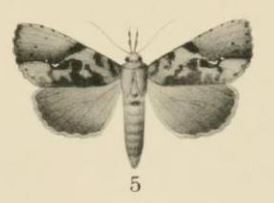

Scientific classification
- Kingdom: Animalia
- Phylum: Arthropoda
- Class: Insecta
- Order: Lepidoptera
- Superfamily: Noctuoidea
- Family: Erebidae
- Subfamily: Calpinae
- Genus: Meliaba; Walker, 1859
- Species: M. pelopsalis

Binomial name
- Meliaba pelopsalis Walker, 1859

Synonyms
- Generic: Ichthyopselapha Aurivillius, 1910; Specific: Meliaba insignis (Aurivillius, 1910)

= Meliaba =

Genus of moths

Meliaba is a monotypic moth genus of the family Erebidae. Its only species, Meliaba pelopsalis, is known from South Africa, Eswatini, Tanzania and Zimbabwe. Both the genus and the species were first described by Francis Walker in 1859.
