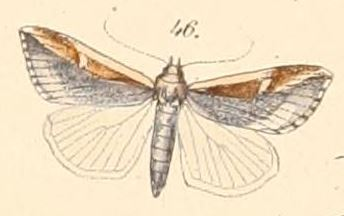

Scientific classification
- Kingdom: Animalia
- Phylum: Arthropoda
- Class: Insecta
- Order: Lepidoptera
- Superfamily: Noctuoidea
- Family: Erebidae
- Subfamily: Calpinae
- Genus: Epimeciodes; Hampson, 1926
- Species: E. abunda

Binomial name
- Epimeciodes abunda (R. Felder & Rogenhofer, 1875)

Synonyms
- Epimecia abunda Felder & Rogenhofer, 1874

= Epimeciodes =

Genus of moths

Epimeciodes is a monotypic moth genus of the family Erebidae, established by George Hampson in 1926. Its only species, Epimeciodes abunda, was first described by Rudolf Felder and Alois Friedrich Rogenhofer in 1874. This species is found in South Africa.
