= Chalestra =

Scientific classification
- Kingdom: Animalia
- Phylum: Arthropoda
- Class: Insecta
- Order: Lepidoptera
- Superfamily: Noctuoidea
- Family: Erebidae
- Subfamily: Calpinae
- Genus: Chalestra; Walker, 1859
- Species: C. podaresalis

Binomial name
- Chalestra podaresalis Walker, 1859

Genus of moths

Chalestra is a monotypic moth genus of the family Erebidae. Its only species, Chalestra podaresalis, is found in South Africa. Both the genus and species were first described by Francis Walker in 1859.
