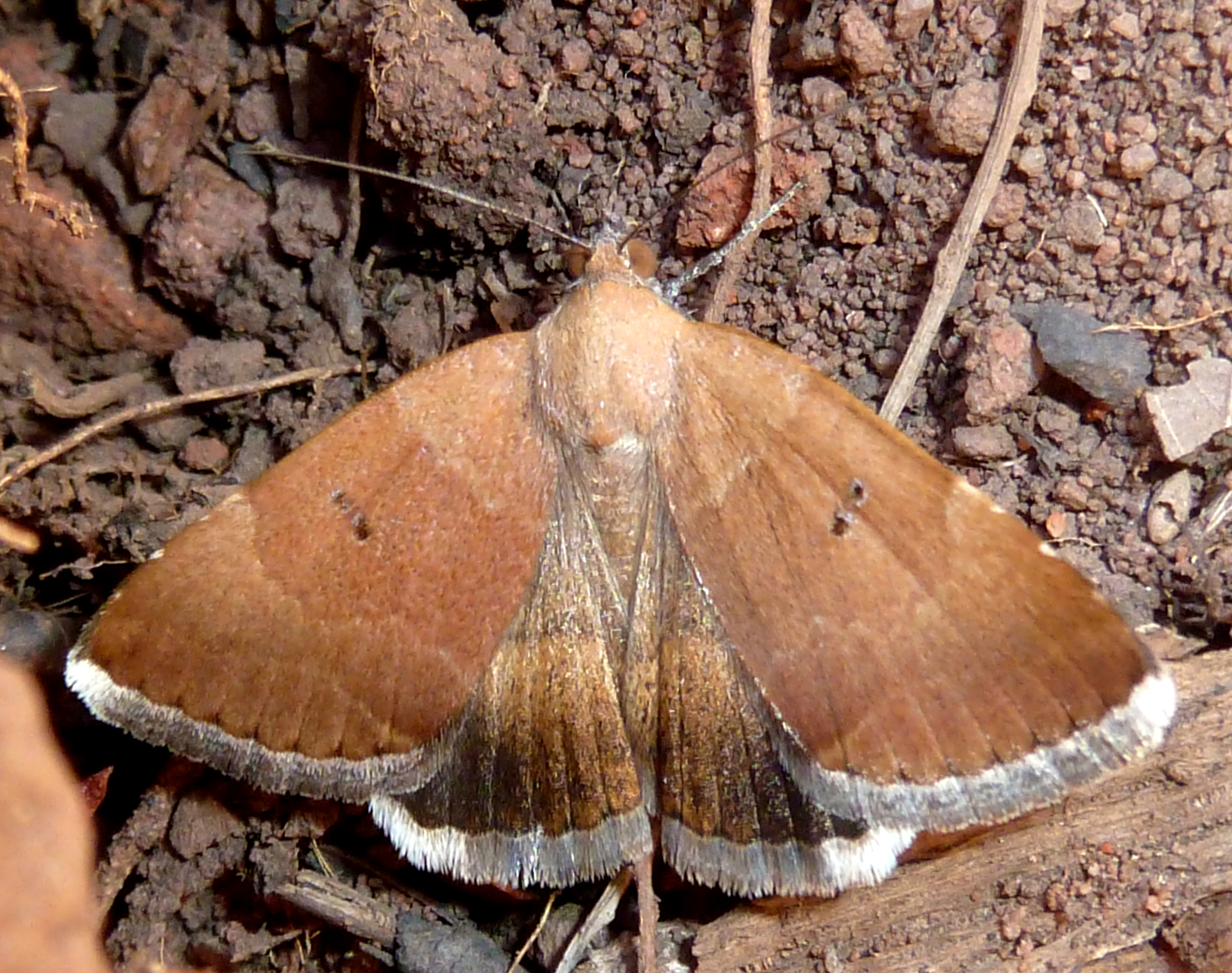
- P. moderata in South Africa

Scientific classification
- Kingdom: Animalia
- Phylum: Arthropoda
- Class: Insecta
- Order: Lepidoptera
- Superfamily: Noctuoidea
- Family: Erebidae
- Genus: Plecopterodes; Hampson, 1913

Type species
- Grammodes moderata Wallengren, 1860

= Plecopterodes =

Genus of moths

Plecopterodes is an Afrotropical genus of moths of the family Erebidae.

== Species ==
The species include:

- Plecopterodes clytie Gaede, 1936
- Plecopterodes deprivata Warren, 1914
- Plecopterodes dissidens Gaede, 1914
- Plecopterodes exigua Gaede, 1914
- Plecopterodes gandolfii Berio, 1939
- Plecopterodes griseicilia (Hampson, 1910)
- Plecopterodes heterochroa (Hampson, 1910)
- Plecopterodes lutosa (Grünberg, 1910)
- Plecopterodes melliflua (Holland, 1897)
- Plecopterodes moderata (Wallengren, 1860)
- Plecopterodes molybdena Berio, 1954
- Plecopterodes molybdopasta (Hampson, 1910)
- Plecopterodes synethes Hampson, 1913
