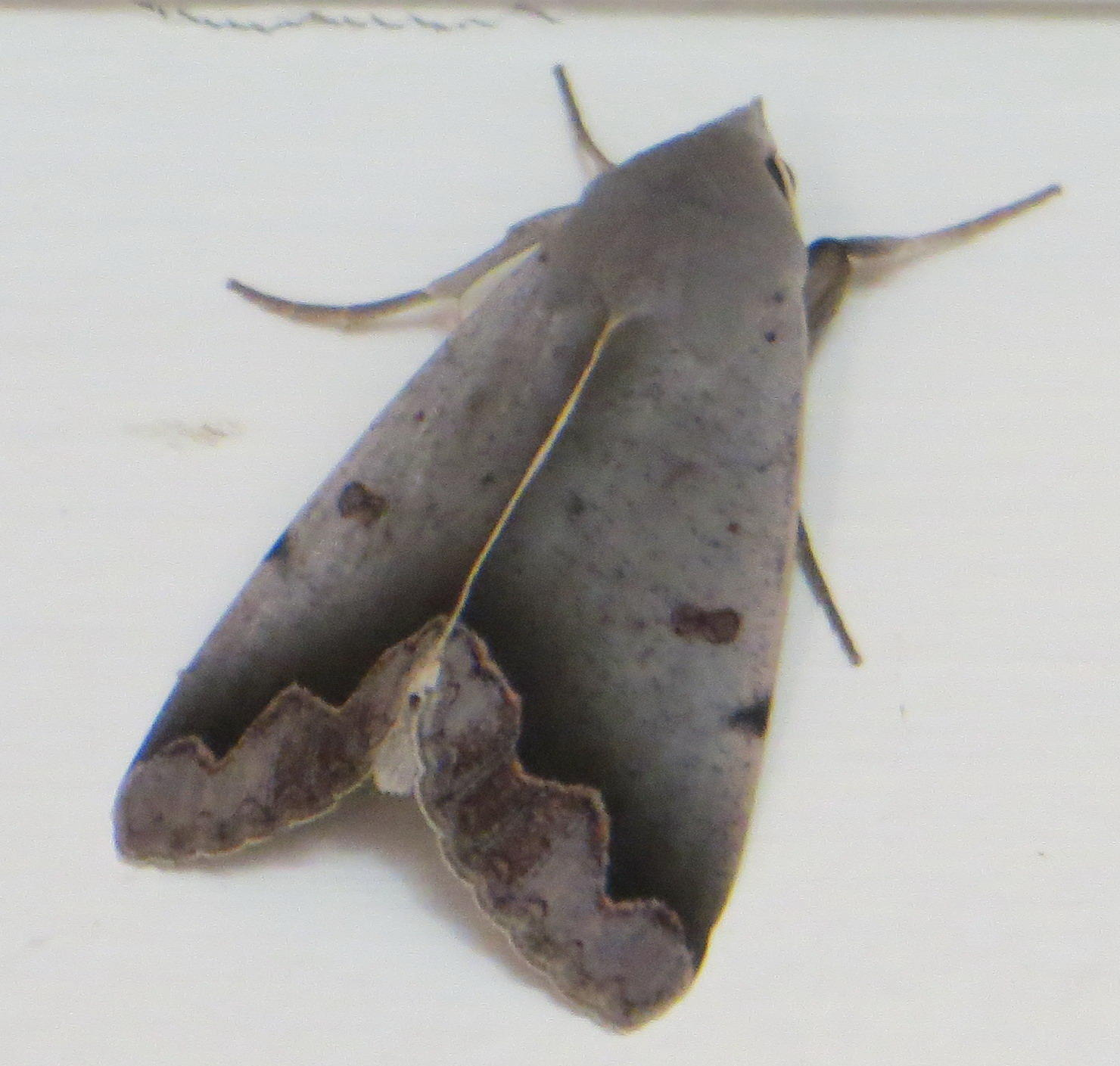

Scientific classification
- Kingdom: Animalia
- Phylum: Arthropoda
- Clade: Pancrustacea
- Class: Insecta
- Order: Lepidoptera
- Superfamily: Noctuoidea
- Family: Erebidae
- Genus: Ophiusa
- Species: O. dianaris

Binomial name
- Ophiusa dianaris (Guenée, 1852)

Synonyms
- Ophiodes dianaris Guenée, 1852; Anua dianaris (Guenée, 1852); Ophiusa (Trichanua) dianaris (Guenée, 1852); Trichanua dianaris (Guenée, 1852); Ophiusa tempica (Möschler, 1884); Pandesma tempica Möschler, 1884

= Ophiusa dianaris =

Species of moth

Ophiusa dianaris is a moth of the family Erebidae. It is found in Africa, including Eswatini, Ethiopia, and South Africa.
