= Afrogortyna altimontana =

Scientific classification
- Domain: Eukaryota
- Kingdom: Animalia
- Phylum: Arthropoda
- Class: Insecta
- Order: Lepidoptera
- Superfamily: Noctuoidea
- Family: Noctuidae
- Genus: Afrogortyna
- Species: A. altimontana

Binomial name
- Afrogortyna altimontana Krüger, 1997

Species of moth

Afrogortyna altimontana is a moth of the family Noctuidae first described by Krüger in 1997. It is endemic to Lesotho.
