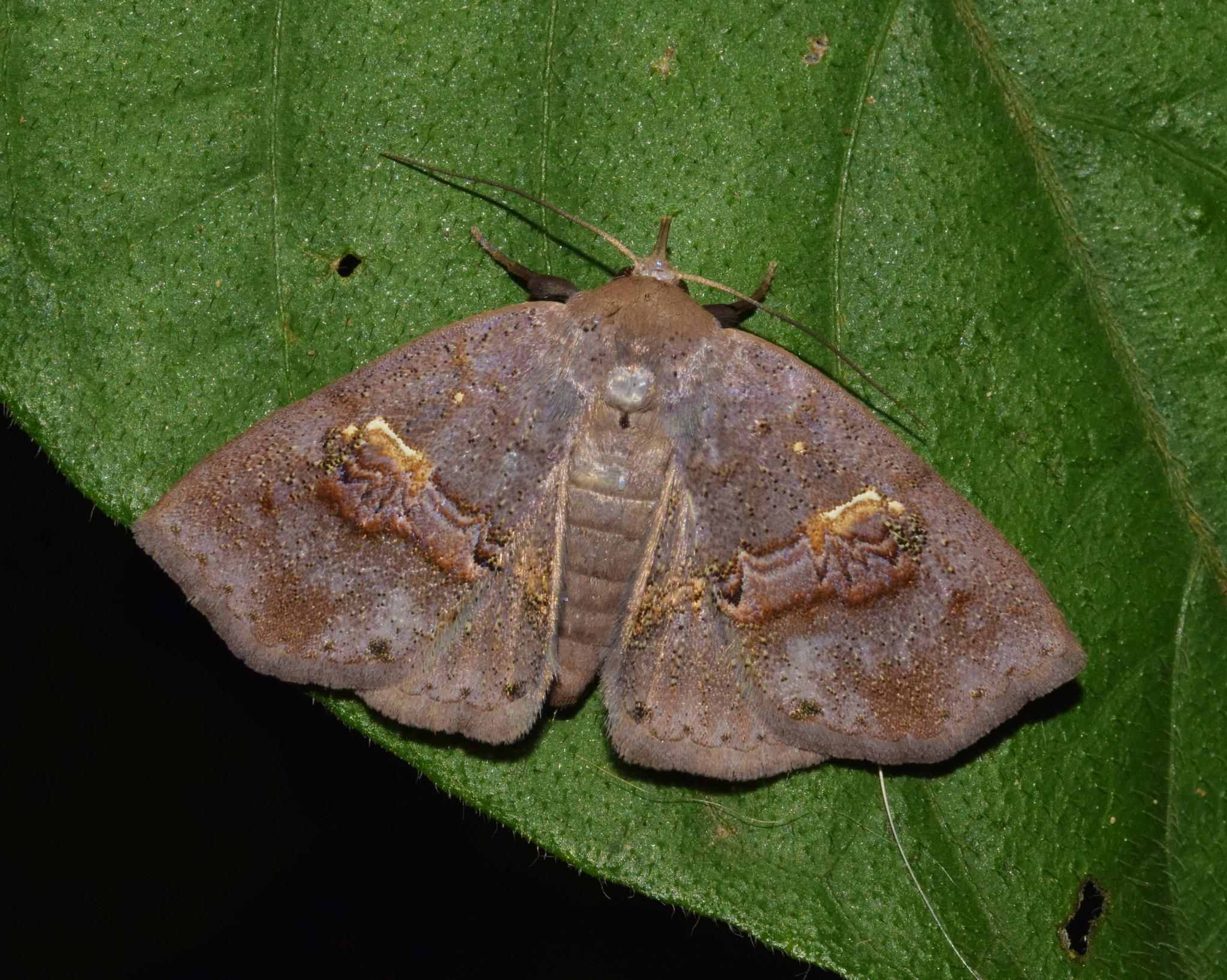
- Bonaberiana crassisquama

Scientific classification
- Kingdom: Animalia
- Phylum: Arthropoda
- Class: Insecta
- Order: Lepidoptera
- Superfamily: Noctuoidea
- Family: Erebidae
- Subfamily: Calpinae
- Genus: Bonaberiana; Strand, 1915
- Species: B. crassisquama

Binomial name
- Bonaberiana crassisquama Strand, 1915

Synonyms
- Bonaberiana cyanescens (Hampson, 1926); Bonaberiana picta (Hampson, 1926)

= Bonaberiana =

Genus of moths

Bonaberiana is a monotypic moth genus of the family Erebidae. Its only species, Bonaberiana crassisquama, is found in sub-Saharan Africa. Both the genus and species were first described by Strand in 1915.
