= Lipatephia =

Scientific classification
- Kingdom: Animalia
- Phylum: Arthropoda
- Class: Insecta
- Order: Lepidoptera
- Superfamily: Noctuoidea
- Family: Erebidae
- Subfamily: Calpinae
- Genus: Lipatephia; Hampson, 1926
- Species: L. illegitima

Binomial name
- Lipatephia illegitima Wallengren, 1875

Synonyms
- Anophia illegitima Wallengren, 1875; Aedia illegitima (Wallengren, 1875)

Genus of moths

Lipatephia is a monotypic moth genus belonging to the family Erebidae. It was established by George Hampson in 1926. The sole species within this genus, Lipatephia illegitima, was first described by Wallengren in 1875. This species is found in South Africa.

Lepidoptera and Some Other Life Forms and Afromoths give this name as a synonym of Aedia Hübner, [1823] and the species as Aedia illegitima (Wallengren, 1875).
