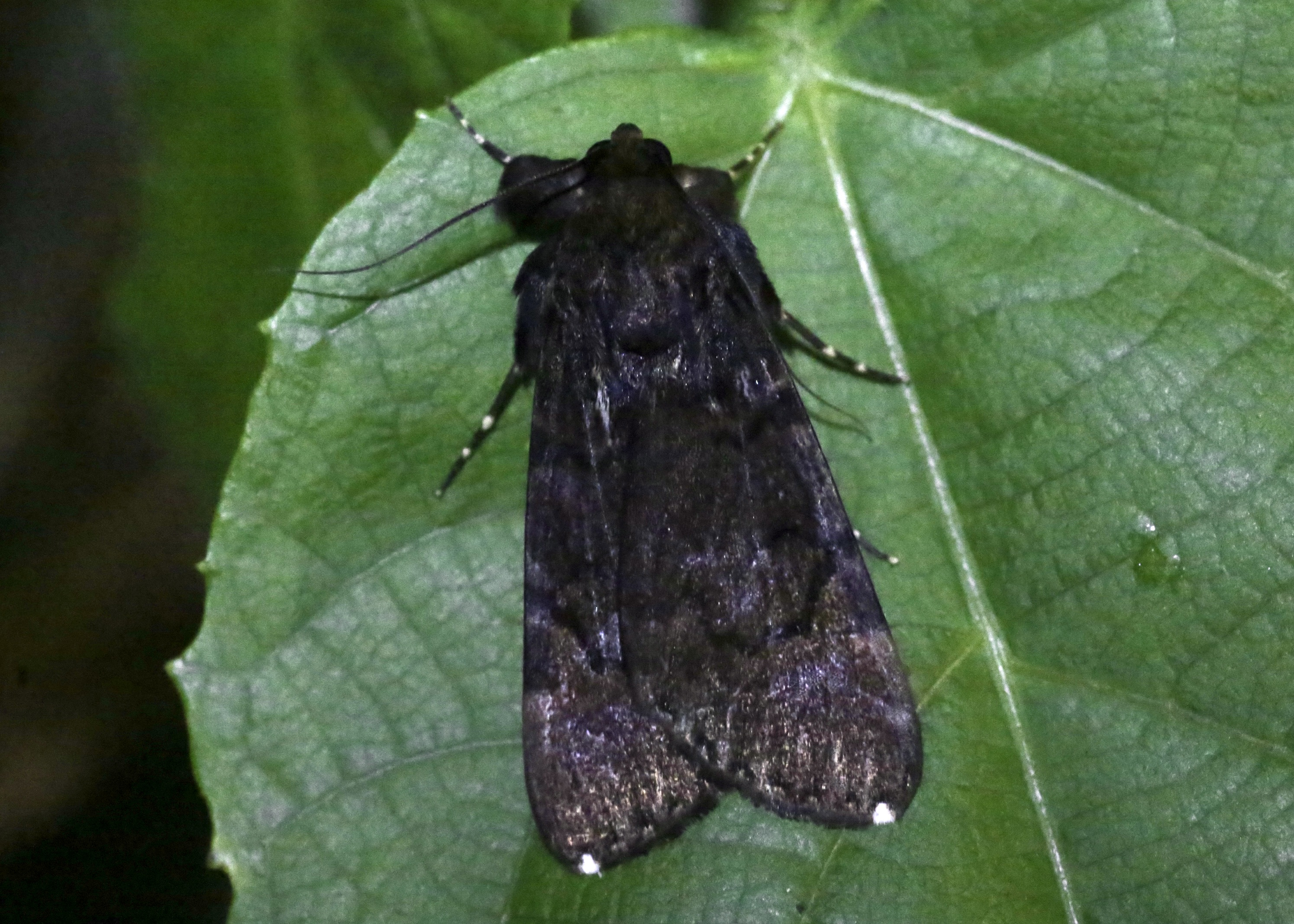

Scientific classification
- Kingdom: Animalia
- Phylum: Arthropoda
- Class: Insecta
- Order: Lepidoptera
- Superfamily: Noctuoidea
- Family: Erebidae
- Genus: Audea
- Species: A. bipunctata

Binomial name
- Audea bipunctata Walker, 1858

Synonyms
- Audea hypostigmata Hampson, 1913; Audea fatua (Felder and Rogenhofer, 1874); Phoberia fatua Felder and Rogenhofer, 1874; Audea bipunctata ab. abbreviata Strand, 1913

= Audea bipunctata =

Species of moth

Audea bipunctata is a species of moth in the family Erebidae. It is found in central and southern Africa (Democratic Republic of Congo (Katanga), Kenya, Malawi, Mozambique, Sierra Leone, South Africa (KwaZulu-Natal), Sudan, Tanzania and Zimbabwe.
