= Paroruza =

Scientific classification
- Kingdom: Animalia
- Phylum: Arthropoda
- Class: Insecta
- Order: Lepidoptera
- Superfamily: Noctuoidea
- Family: Noctuidae
- Subfamily: Acontiinae
- Genus: Paroruza; Hampson, 1902
- Species: P. subductata

Binomial name
- Paroruza subductata (Walker, 1861)

Genus of moths

Paroruza is a monotypic moth genus of the family Noctuidae erected by George Hampson in 1902. Its only species, Paroruza subductata, was first described by Francis Walker in 1861. It is found in South Africa.
