= Tetracme truncataria =

Scientific classification
- Kingdom: Animalia
- Phylum: Arthropoda
- Class: Insecta
- Order: Lepidoptera
- Superfamily: Noctuoidea
- Family: Erebidae
- Subfamily: Hypeninae
- Genus: Tetracme; Hampson, 1902
- Species: T. truncataria

Binomial name
- Tetracme truncataria (Walker, 1861)

Genus of moths

Tetracme is a monotypic moth genus of the family Erebidae erected by George Hampson in 1902. Its only species, Tetracme truncataria, was first described by Francis Walker in 1861. It is found in South Africa.
