= Parasiccia =

Scientific classification
- Kingdom: Animalia
- Phylum: Arthropoda
- Class: Insecta
- Order: Lepidoptera
- Superfamily: Noctuoidea
- Family: Erebidae
- Subfamily: Arctiinae
- Tribe: Lithosiini
- Genus: Parasiccia; Hampson, 1900

Genus of moths

Parasiccia is a genus of moths in the subfamily Arctiinae.

Type species: Parasiccia maculifascia (Moore, 1878)

== Species ==
Some species of this genus are:

- Parasiccia abraxina Rothschild 1913
- Parasiccia atroalba Strand 1922
- Parasiccia atrosuffusa Strand 1922
- Parasiccia chinensis Daniel 1951
- Parasiccia coreana Bryk 1948
- Parasiccia dentata Wileman 1911
- Parasiccia formosibia Strand 1917
- Parasiccia fuscipennis Hampson 1914
- Parasiccia maculata (Poujade 1886)
- Parasiccia maculifascia (Moore, 1878)
- Parasiccia marginipuncta (Talbot, 1926)
- Parasiccia mokanshanensis Reich 1957
- Parasiccia nebulosa Wileman 1914
- Parasiccia nocturna Hampson 1900
- Parasiccia ochrorubens (Mabille, 1900)
- Parasiccia perirrorata Hampson 1903
- Parasiccia punctatissima ( Poujade 1886)
- Parasiccia punctilinea Wileman, 1911
- Parasiccia shirakii Matsumura 1930

== Former species ==
- Parasiccia altaica (Lederer 1855)
- Parasiccia fasciata (Butler 1877)
