= A. carnea =

A. carnea may refer to:

- Acrapex carnea, an owlet moth
- Aesculus carnea, a hybrid tree
- Alpinia carnea, a plant that grows from a rhizome
- Amaryllis carnea, a rain lily
- Amphiura carnea, a brittle star
- Androsace carnea, a flowering plant
- Apios carnea, a flowering plant
- Asura carnea, a moth in the subfamily Arctiinae
