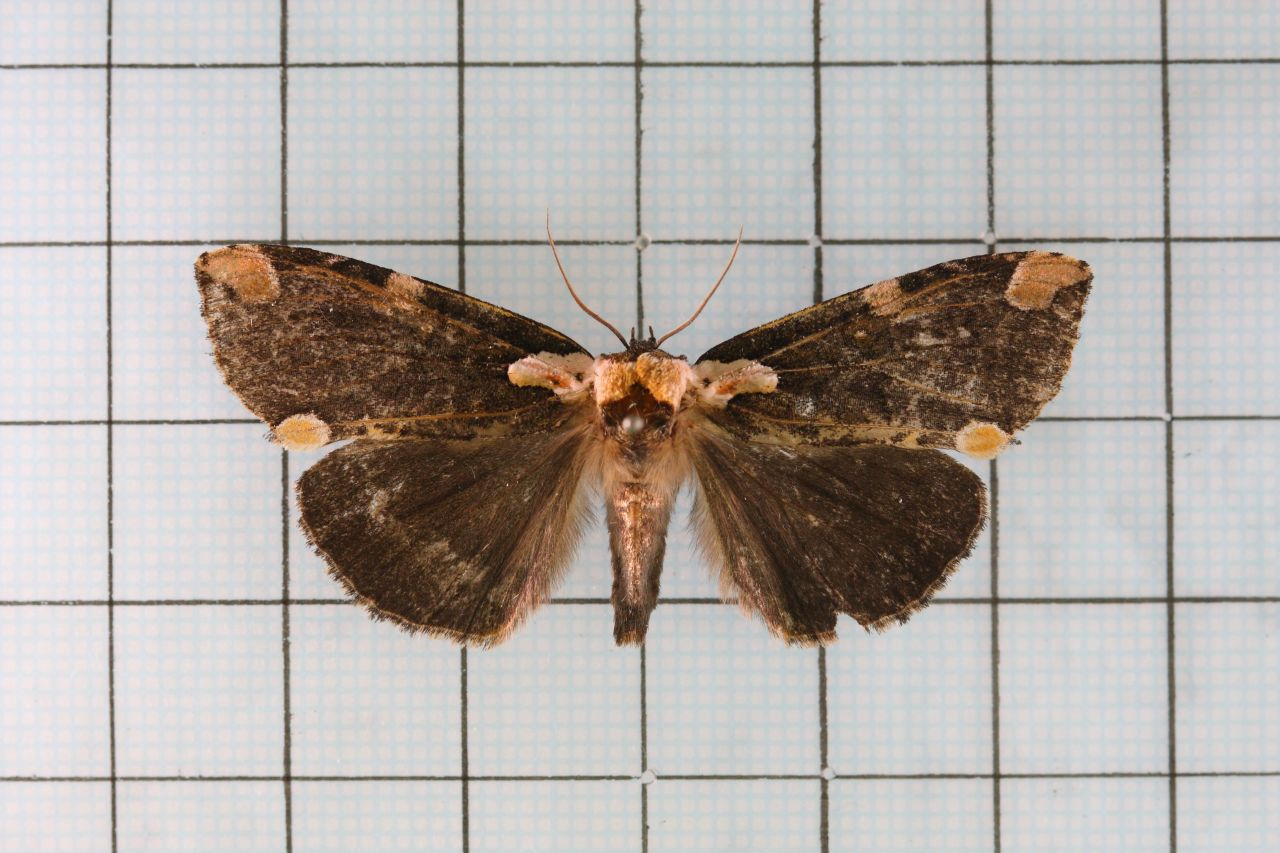

Scientific classification
- Domain: Eukaryota
- Kingdom: Animalia
- Phylum: Arthropoda
- Class: Insecta
- Order: Lepidoptera
- Family: Drepanidae
- Genus: Macrothyatira
- Species: M. flavida

Binomial name
- Macrothyatira flavida (Butler, 1885)

Synonyms
- Thyatira flavida Butler, 1885; Thyatira tapaischana Sick, 1941

= Macrothyatira flavida =

Species of false owlet moth

Macrothyatira flavida is a moth in the family Drepanidae first described by Arthur Gardiner Butler in 1885. It is found in the Russian Far East (southern Sakhalin, southern Kuriles), Taiwan, Japan and China (Henan, Shaanxi, Ningxia, Gansu, Zhejiang, Hubei, Hunan, Fujian, Sichuan, Yunnan).

The wingspan is 37–44 mm (1.5–1.7 in). Adults are similar to Macrothyatira stramineata, but considerably smaller and much duller, the hindwings suffused with dull brownish grey.

== Subspecies ==
- Macrothyatira flavida flavida (Taiwan, Japan, south-eastern Russia)
- Macrothyatira flavida tapaischana (Sick, 1941) (China: Henan, Shaanxi, Ningxia, Gansu, Zhejiang, Hubei, Hunan, Fujian, Sichuan, Yunnan)
