= Macrothyatira labiata =

Scientific classification
- Domain: Eukaryota
- Kingdom: Animalia
- Phylum: Arthropoda
- Class: Insecta
- Order: Lepidoptera
- Family: Drepanidae
- Genus: Macrothyatira
- Species: M. labiata

Binomial name
- Macrothyatira labiata (Gaede, 1930)

Synonyms
- Thyatira labiata Gaede, 1930

Species of false owlet moth

Macrothyatira labiata is a moth in the family Drepanidae first described by Max Gaede in 1930. It is found in Myanmar, China (Sichuan, Yunnan) and Thailand. The Global Lepidoptera Names Index has this name as a synonym of Macrothyatira oblonga.
