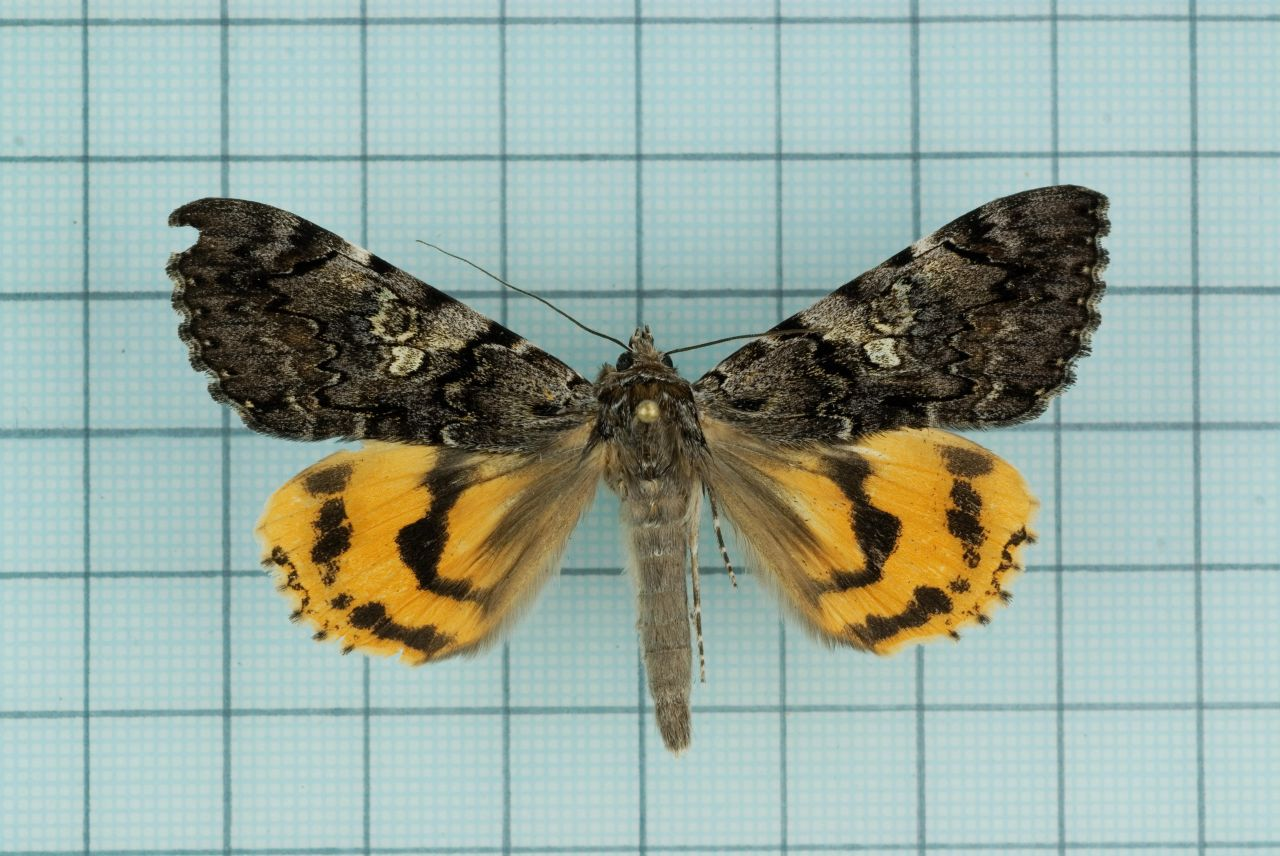
- Catocala armandi shirozui

Scientific classification
- Kingdom: Animalia
- Phylum: Arthropoda
- Clade: Pancrustacea
- Class: Insecta
- Order: Lepidoptera
- Superfamily: Noctuoidea
- Family: Erebidae
- Genus: Catocala
- Species: C. armandi

Binomial name
- Catocala armandi Poujade, 1888

Synonyms
- Catocala davidi Poujade, 1887

= Catocala armandi =

Species of moth

Catocala armandi is a moth of the family Erebidae. It is found in south-east Asia, including Tibet and Taiwan.

The wingspan is about 80 mm.

== Subspecies ==
- Catocala armandi armandi
- Catocala armandi shirozui Sugi, 1982 (Taiwan)
