= Herochroma sinapiaria =

Scientific classification
- Kingdom: Animalia
- Phylum: Arthropoda
- Class: Insecta
- Order: Lepidoptera
- Family: Geometridae
- Genus: Herochroma
- Species: H. sinapiaria

Binomial name
- Herochroma sinapiaria (Poujade, 1895)

Synonyms
- Hypochroma sinapiaria Poujade, 1895; Pseudoterpna sinapiaria by Leech, 1897; Archaeobalbis sinapiaria by Prout, 1912

Species of moth

Herochroma sinapiaria is a species of moth of the family Geometridae first described by Gustave Arthur Poujade in 1895. It is found in the Chinese provinces of Shaanxi, Hunan, Yunnan, Sichuan and Xizang.
