= Aemene punctatissima =

Scientific classification
- Kingdom: Animalia
- Phylum: Arthropoda
- Clade: Pancrustacea
- Class: Insecta
- Order: Lepidoptera
- Superfamily: Noctuoidea
- Family: Erebidae
- Subfamily: Arctiinae
- Genus: Aemene
- Species: A. punctatissima

Binomial name
- Aemene punctatissima Poujade, 1886

Synonyms
- Aemene punctatissima ab. atroalba Strand, 1922; Aemene punctatissima ab. atrosuffusa Strand, 1922

Species of moth

Aemene punctatissima is a moth of the family Erebidae. It was described by Gustave Arthur Poujade in 1886. It is found in China (Yichang, Changyang, Washan, Mount Emei, Leshan, Wasukou, Cheton and Niton).
