= Parasiccia chinensis =

Scientific classification
- Domain: Eukaryota
- Kingdom: Animalia
- Phylum: Arthropoda
- Class: Insecta
- Order: Lepidoptera
- Superfamily: Noctuoidea
- Family: Erebidae
- Subfamily: Arctiinae
- Genus: Parasiccia
- Species: P. chinensis

Binomial name
- Parasiccia chinensis Daniel, 1951

Synonyms
- Aemene chinensis

Species of moth

Parasiccia chinensis is a moth of the subfamily Arctiinae. It was described by Franz Daniel in 1951. It is found in Zhejiang, China.
