= Aemene maculata =

Scientific classification
- Domain: Eukaryota
- Kingdom: Animalia
- Phylum: Arthropoda
- Class: Insecta
- Order: Lepidoptera
- Superfamily: Noctuoidea
- Family: Erebidae
- Subfamily: Arctiinae
- Genus: Aemene
- Species: A. maculata

Binomial name
- Aemene maculata (Poujade, 1886)

Synonyms
- Nola maculata Poujade, 1886; Parasiccia formosibia Strand, 1917; Parasiccia maculata

Species of moth

Aemene maculata is a moth of the family Erebidae. It was described by Gustave Arthur Poujade in 1886. It is found in western China and Taiwan.
