= Acrapex metaphaea =

Scientific classification
- Kingdom: Animalia
- Phylum: Arthropoda
- Class: Insecta
- Order: Lepidoptera
- Superfamily: Noctuoidea
- Family: Noctuidae
- Genus: Acrapex
- Species: A. metaphaea

Binomial name
- Acrapex metaphaea Hampson, 1910

Species of moth

Acrapex metaphaea is a species of moth of the family Noctuidae first described by George Hampson in 1910. It is found in Africa, including Zimbabwe and South Africa.

The wingspan is about 26 mm.

== Description ==
Head and thorax ochreous tinged with rufous and mixed with some black brown; palpi dark brown; abdomen dorsally dark brown, ventrally ochreous tinged with rufous. Forewing rufous, the costal area, median nervure and veins arising from it, and inner margin suffused with dark brown, slight white points in and beyond lower angle of cell; traces of a subterminal series of black points, a slight oblique dark shade from termen below apex; a terminal series of black points. Hindwing dark reddish brown, the cilia with fine pale line at base; the underside greyish suffused and sprinkled with fuscous.
