= Acrapex roseotincta =

Scientific classification
- Kingdom: Animalia
- Phylum: Arthropoda
- Class: Insecta
- Order: Lepidoptera
- Superfamily: Noctuoidea
- Family: Noctuidae
- Genus: Acrapex
- Species: A. roseotincta

Binomial name
- Acrapex roseotincta Hampson, 1910

Species of moth

Acrapex roseotincta is a species of moth of the family Noctuidae first described by George Hampson in 1910. It is found in Sri Lanka.

The wingspan is about 22 mm.

== Description ==
Head and thorax ochreous tinged with brown; abdomen ochreous white. Forewing pale ochreous yellow faintly tinged with rufous and the veins slightly streaked with rufous; a slight blackish streak below the basal half of the cell; some black scales at the lower angle of the cell; an oblique postmedial series of black points on veins 6 to 1; an oblique diffused rufous fascia from termen below apex to vein 3; a slight brown terminal line; cilia yellowish white with a faint brownish line through them. Hindwing white faintly tinged with ochreous; the underside white with the costal area tinged with ochreous.
