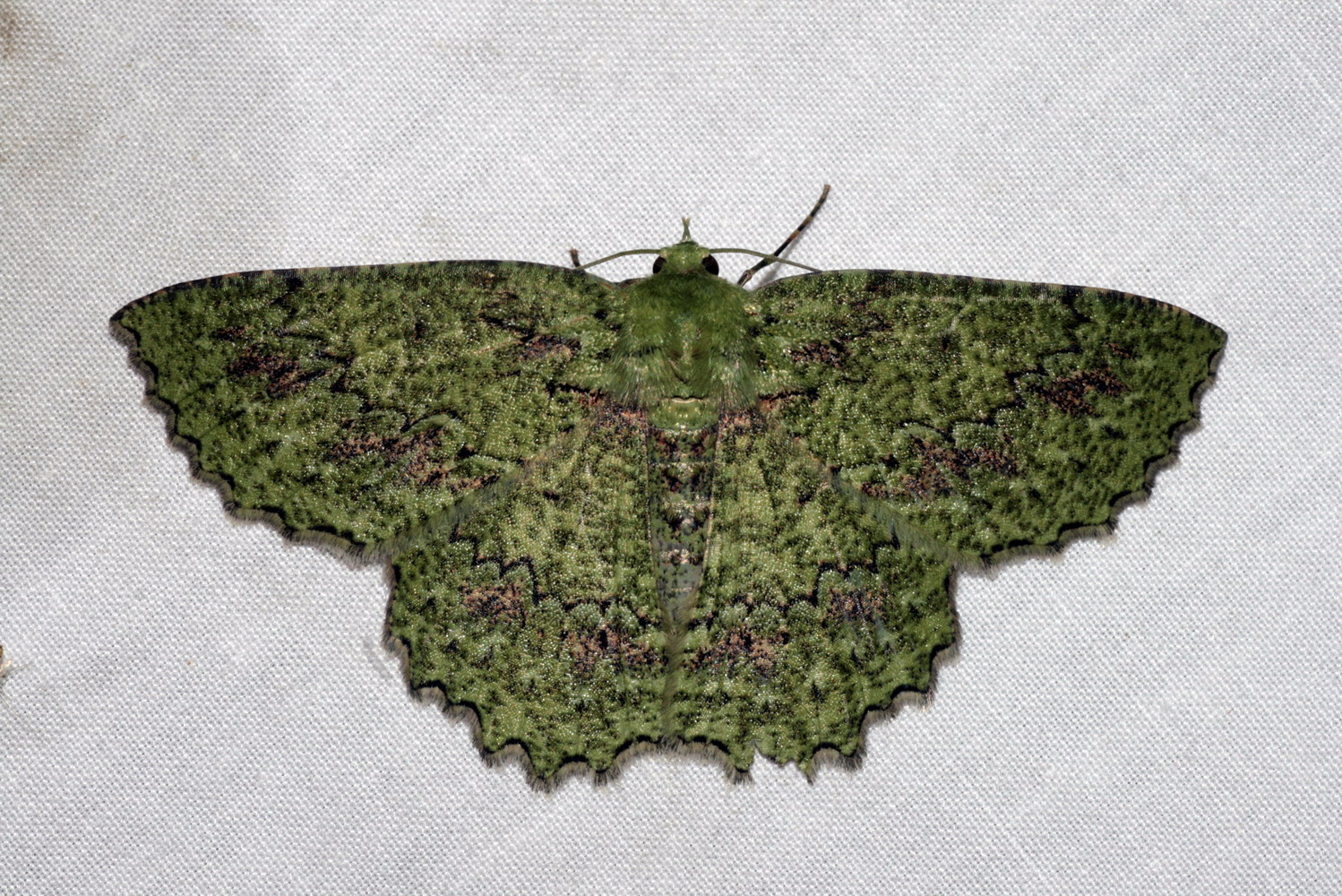

Scientific classification
- Kingdom: Animalia
- Phylum: Arthropoda
- Class: Insecta
- Order: Lepidoptera
- Family: Geometridae
- Tribe: Pseudoterpnini
- Genus: Herochroma; C. Swinhoe, 1893

Synonyms
- Archaeobalbis L. B. Prout, 1912; Neobalbis L. B. Prout, 1912; Chloroclydon Warren, 1894

= Herochroma =

Genus of moths

Herochroma is a genus of moths in the family Geometridae. The genus was described by Charles Swinhoe in 1893.

== Species ==
- baba group
  - Herochroma aethalia (L. B. Prout, 1927)
  - Herochroma baba C. Swinhoe, 1893
  - Herochroma baibarana (Matsumura, 1931)
  - Herochroma crassipunctata (Alphéraky, 1888)
    - Herochroma crassipunctata crassipunctata (Alphéraky, 1888)
    - Herochroma crassipunctata farinosa (Warren, 1893)
  - Herochroma cristata (Warren, 1894)
    - Herochroma cristata cristata (Warren, 1894)
    - Herochroma cristata rubicunda Inoue, 1999
  - Herochroma curvata Han & Xue, 2003
  - Herochroma elaearia (Hampson, 1903)
  - Herochroma holelaica (L. B. Prout, 1935)
  - Herochroma nigrescentipalpis (L. B. Prout, 1916)
  - Herochroma ochreipicta (C. Swinhoe, 1905)
  - Herochroma pallensia Han & Xue, 2003
  - Herochroma perspicillata Han & Xue, 2003
  - Herochroma pseudocristata Inoue, 1999
  - Herochroma scoblei (Inoue, 1992)
  - Herochroma serrativalva (Holloway, 1982)
  - Herochroma sinapiaria (Poujade, 1895)
  - Herochroma subspoliata (L. B. Prout, 1916)
  - Herochroma subtepens (Walker, 1860)
  - Herochroma subviridaria (Yazaki, 1994)
  - Herochroma supraviridaria Inoue, 1999
  - Herochroma urapteraria (Walker, 1860)
  - Herochroma usneata (Felder & Rogenhofer, 1875)
  - Herochroma viridaria (Moore, 1868)
    - Herochroma viridaria viridaria (Moore, 1868)
    - Herochroma viridaria peperata (Herbulot, 1989)
  - Herochroma xuthopletes (L. B. Prout, 1934)
  - Herochroma yazakii Inoue, 1999
- flavibasalis group
  - Herochroma aeruginosa Inoue, 1999
  - Herochroma clariscripta Holloway, 1996
  - Herochroma flavibasalis (Warren, 1894)
  - Herochroma hemiticheres (L. B. Prout, 1935)
  - Herochroma mansfieldi (L. B. Prout, 1939)
  - Herochroma rosulata Han & Xue, 2003
