= Herochroma elaearia =

Scientific classification
- Kingdom: Animalia
- Phylum: Arthropoda
- Class: Insecta
- Order: Lepidoptera
- Family: Geometridae
- Genus: Herochroma
- Species: H. elaearia

Binomial name
- Herochroma elaearia (Hampson, 1903)

Synonyms
- Pseudoterpna elaearia Hampson, 1903

Species of moth

Herochroma elaearia is a moth of the family Geometridae, first described by George Hampson in 1903. It is found in Sikkim, India.
