= Acrapex rhabdoneura =

Scientific classification
- Kingdom: Animalia
- Phylum: Arthropoda
- Class: Insecta
- Order: Lepidoptera
- Superfamily: Noctuoidea
- Family: Noctuidae
- Genus: Acrapex
- Species: A. rhabdoneura

Binomial name
- Acrapex rhabdoneura Hampson, 1910

Species of moth

Acrapex rhabdoneura is a species of moth of the family Noctuidae first described by George Hampson in 1910. It is found in Africa, including Kenya.

The wingspan is 22–26 mm.

== Description ==
Head, thorax, and abdomen pale ochreous slightly tinged with rufous; palpi dark brown. Forewing pale ochreous slightly irrorated (sprinkled) with brown; the costal edge and interspaces of costal area suffused with reddish brown; a diffused red-brown fascia in and below cell to near termen where it meets an oblique brown fascia from termen below apex to vein 2 with a pale oblique fascia before it from apex; a white streak on extremity of median nervure slightly hooked on discocellulars; the veins beyond the cell streaked with white to the subterminal fascia; a fine red-brown terminal line; cilia brown mixed with ochreous. Hindwing pure white; the underside with the costal area tinged with ochreous.
