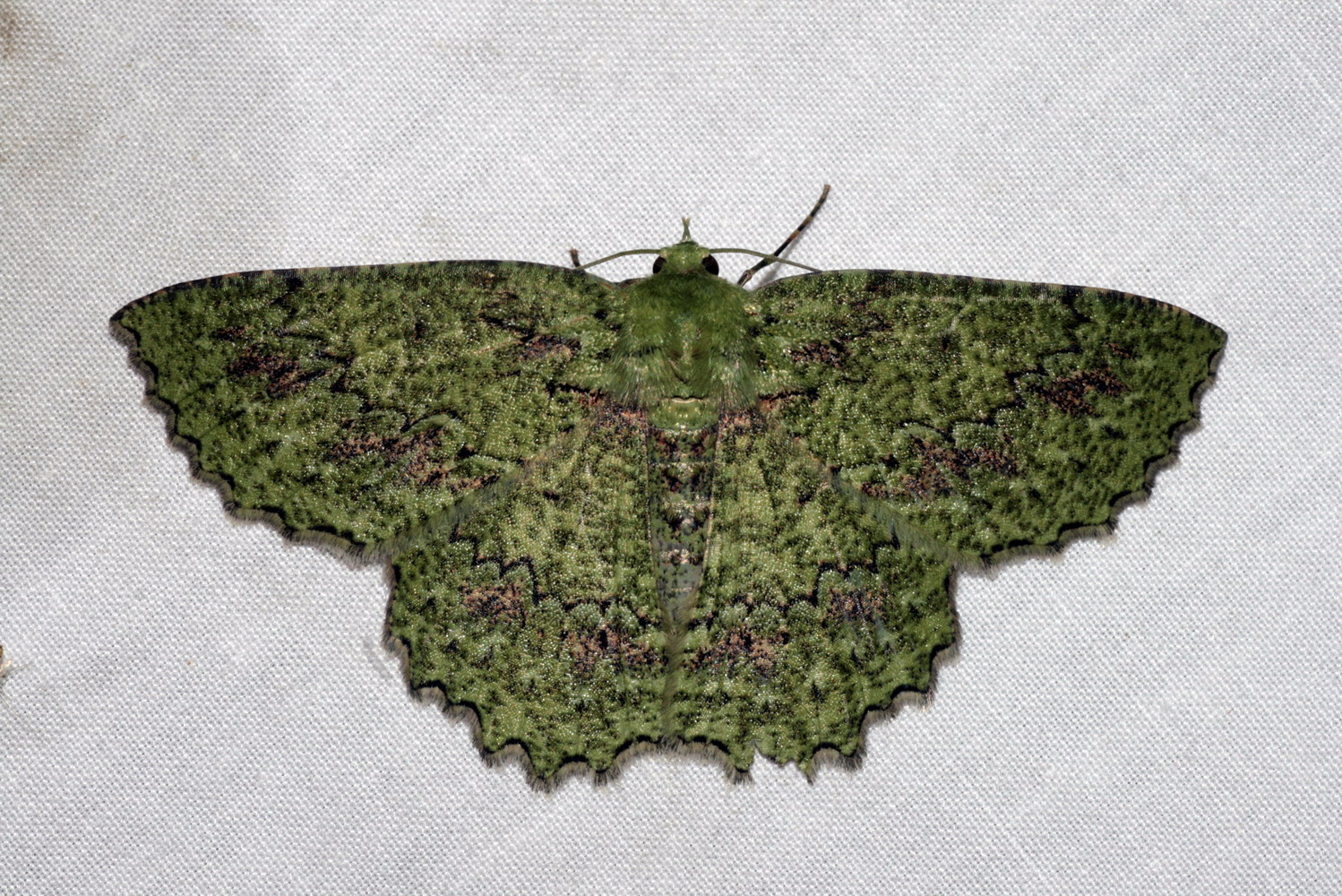

Scientific classification
- Kingdom: Animalia
- Phylum: Arthropoda
- Class: Insecta
- Order: Lepidoptera
- Family: Geometridae
- Genus: Herochroma
- Species: H. baibarana

Binomial name
- Herochroma baibarana (Matsumura, 1931)

Synonyms
- Dindica baibarana Matsumura, 1931; Archaeobalbis cristata Holloway, 1976, nec Warren, 1894; Archaeobalbis orientalis Holloway, 1982; Archaeobalbis baibarana Inoue, 1986; Herochroma orientalis Holloway, 1996

= Herochroma baibarana =

Species of moth

Herochroma baibarana is a species of moth of the family Geometridae first described by Shōnen Matsumura in 1931. It is found in China, Taiwan, Sri Lanka, the north-eastern parts of the Himalayas, Peninsular Malaysia, Sumatra and Borneo.
