= Herochroma usneata =

Scientific classification
- Kingdom: Animalia
- Phylum: Arthropoda
- Class: Insecta
- Order: Lepidoptera
- Family: Geometridae
- Genus: Herochroma
- Species: H. usneata

Binomial name
- Herochroma usneata (Felder & Rogenhofer, 1875)

Synonyms
- Scotopteryx usneata Felder & Rogenhofer, 1875; Pseudoterpna hypoglauca Hampson, 1895

Species of moth

Herochroma usneata is a moth of the family Geometridae first described by Felder and Rogenhofer in 1875. It is found in northern India.
