= Herochroma subtepens =

Scientific classification
- Kingdom: Animalia
- Phylum: Arthropoda
- Class: Insecta
- Order: Lepidoptera
- Family: Geometridae
- Genus: Herochroma
- Species: H. subtepens

Binomial name
- Herochroma subtepens (Walker, 1860)

Synonyms
- Hypochroma subtepens Walker, 1860; Archaeobalbis subtepens; Dindica subtepens formosicola Matsumura, 1931

Species of moth

Herochroma subtepens is a moth of the family Geometridae first described by Francis Walker in 1860. It is found on Borneo, Sumatra and Peninsular Malaysia. The habitat consists of lowland and lower montane forests.
