= Macrothyatira arizana =

Scientific classification
- Domain: Eukaryota
- Kingdom: Animalia
- Phylum: Arthropoda
- Class: Insecta
- Order: Lepidoptera
- Family: Drepanidae
- Genus: Macrothyatira
- Species: M. arizana

Binomial name
- Macrothyatira arizana (Wileman, 1910)

Synonyms
- Thyatira arizana Wileman, 1910; Thyatira diminuta Houlbert, 1921

Species of false owlet moth

Macrothyatira arizana is a moth in the family Drepanidae first described by Wileman in 1910. It is found in Taiwan and the Chinese provinces of Sichuan and Yunnan.

== Subspecies ==
- Macrothyatira arizana arizana (Taiwan)
- Macrothyatira arizana diminuta (Houlbert, 1921) (China: Sichuan, Yunnan)
