= Herochroma pseudocristata =

Scientific classification
- Kingdom: Animalia
- Phylum: Arthropoda
- Class: Insecta
- Order: Lepidoptera
- Family: Geometridae
- Genus: Herochroma
- Species: H. pseudocristata

Binomial name
- Herochroma pseudocristata Inoue, 1999

Species of moth

Herochroma pseudocristata is a moth of the family Geometridae first described by Hiroshi Inoue in 1999. It is known from the Philippines.
