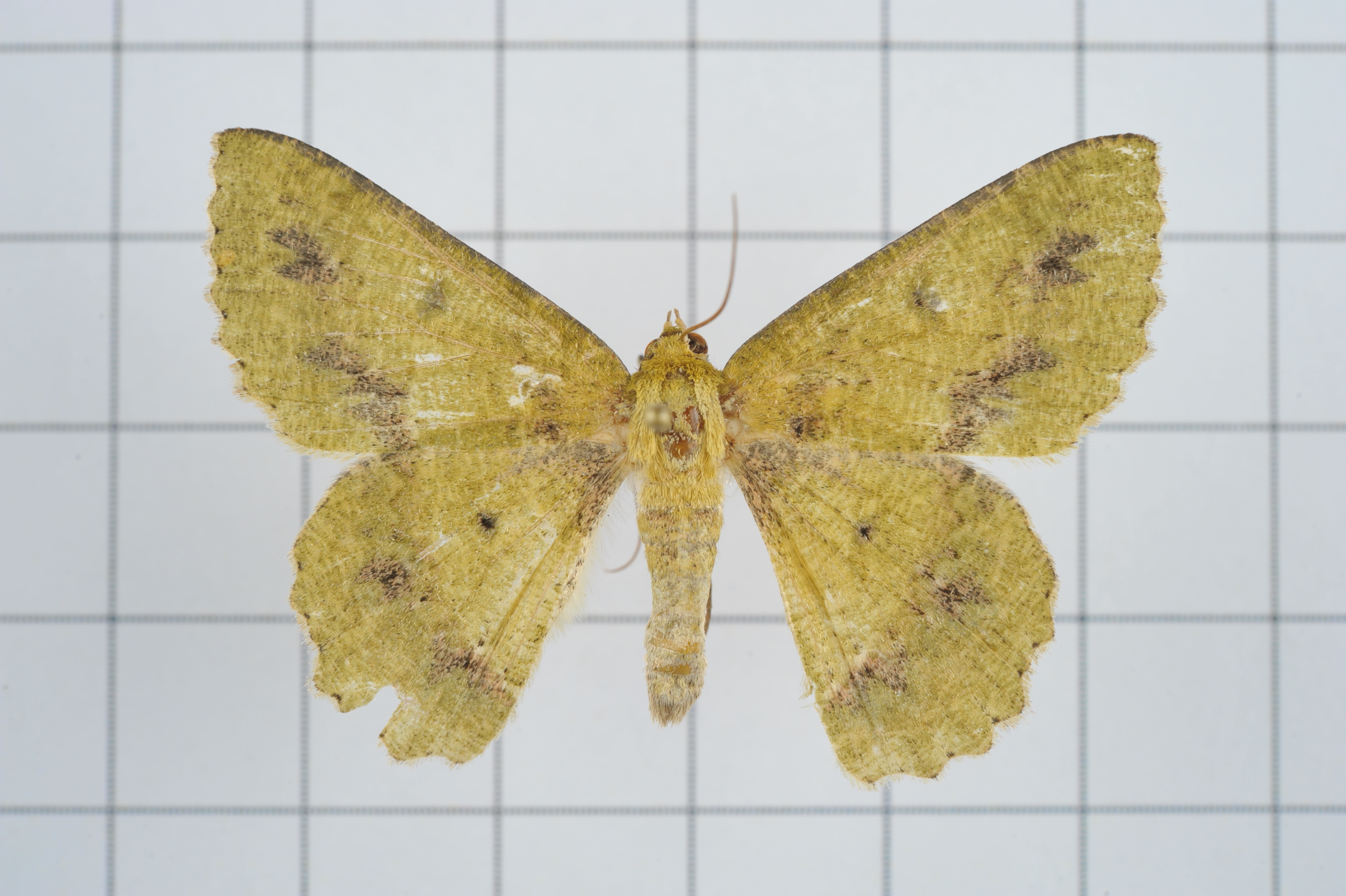

Scientific classification
- Kingdom: Animalia
- Phylum: Arthropoda
- Class: Insecta
- Order: Lepidoptera
- Family: Geometridae
- Genus: Herochroma
- Species: H. cristata

Binomial name
- Herochroma cristata (Warren, 1905)

Synonyms
- Actenochroma cristata Warren, 1905; Actenochroma subopalina Warren, 1894

= Herochroma cristata =

Species of moth

Herochroma cristata is a species of moth of the family Geometridae first described by William Warren in 1905. It is found in China (Hainan, Guangxi, Sichuan), Japan (Ryukyu Islands: Yaeyama Islands), Taiwan, Northeast India, Bhutan, Nepal, Thailand, northern Vietnam, and Indonesia.

== Subspecies ==
There are two subspecies:

- Herochroma cristata cristata (Warren, 1905)
- Herochroma cristata rubicunda Inoue 1999
