= Aemene taeniata =

Scientific classification
- Domain: Eukaryota
- Kingdom: Animalia
- Phylum: Arthropoda
- Class: Insecta
- Order: Lepidoptera
- Superfamily: Noctuoidea
- Family: Erebidae
- Subfamily: Arctiinae
- Genus: Aemene
- Species: A. taeniata

Binomial name
- Aemene taeniata Fixsen, 1887

Synonyms
- Eugoa taeniata

Species of moth

Aemene taeniata is a moth of the family Erebidae first described by Johann Heinrich Fixsen in 1887. It is found in the Russian Far East (Middle Amur, Primorye) and Korea.
