= Herochroma rosulata =

Scientific classification
- Kingdom: Animalia
- Phylum: Arthropoda
- Clade: Pancrustacea
- Class: Insecta
- Order: Lepidoptera
- Family: Geometridae
- Genus: Herochroma
- Species: H. rosulata

Binomial name
- Herochroma rosulata H.X. Han & D.Y. Xue, 2003

Species of moth

Herochroma rosulata is a species of moth of the family Geometridae. It was first described by Han Hongxiang and Xue Dayong in 2003. It is found in Hainan, China.

The length of the forewings is 24–25 mm.
