= Macrothyatira oblonga =

Scientific classification
- Domain: Eukaryota
- Kingdom: Animalia
- Phylum: Arthropoda
- Class: Insecta
- Order: Lepidoptera
- Family: Drepanidae
- Genus: Macrothyatira
- Species: M. oblonga

Binomial name
- Macrothyatira oblonga (Poujade, 1887)

Synonyms
- Thyatira oblonga Poujade, 1887; Thyatira hoenei Sick, 1941

Species of false owlet moth

Macrothyatira oblonga is a moth in the family Drepanidae first described by Gustave Arthur Poujade in 1887. It is found in the Chinese provinces of Sichuan and Yunnan.

The forewings are dark greyish fuscous with wavy cross lines. The basal patch is small, projecting in the middle somewhat in the shape of a duck's beak. There is a small white spot at the middle of the costa and a large and a small white spot on the inner margin, often united. There is also an oblique rounded white apical patch and a small flattened anal patch. The wavy dark transverse lines are alternated with paler spaces and the outer and subterminal lines are edged with grey. The terminal lunules are dark with grey edges. The hindwings are fuscous tinged with luteous and there is a darker obscurely marked subterminal band.
