= Herochroma pallensia =

Scientific classification
- Kingdom: Animalia
- Phylum: Arthropoda
- Clade: Pancrustacea
- Class: Insecta
- Order: Lepidoptera
- Family: Geometridae
- Genus: Herochroma
- Species: H. pallensia

Binomial name
- Herochroma pallensia H.X. Han & D.Y. Xue, 2003

Species of moth

Herochroma pallensia is a species of moth of the family Geometridae. It was first described by Han Hongxiang and Xue Dayong in 2003. It is found in the Chinese provinces of Hunan, Fujian, and Guangxi.

The length of the forewings is 21.5–23 mm for males.
