= Herochroma nigrescentipalpis =

Scientific classification
- Kingdom: Animalia
- Phylum: Arthropoda
- Clade: Pancrustacea
- Class: Insecta
- Order: Lepidoptera
- Family: Geometridae
- Genus: Herochroma
- Species: H. nigrescentipalpis

Binomial name
- Herochroma nigrescentipalpis (L. B. Prout, 1916)

Synonyms
- Archaeobalbis nigrescentipalpis Prout, 1916

Species of moth

Herochroma nigrescentipalpis is a moth of the family Geometridae first described by Louis Beethoven Prout in 1916. It is found on Sulawesi.
