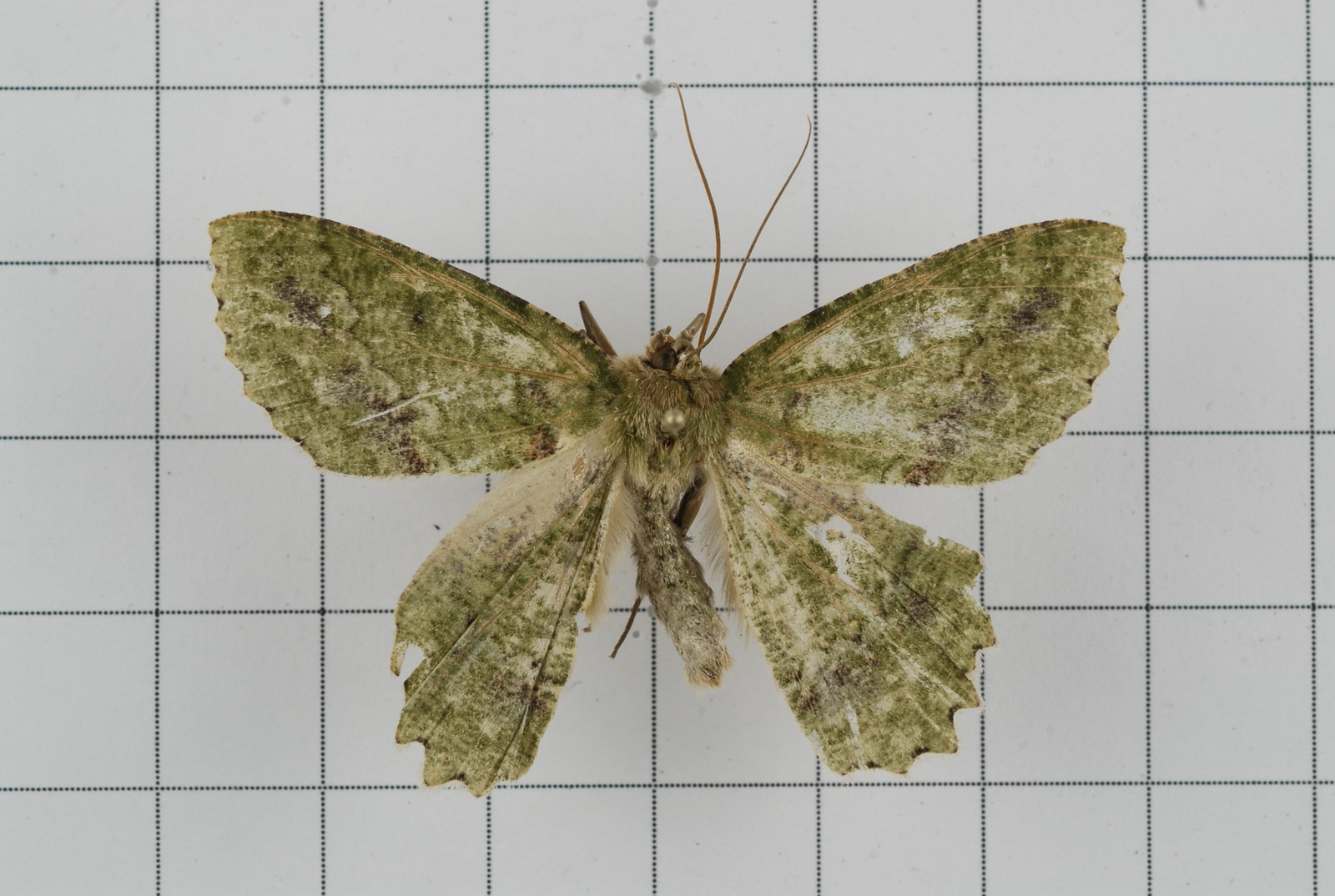

Scientific classification
- Kingdom: Animalia
- Phylum: Arthropoda
- Class: Insecta
- Order: Lepidoptera
- Family: Geometridae
- Genus: Herochroma
- Species: H. viridaria

Binomial name
- Herochroma viridaria Moore, 1867

Synonyms
- Archaeobalbis viridaria peperata Herbulot, 1989; Archaeobalpis peperata Yazaki, 1994; Actenochroma subochracea Warren, 1894

= Herochroma viridaria =

Species of moth

Herochroma viridaria is a species of moth of the family Geometridae first described by Frederic Moore in 1867. It is found in Malaysia, northern Thailand, northern Vietnam, Nepal and the Chinese provinces of Fujian, Hainan, Guangxi and Sichuan.

== Subspecies ==
- Herochroma viridaria peperata (Herbulot, 1989)
- Herochroma viridaria viridaria Moore, 1867
