= Acrapex leucophlebia =

Scientific classification
- Kingdom: Animalia
- Phylum: Arthropoda
- Class: Insecta
- Order: Lepidoptera
- Superfamily: Noctuoidea
- Family: Noctuidae
- Genus: Acrapex
- Species: A. leucophlebia

Binomial name
- Acrapex leucophlebia Hampson, 1894

Species of moth

Acrapex leucophlebia is a species of moth of the family Noctuidae first described by George Hampson in 1894. It is found in the Nilgiri Mountains of India.

The wingspan is 26–32 mm.

== Description ==
Head and thorax ocherous mixed with brown; abdomen ocherous white slightly irrorated (sprinkled) with brown. Forewing ocherous white irrorated with red brown, the veins defined by slight brown streaks except on inner area; a slight brown streak below basal half of cell; the discocellulars with some brown points before and beyond them; a diffused oblique whitish fascia from apex to discal fold with a brown shade below it from termen below apex, with short brown streaks on its inner edge above and below vein 5; a terminal series of minute black lunulae; cilia whitish at base, dark at tips. Hindwing ocherous white tinged with reddish brown except on costal area; cilia ocherous white; the underside ocherous white slightly tinged with red brown.
