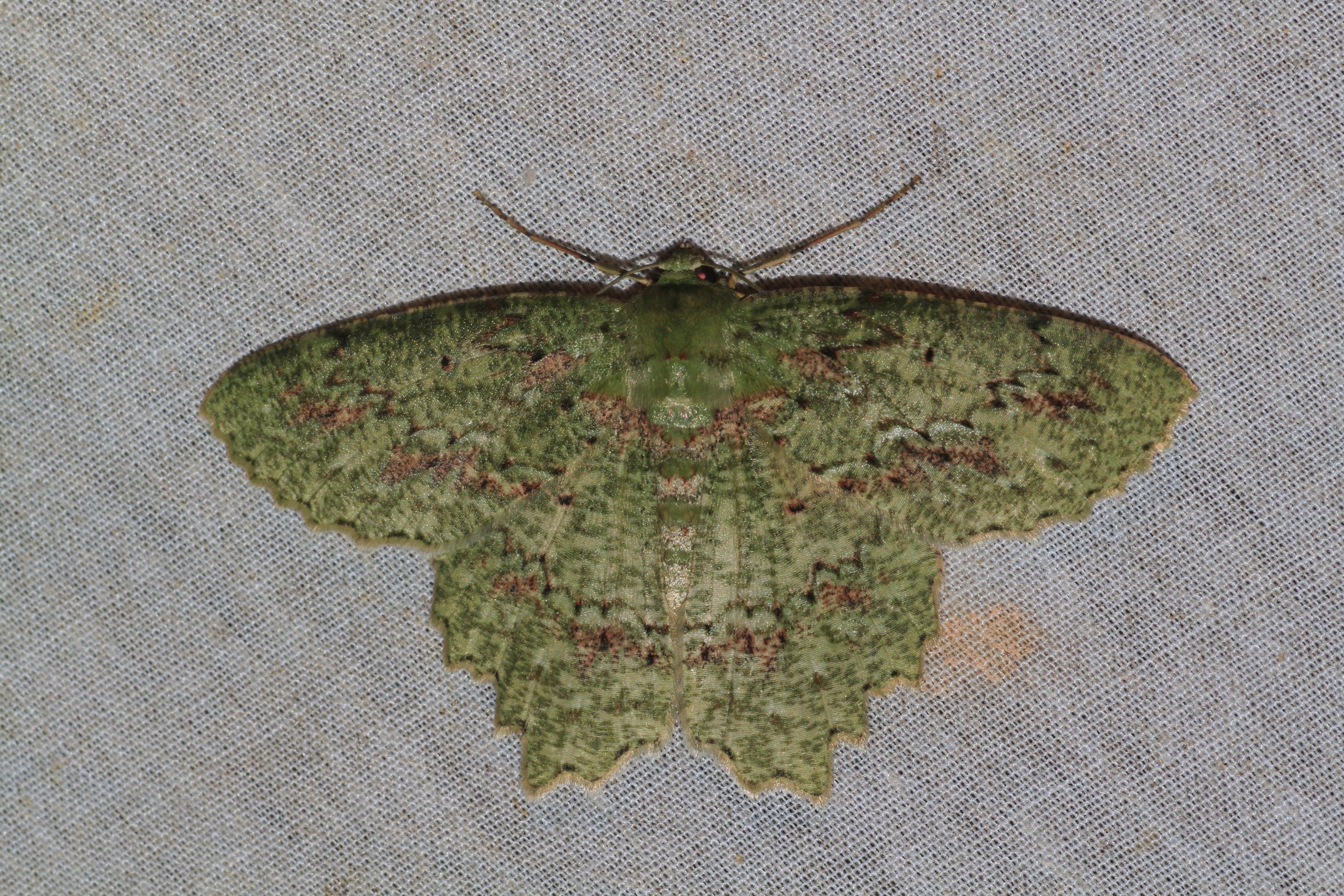
- Male
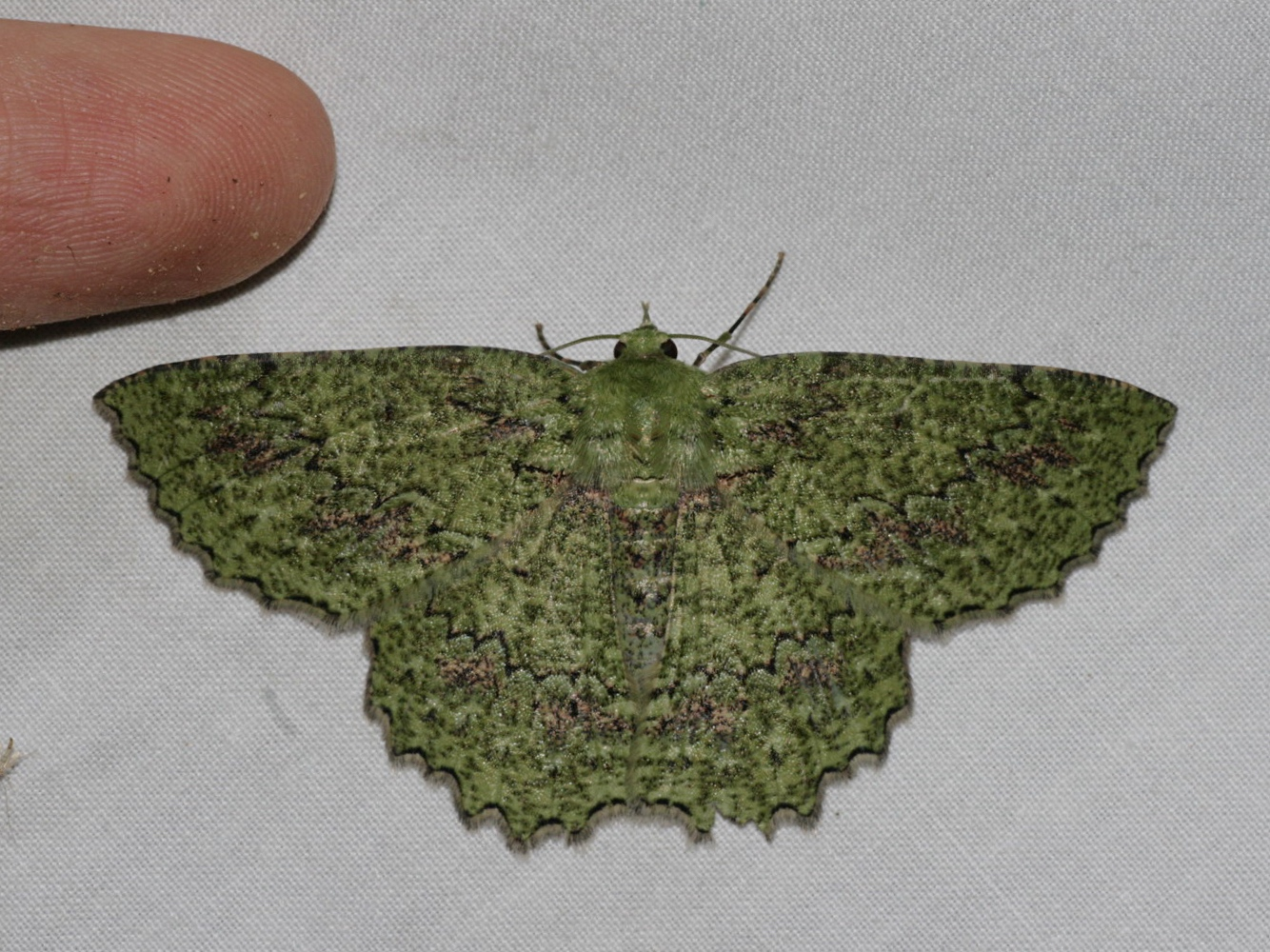
- Female

Scientific classification
- Kingdom: Animalia
- Phylum: Arthropoda
- Class: Insecta
- Order: Lepidoptera
- Family: Geometridae
- Genus: Herochroma
- Species: H. urapteraria

Binomial name
- Herochroma urapteraria (Walker, 1860)

Synonyms
- Hypochroma urapteraria Walker, 1860; Archaeobalbis urapteraria eudicheres Prout, 1916

= Herochroma urapteraria =

Species of moth

Herochroma urapteraria is a moth of the family Geometridae first described by Francis Walker in 1860. It is found in Sundaland. The habitat consists of lower and upper montane forests.
