= Herochroma aethalia =

Scientific classification
- Kingdom: Animalia
- Phylum: Arthropoda
- Clade: Pancrustacea
- Class: Insecta
- Order: Lepidoptera
- Family: Geometridae
- Genus: Herochroma
- Species: H. aethalia

Binomial name
- Herochroma aethalia (L. B. Prout, 1927)

Synonyms
- Archaeobalbis aethalia Prout, 1927

Species of moth

Herochroma aethalia is a moth of the family Geometridae first described by Louis Beethoven Prout in 1927. It is found on Sumatra in Indonesia.
