= Herochroma aeruginosa =

Scientific classification
- Kingdom: Animalia
- Phylum: Arthropoda
- Class: Insecta
- Order: Lepidoptera
- Family: Geometridae
- Genus: Herochroma
- Species: H. aeruginosa

Binomial name
- Herochroma aeruginosa Inoue, 1999

Species of moth

Herochroma aeruginosa is a moth of the family Geometridae first described by Hiroshi Inoue in 1999. It is found in the Philippines.
