= Acrapex albivena =

Scientific classification
- Kingdom: Animalia
- Phylum: Arthropoda
- Class: Insecta
- Order: Lepidoptera
- Superfamily: Noctuoidea
- Family: Noctuidae
- Genus: Acrapex
- Species: A. albivena

Binomial name
- Acrapex albivena Hampson, 1910

Species of moth

Acrapex albivena is a species of moth of the family Noctuidae first described by George Hampson in 1910. It is found in Africa, including South Africa.

The wingspan is about 35 mm.

== Description ==
Head and thorax black brown mixed with some ochreous; tarsi with slight pale rings; abdomen pale ochreous mixed with brown. Forewing ochreous whitish suffused and sprinkled with black brown leaving whitish streaks on the veins; a whitish streak in discal fold from near base to near termen, then bent upwards to apex; a diffused rufous fascia above vein 1; a terminal series of slight black points; cilia whitish at base, blackish at tips. Hindwing whitish suffused with fuscous brown; the underside whitish sprinkled with brown.
