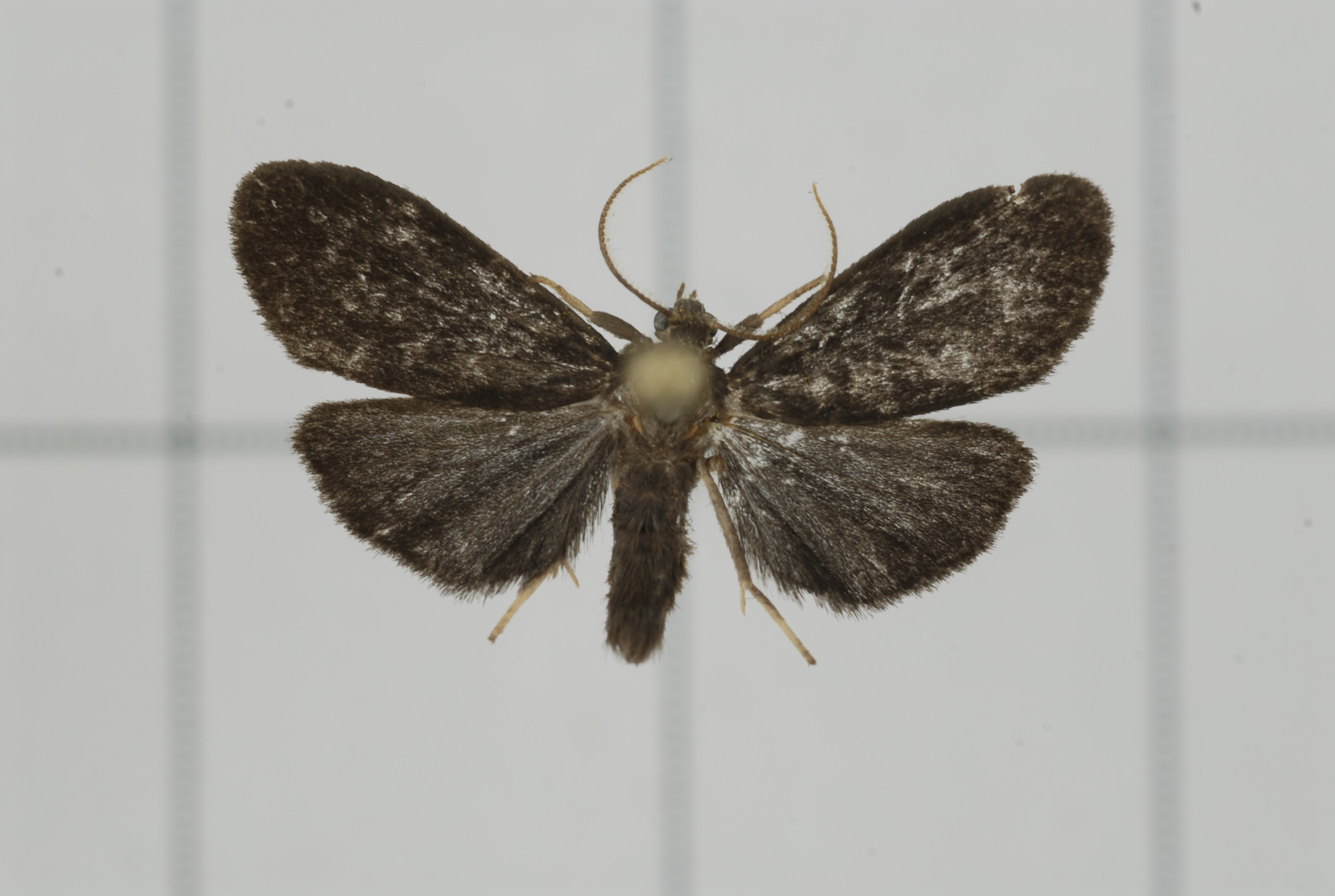

Scientific classification
- Kingdom: Animalia
- Phylum: Arthropoda
- Class: Insecta
- Order: Lepidoptera
- Superfamily: Noctuoidea
- Family: Erebidae
- Subfamily: Arctiinae
- Genus: Parasiccia
- Species: P. fuscipennis

Binomial name
- Parasiccia fuscipennis Hampson, 1914

Synonyms
- Aemene fuscipennis

= Parasiccia fuscipennis =

Species of moth

Parasiccia fuscipennis is a moth of the subfamily Arctiinae. It was described by George Hampson in 1914. It is found in Taiwan.
