= Herochroma scoblei =

Scientific classification
- Kingdom: Animalia
- Phylum: Arthropoda
- Class: Insecta
- Order: Lepidoptera
- Family: Geometridae
- Genus: Herochroma
- Species: H. scoblei

Binomial name
- Herochroma scoblei (Inoue, 1992)

Synonyms
- Archaeobalbis scoblei Inoue, 1992

Species of moth

Herochroma scoblei is a moth of the family Geometridae first described by Hiroshi Inoue in 1992. It is found on Sulawesi, Indonesia.
