= Herochroma subviridaria =

Scientific classification
- Kingdom: Animalia
- Phylum: Arthropoda
- Class: Insecta
- Order: Lepidoptera
- Family: Geometridae
- Genus: Herochroma
- Species: H. subviridaria

Binomial name
- Herochroma subviridaria (Yazaki, 1994)

Synonyms
- Archaeobalbis subviridaria Yazaki, 1994

Species of moth

Herochroma subviridaria is a moth of the family Geometridae first described by Yazaki in 1994. It is found in Asia.
