= Herochroma serrativalva =

Scientific classification
- Kingdom: Animalia
- Phylum: Arthropoda
- Clade: Pancrustacea
- Class: Insecta
- Order: Lepidoptera
- Family: Geometridae
- Genus: Herochroma
- Species: H. serrativalva

Binomial name
- Herochroma serrativalva (Holloway, 1982)

Synonyms
- Archaeobalbis serrativalva Holloway, 1982

Species of moth

Herochroma serrativalva is a moth of the family Geometridae first described by Jeremy Daniel Holloway in 1982. It is found in Malaysia.
