= Herochroma clariscripta =

Scientific classification
- Kingdom: Animalia
- Phylum: Arthropoda
- Clade: Pancrustacea
- Class: Insecta
- Order: Lepidoptera
- Family: Geometridae
- Genus: Herochroma
- Species: H. clariscripta

Binomial name
- Herochroma clariscripta Holloway, 1996

Species of moth

Herochroma clariscripta is a moth of the family Geometridae first described by Jeremy Daniel Holloway in 1996. It is found on Borneo.

The wingspan is 20–28 mm for males and about 23 mm for females.
