= Aemene amnaea =

Scientific classification
- Domain: Eukaryota
- Kingdom: Animalia
- Phylum: Arthropoda
- Class: Insecta
- Order: Lepidoptera
- Superfamily: Noctuoidea
- Family: Erebidae
- Subfamily: Arctiinae
- Genus: Aemene
- Species: A. amnaea

Binomial name
- Aemene amnaea C. Swinhoe, 1894

Synonyms
- Hyposiccia amnaea

Species of moth

Aemene amnaea is a moth of the family Erebidae. It was described by Charles Swinhoe in 1894. It is found in Assam, India.
