= Acrapex lepta =

Scientific classification
- Domain: Eukaryota
- Kingdom: Animalia
- Phylum: Arthropoda
- Class: Insecta
- Order: Lepidoptera
- Superfamily: Noctuoidea
- Family: Noctuidae
- Genus: Acrapex
- Species: A. lepta

Binomial name
- Acrapex lepta Krüger, 2005

Species of moth

Acrapex lepta is a moth of the family Noctuidae first described by Martin Krüger in 2005. It is endemic to Lesotho.
