= Aemene mesozonata =

Scientific classification
- Kingdom: Animalia
- Phylum: Arthropoda
- Class: Insecta
- Order: Lepidoptera
- Superfamily: Noctuoidea
- Family: Erebidae
- Subfamily: Arctiinae
- Genus: Aemene
- Species: A. mesozonata

Binomial name
- Aemene mesozonata Hampson, 1898

Species of moth

Aemene mesozonata is a moth of the family Erebidae. It was described by George Hampson in 1898. It is found in Assam, India.
