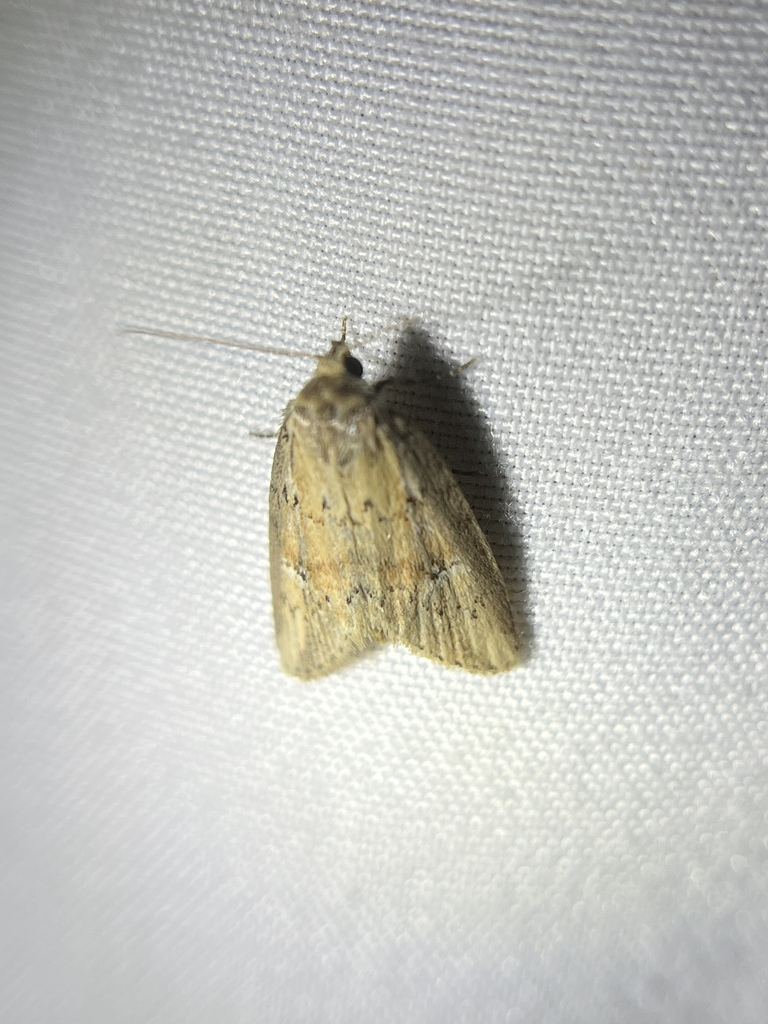

Scientific classification
- Kingdom: Animalia
- Phylum: Arthropoda
- Class: Insecta
- Order: Lepidoptera
- Superfamily: Noctuoidea
- Family: Noctuidae
- Genus: Acrapex
- Species: A. relicta

Binomial name
- Acrapex relicta Ferguson, 1991

= Acrapex relicta =

Species of moth

Acrapex relicta is a moth of the family Noctuidae. It is found in South Carolina, North Carolina and south-eastern Virginia.

The length of the forewings is 7.5–10 mm for males and 8.5–10 mm for females.
