= Herochroma mansfieldi =

Scientific classification
- Kingdom: Animalia
- Phylum: Arthropoda
- Clade: Pancrustacea
- Class: Insecta
- Order: Lepidoptera
- Family: Geometridae
- Genus: Herochroma
- Species: H. mansfieldi

Binomial name
- Herochroma mansfieldi (L. B. Prout, 1939)

Synonyms
- Neobalbis mansfieldi Prout, 1939

Species of moth

Herochroma mansfieldi is a moth of the family Geometridae first described by Louis Beethoven Prout in 1939. It is found in Yunnan and Hubei, both in China.

The length of the forewings is about 29 mm.
