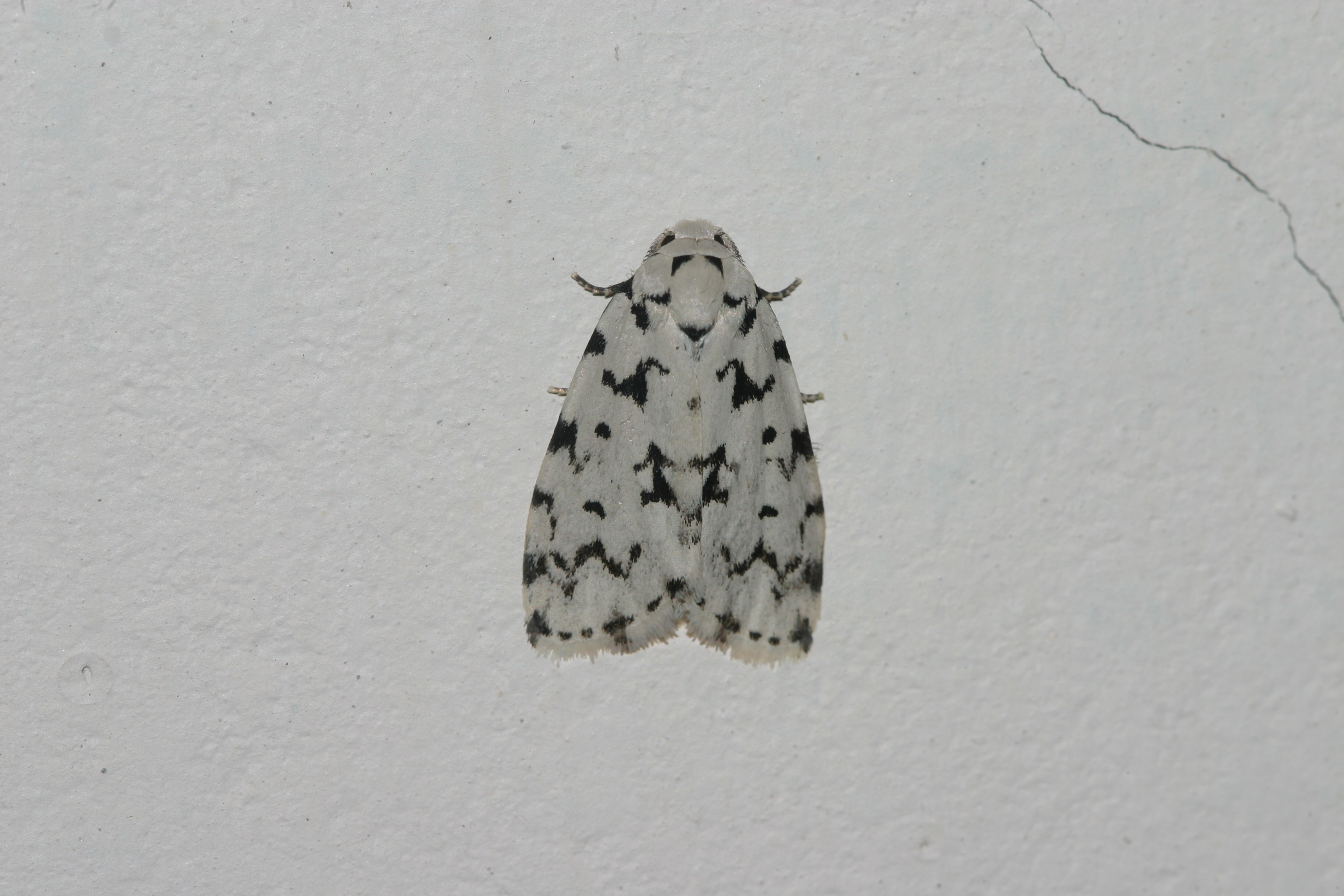

Scientific classification
- Kingdom: Animalia
- Phylum: Arthropoda
- Class: Insecta
- Order: Lepidoptera
- Superfamily: Noctuoidea
- Family: Erebidae
- Subfamily: Arctiinae
- Genus: Aemene
- Species: A. taprobanis

Binomial name
- Aemene taprobanis Walker, 1854

Synonyms
- Panassa cingalesa Walker, 1865; Autoceras grammophora Felder, 1874; Aemene sinuata Moore, 1878; Siccia taprobanis likiangensis Daniel, 1951

= Aemene taprobanis =

Species of moth

Aemene taprobanis is a moth of the family Erebidae, described by Francis Walker in 1854. It is found in China (Li-Kiang), the north-western Himalayas, India (Sikkim, Assam, Mumbai), Sri Lanka and Malacca.

== Description ==
Head and thorax grey. Tegula usually with a black speck. Forewings grey, more or less suffused with fuscous. Waved sub-basal, antemedial, medial and postmedial black lines present. Postmedial lines excurved round the end of cell and then bent inwards to near the medial band and with some diffused streaks beyond it. A series of marginal specks and a black spot at center of cell and another at end of it. Hindwings pale and more or less suffused with fuscous.

== Subspecies ==
- Aemene taprobanis taprobanis
- Aemene taprobanis likiangensis (Daniel, 1951) (China: Li-Kiang)
