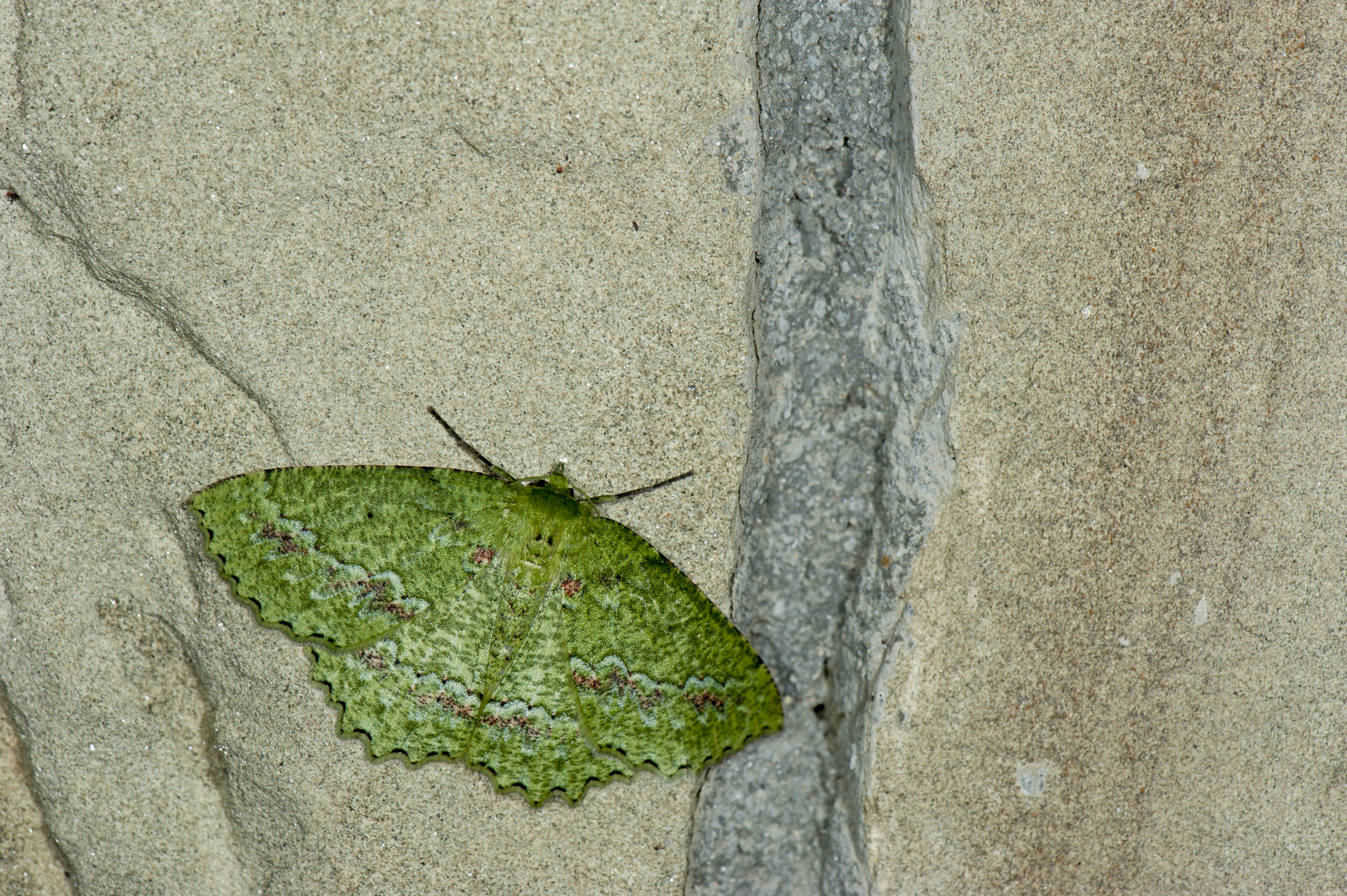

Scientific classification
- Kingdom: Animalia
- Phylum: Arthropoda
- Class: Insecta
- Order: Lepidoptera
- Family: Geometridae
- Genus: Herochroma
- Species: H. supraviridaria

Binomial name
- Herochroma supraviridaria Inoue, 1999

= Herochroma supraviridaria =

Species of moth

Herochroma supraviridaria is a species of moth of the family Geometridae first described by Hiroshi Inoue in 1999. It is found in the Chinese provinces of Fujian and Guangxi and in Taiwan.
