= Herochroma yazakii =

Scientific classification
- Kingdom: Animalia
- Phylum: Arthropoda
- Class: Insecta
- Order: Lepidoptera
- Family: Geometridae
- Genus: Herochroma
- Species: H. yazakii

Binomial name
- Herochroma yazakii Inoue, 1999

Species of moth

Herochroma yazakii is a species of moth of the family Geometridae, first described by Hiroshi Inoue in 1999. It lives in northeastern India, Nepal, northern Thailand and the Chinese provinces of Sichuan and Yunnan.
