= Parasiccia nocturna =

Scientific classification
- Kingdom: Animalia
- Phylum: Arthropoda
- Class: Insecta
- Order: Lepidoptera
- Superfamily: Noctuoidea
- Family: Erebidae
- Subfamily: Arctiinae
- Genus: Parasiccia
- Species: P. nocturna

Binomial name
- Parasiccia nocturna Hampson, 1900

Species of moth

Parasiccia nocturna is a moth of the subfamily Arctiinae. It was described by George Hampson in 1900. It is found in Assam, India.
