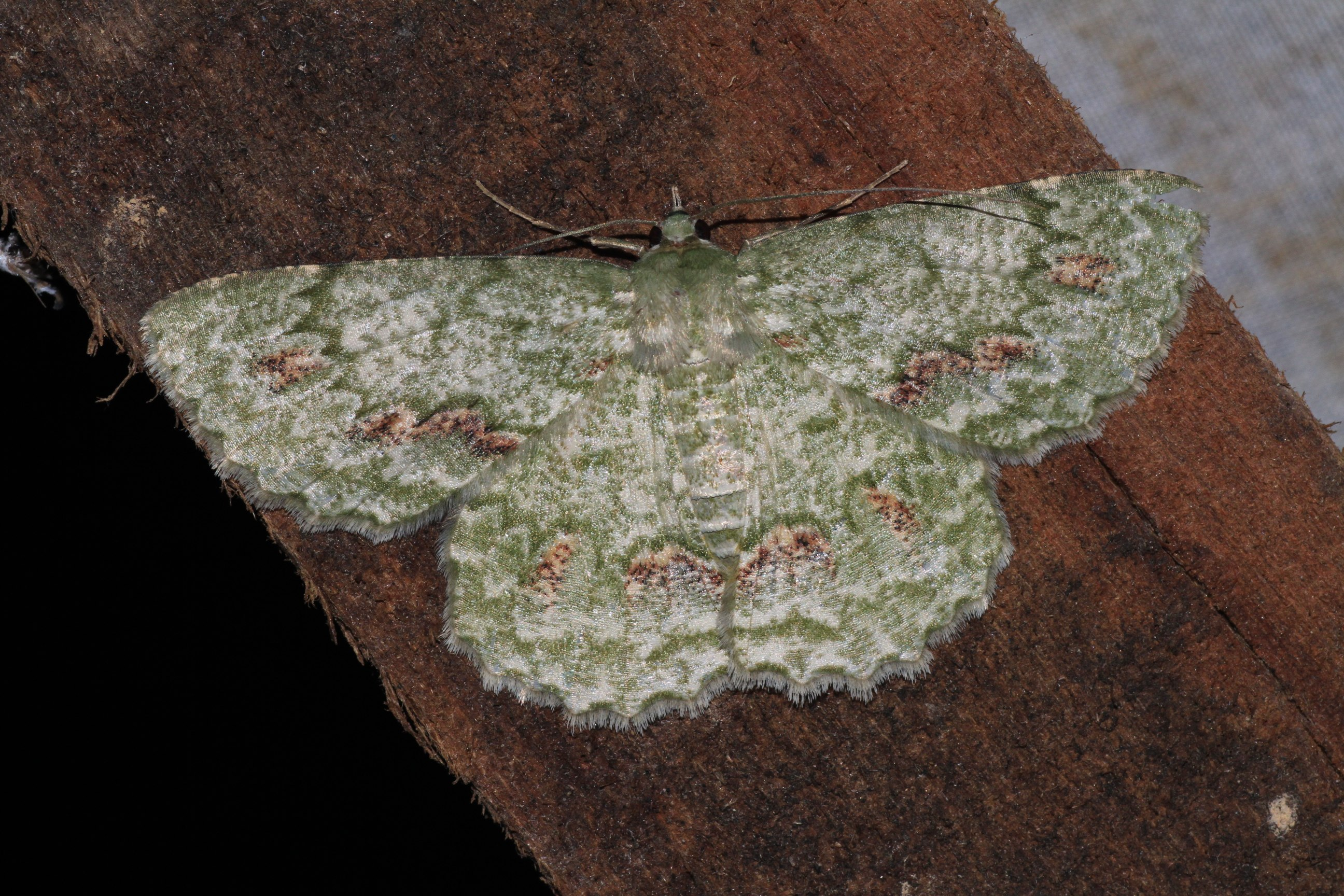

Scientific classification
- Kingdom: Animalia
- Phylum: Arthropoda
- Class: Insecta
- Order: Lepidoptera
- Family: Geometridae
- Genus: Herochroma
- Species: H. flavibasalis

Binomial name
- Herochroma flavibasalis (Warren, 1894)

Synonyms
- Actenochroma flavibasalis Warren, 1894; Neobalbis bipunctata Thierry-Mieg, 1915

= Herochroma flavibasalis =

Species of moth

Herochroma flavibasalis is a moth of the family Geometridae first described by William Warren in 1894. It is found in Sundaland. The habitat consists of lowland and lower montane forests.
