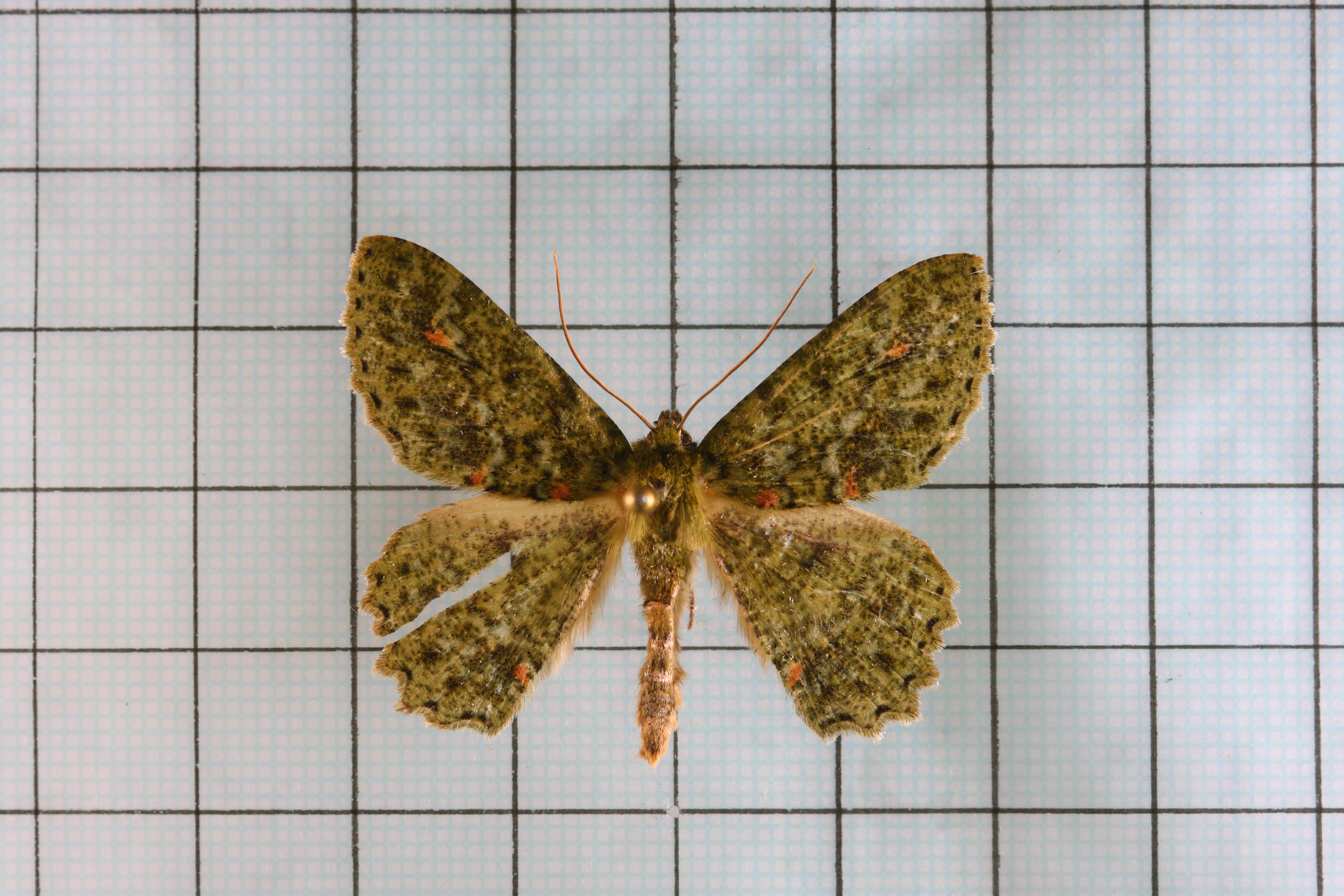

Scientific classification
- Kingdom: Animalia
- Phylum: Arthropoda
- Class: Insecta
- Order: Lepidoptera
- Family: Geometridae
- Genus: Herochroma
- Species: H. ochreipicta

Binomial name
- Herochroma ochreipicta (C. Swinhoe, 1905)

Synonyms
- Actenochroma ochreipicta C. Swinhoe, 1905; Pseudoterpna ochreipicta Hampson, 1907; Archaeobalbis ochreipicta Prout, 1912; Actenochroma montana Bastelberger, 1911; Neobalbis montana Prout, 1912; Archaeobalbis ochreipicta montana Prout, 1932

= Herochroma ochreipicta =

Species of moth

Herochroma ochreipicta is a species of moth of the family Geometridae first described by Charles Swinhoe in 1905. It is found in China (Fujian, Guangxi, Yunnan), Taiwan, north-eastern India, Nepal and northern Vietnam.
