= Herochroma holelaica =

Scientific classification
- Kingdom: Animalia
- Phylum: Arthropoda
- Clade: Pancrustacea
- Class: Insecta
- Order: Lepidoptera
- Family: Geometridae
- Genus: Herochroma
- Species: H. holelaica

Binomial name
- Herochroma holelaica (L. B. Prout, 1935)

Synonyms
- Archaeobalbis holelaica Prout, 1935

Species of moth

Herochroma holelaica is a moth of the family Geometridae first described by Louis Beethoven Prout in 1935. It lives on Java.
