= Macrothyatira conspicua =

Scientific classification
- Domain: Eukaryota
- Kingdom: Animalia
- Phylum: Arthropoda
- Class: Insecta
- Order: Lepidoptera
- Family: Drepanidae
- Genus: Macrothyatira
- Species: M. conspicua

Binomial name
- Macrothyatira conspicua (Leech, 1900)

Synonyms
- Thyatira conspicua Leech, 1900

Species of false owlet moth

Macrothyatira conspicua is a moth in the family Drepanidae first described by John Henry Leech in 1900. It is found in the Chinese provinces of Shaanxi, Zhejiang, Hunan, Fujian, Sichuan and Yunnan and in Taiwan.

The forewings are pale fuscous brown, traversed by faint wavy lines. There is an irregularly shaped white basal patch, marked with black spots and outlined with black. The stigmata is white, outlined with black and there is a large white patch at the middle of the costa traversed by short dark lines and another towards the apex preceded and followed by black lines. There are some smaller white spots with black outlines on the outer part of the inner margin. The hindwings are yellowish, with a blackish subterminal band, outwardly diffuse.
