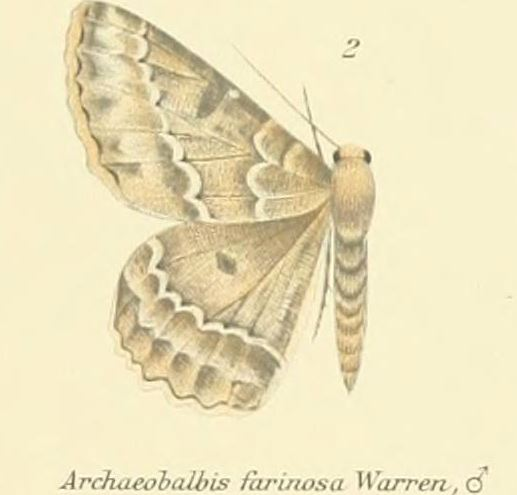
- Herochroma crassipunctata farinosa

Scientific classification
- Kingdom: Animalia
- Phylum: Arthropoda
- Class: Insecta
- Order: Lepidoptera
- Family: Geometridae
- Genus: Herochroma
- Species: H. crassipunctata

Binomial name
- Herochroma crassipunctata (Alphéraky, 1888)

Synonyms
- Gnophos crassipunctata Alphéraky, 1888; Archaeobalbis crassipuncta; Archaeobalbis sordida Wehrli, 1928; Actenochroma farinosa Warren, 1893

= Herochroma crassipunctata =

Species of moth

Herochroma crassipunctata is a moth of the family Geometridae first described by Sergei Alphéraky in 1888. It is found in Turkestan and India.

== Subspecies ==
- Herochroma crassipunctata crassipunctata (Turkestan)
- Herochroma crassipunctata farinosa (Warren, 1893) (northern India)
