= Acrapex prisca =

Scientific classification
- Kingdom: Animalia
- Phylum: Arthropoda
- Class: Insecta
- Order: Lepidoptera
- Superfamily: Noctuoidea
- Family: Noctuidae
- Genus: Acrapex
- Species: A. prisca

Binomial name
- Acrapex prisca (Walker, 1866)

Synonyms
- Leucania prisca Walker, 1866

Species of moth

Acrapex prisca is a moth of the family Noctuidae first described by Francis Walker in 1866. It is endemic to Sri Lanka.
