= Macrothyatira transitans =

Scientific classification
- Domain: Eukaryota
- Kingdom: Animalia
- Phylum: Arthropoda
- Class: Insecta
- Order: Lepidoptera
- Family: Drepanidae
- Genus: Macrothyatira
- Species: M. transitans

Binomial name
- Macrothyatira transitans (Houlbert, 1921)

Synonyms
- Haplothyatira transitans Houlbert, 1921; Paragnorima transitans Houlbert, 1921

Species of false owlet moth

Macrothyatira transitans is a moth in the family Drepanidae first described by Constant Vincent Houlbert in 1921. It is found in Yunnan, China.
