= Macrothyatira fasciata =

Scientific classification
- Domain: Eukaryota
- Kingdom: Animalia
- Phylum: Arthropoda
- Class: Insecta
- Order: Lepidoptera
- Family: Drepanidae
- Genus: Macrothyatira
- Species: M. fasciata

Binomial name
- Macrothyatira fasciata (Houlbert, 1921)

Synonyms
- Melanocraspes fasciata Houlbert, 1921; Macrothyatira fasciata shansiensis Werny, 1966

Species of false owlet moth

Macrothyatira fasciata is a moth in the family Drepanidae. It was first discovered by Constant Vincent Houlbert in 1921. It is found in the following areas of China: Beijing, Shanxi, Henan, Shaanxi, Hubei, Sichuan, Yunnan, and Tibet.
