= Asura carnea =

Scientific classification
- Domain: Eukaryota
- Kingdom: Animalia
- Phylum: Arthropoda
- Class: Insecta
- Order: Lepidoptera
- Superfamily: Noctuoidea
- Family: Erebidae
- Subfamily: Arctiinae
- Genus: Asura
- Species: A. carnea

Binomial name
- Asura carnea (Poujade, 1886)

Synonyms
- Calligenia carnea Poujade, 1886; Setina rubricans Leech, 1890

Species of moth

Asura carnea is a moth of the family Erebidae. It is found in China.
