= Aemene clarimaculata =

Scientific classification
- Kingdom: Animalia
- Phylum: Arthropoda
- Clade: Pancrustacea
- Class: Insecta
- Order: Lepidoptera
- Superfamily: Noctuoidea
- Family: Erebidae
- Subfamily: Arctiinae
- Genus: Aemene
- Species: A. clarimaculata

Binomial name
- Aemene clarimaculata Holloway, 2001

Species of moth

Aemene clarimaculata is a moth of the family Erebidae. It was described by Jeremy Daniel Holloway in 2001. It is found on Borneo. The habitat consists of lowland dipterocarp forests.

The length of the forewings is 8–11 mm for males and females.
