= Parasiccia ochrorubens =

Scientific classification
- Domain: Eukaryota
- Kingdom: Animalia
- Phylum: Arthropoda
- Class: Insecta
- Order: Lepidoptera
- Superfamily: Noctuoidea
- Family: Erebidae
- Subfamily: Arctiinae
- Genus: Parasiccia
- Species: P. ochrorubens

Binomial name
- Parasiccia ochrorubens (Mabille, 1900)

Synonyms
- Miltochrista ochrorubens Mabille, 1900

Species of insect

Parasiccia ochrorubens is a moth of the subfamily Arctiinae. It was described by Paul Mabille in 1900. It is found on Madagascar.
