= Aemene monastyrskii =

Scientific classification
- Kingdom: Animalia
- Phylum: Arthropoda
- Clade: Pancrustacea
- Class: Insecta
- Order: Lepidoptera
- Superfamily: Noctuoidea
- Family: Erebidae
- Subfamily: Arctiinae
- Genus: Aemene
- Species: A. monastyrskii

Binomial name
- Aemene monastyrskii Dubatolov & Bucsek, 2013

Species of moth

Aemene monastyrskii is a moth of the family Erebidae. It is found in Vietnam.
