= Parasiccia shirakii =

Scientific classification
- Kingdom: Animalia
- Phylum: Arthropoda
- Clade: Pancrustacea
- Class: Insecta
- Order: Lepidoptera
- Superfamily: Noctuoidea
- Family: Erebidae
- Subfamily: Arctiinae
- Genus: Parasiccia
- Species: P. shirakii

Binomial name
- Parasiccia shirakii Matsumura, 1930

Species of moth

Parasiccia shirakii is a moth of the subfamily Arctiinae. It was described by Shōnen Matsumura in 1930. It is found in Taiwan.
