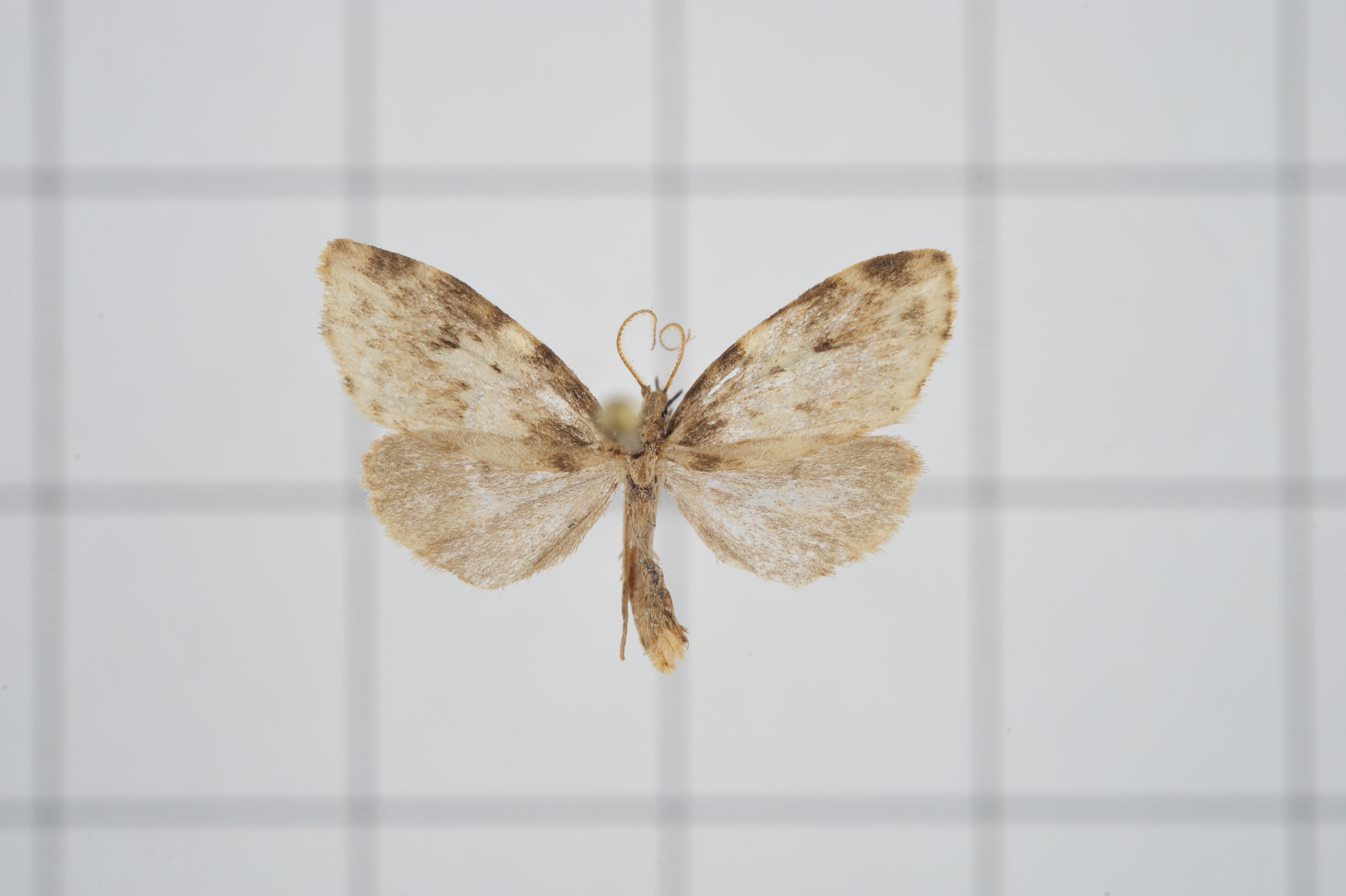

Scientific classification
- Domain: Eukaryota
- Kingdom: Animalia
- Phylum: Arthropoda
- Class: Insecta
- Order: Lepidoptera
- Superfamily: Noctuoidea
- Family: Erebidae
- Subfamily: Arctiinae
- Genus: Parasiccia
- Species: P. dentata

Binomial name
- Parasiccia dentata (Wileman, 1911)

Synonyms
- Hyposiccia dentata Wileman, 1911

= Parasiccia dentata =

Species of moth

Parasiccia dentata is a moth of the subfamily Arctiinae. It was described by Wileman in 1911. It is found in Taiwan.
