= Macrothyatira danieli =

Scientific classification
- Domain: Eukaryota
- Kingdom: Animalia
- Phylum: Arthropoda
- Class: Insecta
- Order: Lepidoptera
- Family: Drepanidae
- Genus: Macrothyatira
- Species: M. danieli

Binomial name
- Macrothyatira danieli Werny, 1966

Synonyms
- Macrothyatira subaureata danieli Werny, 1966

Species of false owlet moth

Macrothyatira danieli is a moth in the family Drepanidae first described by Werny in 1966. It is found in Nepal.
