= Aemene pseudonigra =

Scientific classification
- Kingdom: Animalia
- Phylum: Arthropoda
- Clade: Pancrustacea
- Class: Insecta
- Order: Lepidoptera
- Superfamily: Noctuoidea
- Family: Erebidae
- Subfamily: Arctiinae
- Genus: Aemene
- Species: A. pseudonigra

Binomial name
- Aemene pseudonigra Holloway, 2001

Species of moth

Aemene pseudonigra is a moth of the family Erebidae. It was described by Jeremy Daniel Holloway in 2001. It is found on Borneo. The habitat consists of upper montane forests.

The length of the forewings is 9 mm for males and 8–9 mm for females.
