= Parasiccia perirrorata =

Scientific classification
- Kingdom: Animalia
- Phylum: Arthropoda
- Class: Insecta
- Order: Lepidoptera
- Superfamily: Noctuoidea
- Family: Erebidae
- Subfamily: Arctiinae
- Genus: Parasiccia
- Species: P. perirrorata

Binomial name
- Parasiccia perirrorata Hampson, 1903

Species of moth

Parasiccia perirrorata is a moth of the subfamily Arctiinae. It was described by George Hampson in 1903. It is found in China.
