= Acrapex hamulifera =

Scientific classification
- Kingdom: Animalia
- Phylum: Arthropoda
- Class: Insecta
- Order: Lepidoptera
- Superfamily: Noctuoidea
- Family: Noctuidae
- Genus: Acrapex
- Species: A. hamulifera

Binomial name
- Acrapex hamulifera (Hampson, 1893)

Synonyms
- Meliana hamulifera Hampson, 1893

Species of moth

Acrapex hamulifera is a moth of the family Noctuidae first described by George Hampson in 1893. It is endemic to Sri Lanka.

== Description ==
Its wingspan is about 34 mm. Antennae of male serrated. Male brownish grey. The head and collar have an ochreous tinge. Forewings slightly suffused with ochreous and more so with black. A white hook shape can be seen on the median nervure. There is a pale oblique apical streak, a series of black specks on outer margin. Hindwings are pale fuscous. Ventral side is with cell-spot and postmedial curved line.
