= Acrapex spoliata =

Scientific classification
- Kingdom: Animalia
- Phylum: Arthropoda
- Class: Insecta
- Order: Lepidoptera
- Superfamily: Noctuoidea
- Family: Noctuidae
- Genus: Acrapex
- Species: A. spoliata

Binomial name
- Acrapex spoliata (Walker, 1863)

Synonyms
- Nephopteryx spoliata Walker, 1863

Species of moth

Acrapex spoliata is a species of moth of the family Noctuidae first described by Francis Walker in 1863. It is found in Africa, including Sierra Leone and South Africa.

== Description ==
Head and thorax ochreous tinged with rufous and mixed with some dark brown: palpi with the 2nd joint brown at sides; abdomen dorsally dark brown, ventrally ochreous tinged with rufous. Forewing ochreous tinged with rufous, the costal area suffused with dark brown leaving slight pale streaks on the veins; the median nervure and base of veins arising from it streaked with black-brown; a black-brown streak in and beyond lower angle of cell with white points on it before and beyond the angle; a diffused oblique black-brown shade from termen below apex to vein 3; a terminal series of slight black lunules: cilia dark brown mixed with ochreous. Hindwing red brown; cilia whitish at tips; the underside grey suffused with fuscous, traces of a dark discoidal spot and diffused curved postmedial line.
