= Acrapex atriceps =

Scientific classification
- Kingdom: Animalia
- Phylum: Arthropoda
- Class: Insecta
- Order: Lepidoptera
- Superfamily: Noctuoidea
- Family: Noctuidae
- Genus: Acrapex
- Species: A. atriceps

Binomial name
- Acrapex atriceps Hampson, 1910

Species of moth

Acrapex atriceps is a species of moth of the family Noctuidae first described by George Hampson in 1910. It is found in India.

The wingspan is about 26 mm.

== Description ==
Head and tegulae black; thorax ochreous tinged with rufous, with a black dorsal stripe; pectus and legs dark brown, the hind tibiae and tarsi ochreous above; abdomen ochreous. Forewing pale ochreous slightly tinged with rufous, the veins defined by brown streaks except on inner area beyond the oblique subapical fascia, the costal edge black brown; a diffused brown mark at lower angle of cell with white points in and beyond the angle defined by some black scales; an oblique brown fascia from termen below apex to vein 3 where it is diffused inwards to lower angle of cell; a terminal series of black striae; cilia with black line at middle and mixed with black at tips. Hindwing ochreous white slightly tinged with red brown; cilia ochreous white with a faint brown line at middle; the underside whitish slightly irrorated (sprinkled) with brown, the costal area suffused with brown.
