= Herochroma curvata =

Scientific classification
- Kingdom: Animalia
- Phylum: Arthropoda
- Clade: Pancrustacea
- Class: Insecta
- Order: Lepidoptera
- Family: Geometridae
- Genus: Herochroma
- Species: H. curvata

Binomial name
- Herochroma curvata H.X. Han & D.Y. Xue, 2003

Species of moth

Herochroma curvata is a species of moth of the family Geometridae. It was first described by Han Hongxiang and Xue Dayong in 2003. It is known from Hainan and Guangxi, South China.

The length of the forewings is 19–20 mm for males.
