= Aemene micromesozona =

Scientific classification
- Kingdom: Animalia
- Phylum: Arthropoda
- Clade: Pancrustacea
- Class: Insecta
- Order: Lepidoptera
- Superfamily: Noctuoidea
- Family: Erebidae
- Subfamily: Arctiinae
- Genus: Aemene
- Species: A. micromesozona

Binomial name
- Aemene micromesozona Holloway, 2001

Species of moth

Aemene micromesozona is a moth of the family Erebidae. It was described by Jeremy Daniel Holloway in 2001. It is found on Borneo. The habitat consists of upper montane forests.

The length of the forewings is 7 mm.
