= Acrapex =

- Acrapex roseotincta

Scientific classification
- Kingdom: Animalia
- Phylum: Arthropoda
- Class: Insecta
- Order: Lepidoptera
- Superfamily: Noctuoidea
- Family: Noctuidae
- Subfamily: Xyleninae
- Genus: Acrapex; Hampson, 1894

Genus of moths

Acrapex is a genus of moths of the family Noctuidae. It was described by George Hampson in 1894.

== Description ==
Species are more slenderly built. In the forewings, the apices are more pronounced. Vein 7 originates just beyond the end of areole. The hindwings have an excurved outer margin at veins 2 to 4. Veins 6 and 7 as well as 3 and 4 are stalked. Vein 5 bent at its origin.

== Species ==
- Acrapex abbayei Laporte, 1984
- Acrapex acuminata (Hampson, 1894)
- Acrapex aenigma (Felder & Rogenhofer, 1874)
- Acrapex albicostata (Lower, 1905)
- Acrapex albicostata Hampson, 1916
- Acrapex albivena Hampson, 1910
- Acrapex apexangula Laporte, 1984
- Acrapex apicestriata (Bethune-Baker, 1911)
- Acrapex atriceps Hampson, 1910
- Acrapex ausseili Laporte, 1984
- Acrapex azumai Sugi, 1970
- Acrapex biroseata Berio, 1976
- Acrapex boulardi Laporte, 1984
- Acrapex breviptera Janse, 1939
- Acrapex brunnea Hampson, 1910
- Acrapex brunneolimbata Berio, 1947
- Acrapex bryae Laporte, 1984
- Acrapex carnea Hampson, 1905
- Acrapex concolorana Berio, 1973
- Acrapex congitae Laporte, 1984
- Acrapex cuprescens Hampson, 1914
- Acrapex curvata Hampson, 1902
- Acrapex dallolmoi Berio, 1973
- Acrapex exanimis (Meyrick, 1899)
- Acrapex exsanguis Lower, 1902
- Acrapex fayei Laporte, 1984
- Acrapex ferenigra Berio, 1973
- Acrapex festiva Janse, 1939
- Acrapex fletcheri Laporte, 1984
- Acrapex franeyae Laporte, 1984
- Acrapex fuscifasciata Janse, 1939
- Acrapex genrei Laporte, 1984
- Acrapex gibbosa Berio, 1973
- Acrapex girardi Laporte, 1984
- Acrapex guiffrayorum Laporte, 1984
- Acrapex hamulifera (Hampson, 1893)
- Acrapex hemiphlebia (Hampson, 1914)
- Acrapex holoscota (Hampson, 1914)
- Acrapex ignota Berio, 1973
- Acrapex lepta Krüger, 2005
- Acrapex leptepilepta Krüger, 2005
- Acrapex leucophlebia Hampson, 1894
- Acrapex malagasy Viette, 1967
- Acrapex mastawatae Laporte, 1984
- Acrapex matilei Laporte, 1984
- Acrapex melianoides Warren, 1911
- Acrapex metaphaea Hampson, 1910
- Acrapex minima Janse, 1939
- Acrapex mischus D. S. Fletcher, 1959
- Acrapex mutans Berio, 1973
- Acrapex mystica Janse, 1939
- Acrapex obsoleta Berio, 1973
- Acrapex ottusa Berio, 1973
- Acrapex pacifica Holloway, 1979
- Acrapex parvaclara Berio, 1973
- Acrapex peracuta Berio, 1955
- Acrapex permystica Berio, 1974
- Acrapex pertusa Berio, 1973
- Acrapex postrosea Hulstaert, 1924
- Acrapex prisca (Walker, 1866)
- Acrapex punctosa Berio, 1973
- Acrapex quadrata Berio, 1973
- Acrapex relicta Ferguson, 1991
- Acrapex rhabdoneura Hampson, 1910
- Acrapex roseola Hampson, 1918
- Acrapex roseonigra Berio, 1976
- Acrapex roseotincta Hampson, 1910
- Acrapex satanas Laporte, 1984
- Acrapex seydeli Berio, 1973
- Acrapex simbaensis Le Cerf, 1922
- Acrapex similimystica Berio, 1976
- Acrapex simplex Janse, 1939
- Acrapex sogai Viette, 1967
- Acrapex sparsipuncta Laporte, 1984
- Acrapex spoliata (Walker, 1863)
- Acrapex stictisema Hampson, 1914
- Acrapex stygiata (Hampson, 1910)
- Acrapex subalbissima Berio, 1973
- Acrapex syscia D. S. Fletcher, 1961
- Acrapex sysciodes Berio, 1973
- Acrapex totalba Berio, 1973
- Acrapex tristrigata Warren, 1914
- Acrapex uncina Berio, 1973
- Acrapex uncinoides Berio, 1973
- Acrapex undulata Berio, 1955
- Acrapex unicolora (Hampson, 1910)
