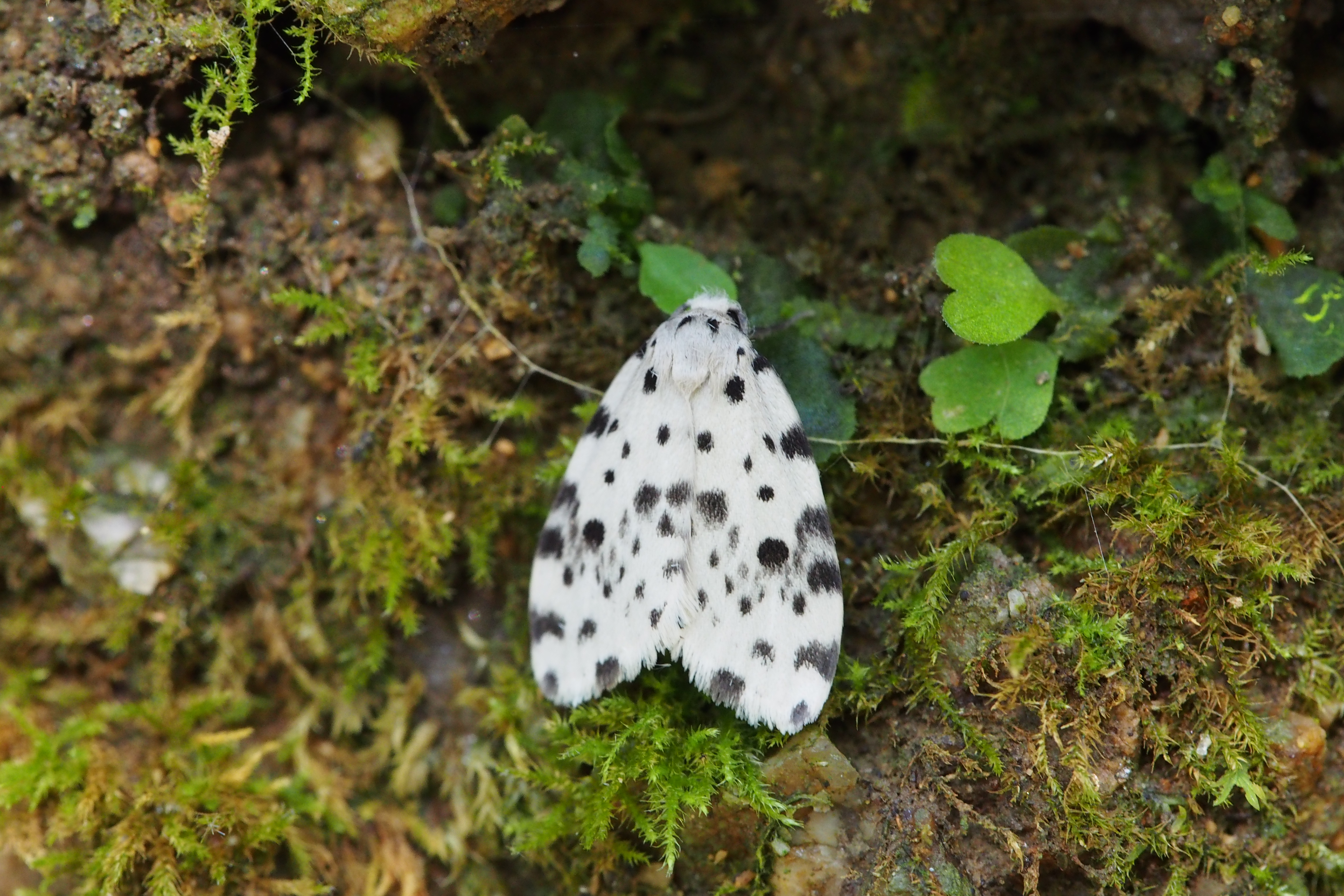
- Aemene altaica

Scientific classification
- Domain: Eukaryota
- Kingdom: Animalia
- Phylum: Arthropoda
- Class: Insecta
- Order: Lepidoptera
- Superfamily: Noctuoidea
- Family: Erebidae
- Subfamily: Arctiinae
- Subtribe: Cisthenina
- Genus: Aemene; Walker, 1854

Synonyms
- Panassa Walker, 1865; Autoceras Felder, 1874; Hyposiccia Hampson, 1900

= Aemene =

Genus of moths

Aemene is a genus of moths in the family Erebidae first described by Francis Walker in 1854. They are found in Japan, throughout India, Myanmar and Sri Lanka.

== Description ==
Palpi porrect (extending forward), reaching beyond the frons. Antennae serrate in male and ciliated in female. Forewings short. Vein 3 from before angle of cell. Vein 4 and 5 from close to angle. Vein 6 from below upper angle. Veins 7 to 9 stalked. Hindwings with veins 4 and 5 from close to the angle and vein 3 absent. Vein 6 and 7 stalked and vein 8 from middle of cell.

== Species ==
- Aemene altaica (Lederer, 1855)
- Aemene amnaea Swinhoe, 1894
- Aemene clarimaculata Holloway, 2001
- Aemene fumosa Černý, 2009
- Aemene hortensis Černý, 2009
- Aemene maculata (Poujade, 1886)
- Aemene maculifascia Moore, 1878
- Aemene marginipuncta (Talbot, 1926)
- Aemene mesozonata Hampson, 1898
- Aemene micromesozona Holloway, 2001
- Aemene monastyrskii Dubatolov & Bucsek, 2013
- Aemene pseudonigra Holloway, 2001
- Aemene punctatissima Poujade, 1886
- Aemene punctigera Leech, 1899
- Aemene taprobanis Walker, 1854
- Aemene taeniata Fixsen, 1887
