= Parasiccia nebulosa =

Scientific classification
- Domain: Eukaryota
- Kingdom: Animalia
- Phylum: Arthropoda
- Class: Insecta
- Order: Lepidoptera
- Superfamily: Noctuoidea
- Family: Erebidae
- Subfamily: Arctiinae
- Genus: Parasiccia
- Species: P. nebulosa

Binomial name
- Parasiccia nebulosa Wileman, 1914

Species of moth

Parasiccia nebulosa is a moth of the subfamily Arctiinae. It was described by Wileman in 1914. It is found in Taiwan.
