= Herochroma baba =

Scientific classification
- Kingdom: Animalia
- Phylum: Arthropoda
- Class: Insecta
- Order: Lepidoptera
- Family: Geometridae
- Genus: Herochroma
- Species: H. baba

Binomial name
- Herochroma baba C. Swinhoe, 1893

Synonyms
- Pseudoterpna baba Meyrick, 1895; Actenochroma baba C. Swinhoe, 1900

Species of moth

Herochroma baba is a species of moth of the family Geometridae first described by Charles Swinhoe in 1893. It is found in China (Hubei, Hunan, Guangdong, Guangxi), north-eastern India, Nepal, northern Vietnam and Peninsular Malaysia.
