= Herochroma xuthopletes =

Scientific classification
- Kingdom: Animalia
- Phylum: Arthropoda
- Clade: Pancrustacea
- Class: Insecta
- Order: Lepidoptera
- Family: Geometridae
- Genus: Herochroma
- Species: H. xuthopletes

Binomial name
- Herochroma xuthopletes (L. B. Prout, 1934)

Synonyms
- Archaeobablis cristata xuthopletes Prout, 1932

Species of moth

Herochroma xuthopletes is a moth of the family Geometridae first described by Louis Beethoven Prout in 1934. It is found on Sumatra and Borneo. The habitat consists of lowland alluvial forests.
