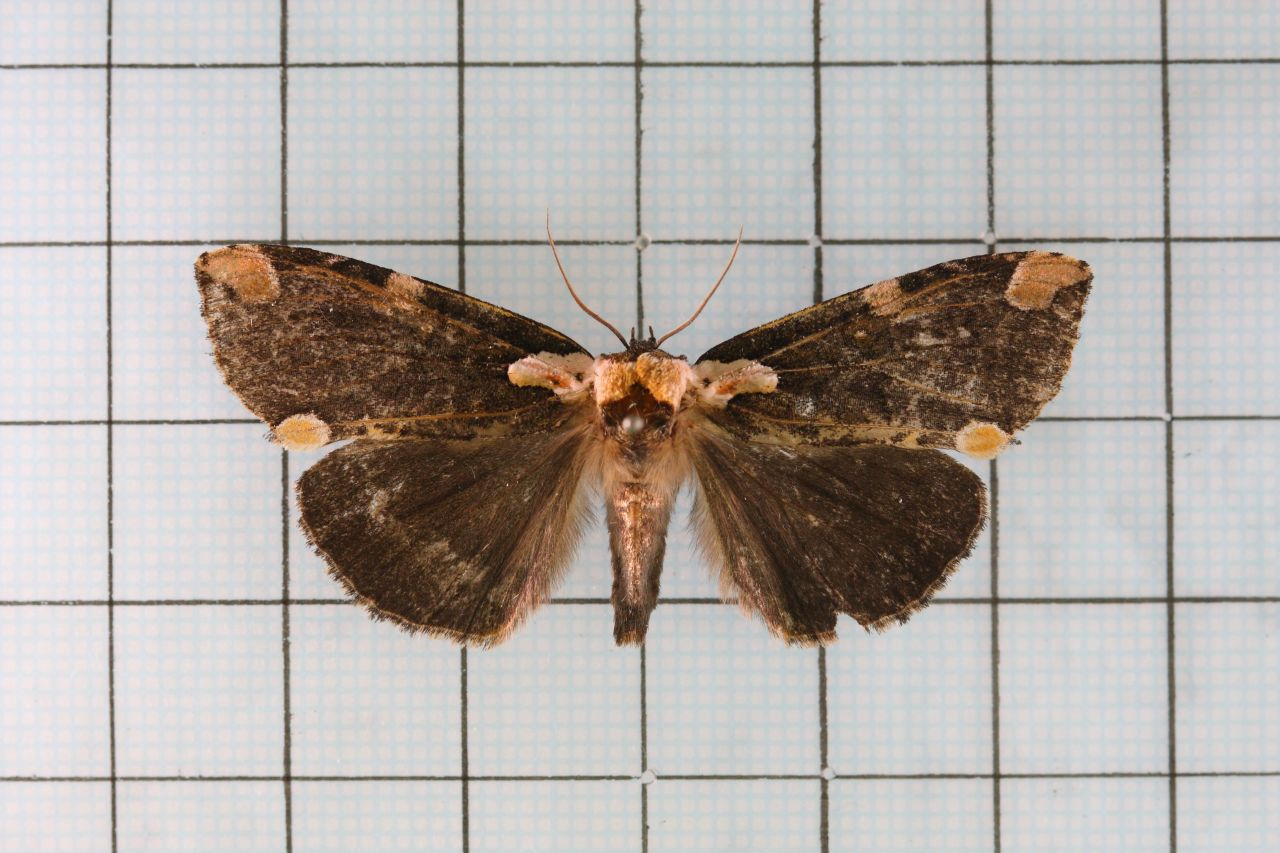
- Macrothyatira flavida

Scientific classification
- Domain: Eukaryota
- Kingdom: Animalia
- Phylum: Arthropoda
- Class: Insecta
- Order: Lepidoptera
- Family: Drepanidae
- Subfamily: Thyatirinae
- Genus: Macrothyatira; Marumo, 1916

Synonyms
- Exothyatira Matsumura 1933; Haplothyatira Houlbert, 1921; Melanocraspes Houlbert, 1921

= Macrothyatira =

Moth genus in family Drepanidae

Macrothyatira is a genus of moths belonging to the subfamily Thyatirinae of the Drepanidae.

== Selected species ==
- Macrothyatira arizana (Wileman, 1910)
  - Macrothyatira arizana diminuta (Houlbert, 1921)
- Macrothyatira conspicua (Leech, 1900)
- Macrothyatira danieli Werny, 1966
- Macrothyatira fasciata (Houlbert, 1921)
- Macrothyatira flavida (Butler, 1885)
- Macrothyatira flavimargo (Leech, 1900)
- Macrothyatira labiata (Gaede, 1930)
- Macrothyatira oblonga (Poujade, 1887)
- Macrothyatira stramineata (Warren, 1912)
- Macrothyatira subaureata (Sick, 1941)
- Macrothyatira transitans (Houlbert, 1921)
