= Acrapex brunnea =

Scientific classification
- Kingdom: Animalia
- Phylum: Arthropoda
- Class: Insecta
- Order: Lepidoptera
- Superfamily: Noctuoidea
- Family: Noctuidae
- Genus: Acrapex
- Species: A. brunnea

Binomial name
- Acrapex brunnea Hampson, 1910

Synonyms
- Acrapex ochracea Bethune-Baker, 1911; Acrapex brunneosa Bethune-Baker,1911

Species of moth

Acrapex brunnea is a species of moth of the family Noctuidae first described by George Hampson in 1910. It is found in Africa, including Angola, Kenya and South Africa.

The wingspan is 20–30 mm.

== Description ==
Head and thorax dark brown slightly mixed with ochreous; thorax ochreous tinged with rufous; pectus and legs ochreous mixed with brown; abdomen ochreous suffused with brown. Forewing ochreous, the costal area suffused with red brown leaving slight pale streaks on the veins; a diffused brown streak along median nervure and thence to the subterminal oblique fascia, with two white points on it at lower angle of cell; a slight brown streak below base of cell; an oblique pale fascia from apex to discal fold with a diffused dark brown fascia below it from termen below apex to vein 3 with minute black streaks on it in the interspaces; a terminal series of slight black lunules; cilia ochreous mixed with brown and with brown line near base. Hindwing ochreous white, the veins and terminal area tinged with brown; a fine brown terminal line; cilia with a whitish with a slight brown line near base; the underside whitish with the costal and terminal areas sprinkled with reddish brown.
