= Herochroma hemiticheres =

Scientific classification
- Kingdom: Animalia
- Phylum: Arthropoda
- Clade: Pancrustacea
- Class: Insecta
- Order: Lepidoptera
- Family: Geometridae
- Genus: Herochroma
- Species: H. hemiticheres

Binomial name
- Herochroma hemiticheres (L. B. Prout, 1935)

Synonyms
- Neobalbis hemiticheres Prout, 1935; Archaeobalbis thaiensis Inoue, 1992; Herochroma thaiensis

Species of moth

Herochroma hemiticheres is a moth of the family Geometridae first described by Louis Beethoven Prout in 1935. It is found on Java and in Thailand.
