= Macrothyatira flavimargo =

Scientific classification
- Domain: Eukaryota
- Kingdom: Animalia
- Phylum: Arthropoda
- Class: Insecta
- Order: Lepidoptera
- Family: Drepanidae
- Genus: Macrothyatira
- Species: M. flavimargo

Binomial name
- Macrothyatira flavimargo (Leech, 1900)

Synonyms
- Thyatira flavimargo Leech, 1900

Species of false owlet moth

Macrothyatira flavimargo is a moth in the family Drepanidae. It is found in western China (Gansu, Sichuan, Yunnan).

The forewings are fuscous brown, traversed by several darker and paler wavy lines. There is a purplish-brown spot at the base of the wing, this colour also extends over the thorax. The reniform stigma is outlined with blackish and there is a round pinkish-white spot above it, and a larger curved spot towards the apex, outwardly edged with black. On the middle of the inner margin is a narrow erect whitish spot, and towards the anal angle a round ochreous one edged with whitish. The fringe is brown beyond a sinuous black terminal line. The hindwings are fuliginous.
