= Acrapex mischus =

Scientific classification
- Domain: Eukaryota
- Kingdom: Animalia
- Phylum: Arthropoda
- Class: Insecta
- Order: Lepidoptera
- Superfamily: Noctuoidea
- Family: Noctuidae
- Genus: Acrapex
- Species: A. mischus

Binomial name
- Acrapex mischus D. S. Fletcher, 1959

Species of moth

Acrapex mischus is a moth of the family Noctuidae. It was described by David Stephen Fletcher in 1959. It is endemic to the Hawaiian island of Oahu.

The wingspan is 28.5 mm for males and 30–33 mm for females.
