= Herochroma perspicillata =

Scientific classification
- Kingdom: Animalia
- Phylum: Arthropoda
- Clade: Pancrustacea
- Class: Insecta
- Order: Lepidoptera
- Family: Geometridae
- Genus: Herochroma
- Species: H. perspicillata

Binomial name
- Herochroma perspicillata H.X. Han & D.Y. Xue, 2003

Species of moth

Herochroma perspicillata is a species of moth of the family Geometridae. It was first described by Han Hongxiang and Xue Dayong in 2003. It is found in Yunnan, China.

Based on the holotype, the length of the forewings is 25.5 mm for males.
