= Acrapex exanimis =

Scientific classification
- Kingdom: Animalia
- Phylum: Arthropoda
- Class: Insecta
- Order: Lepidoptera
- Superfamily: Noctuoidea
- Family: Noctuidae
- Genus: Acrapex
- Species: A. exanimis

Binomial name
- Acrapex exanimis (Meyrick, 1899)

Synonyms
- Caradrina exanimis Meyrick, 1899

Species of moth

Acrapex exanimis is a moth of the family Noctuidae. It was first described by Edward Meyrick in 1899. It is endemic to the Hawaiian islands of Oahu and Hawaii.

The wingspan is about 25 mm.

The larvae feed on Pannicum kaalense and Panicum torridum. They bore the stems of their host plant.
