= Macrothyatira subaureata =

Scientific classification
- Domain: Eukaryota
- Kingdom: Animalia
- Phylum: Arthropoda
- Class: Insecta
- Order: Lepidoptera
- Family: Drepanidae
- Genus: Macrothyatira
- Species: M. subaureata

Binomial name
- Macrothyatira subaureata (Sick, 1941)

Synonyms
- Melanocraspes subaureata Sick, 1941

Species of false owlet moth

Macrothyatira subaureata is a moth in the family Drepanidae. It is found in Yunnan, China.
