= Macrothyatira stramineata =

Scientific classification
- Domain: Eukaryota
- Kingdom: Animalia
- Phylum: Arthropoda
- Class: Insecta
- Order: Lepidoptera
- Family: Drepanidae
- Genus: Macrothyatira
- Species: M. stramineata

Binomial name
- Macrothyatira stramineata (Warren, 1912)

Synonyms
- Thyatira stramineata Warren, 1912; Thyatira likiangensis Sick, 1941

Species of false owlet moth

Macrothyatira stramineata is a moth in the family Drepanidae. It is found in Vietnam, Thailand, Assam in India and Yunnan and Hunan in China.

The forewings are olive grey with blackish wavy lines. There is an oblong whitish basal patch, running bluntly outwards above vein 1 across the base of the cell. There is also a large rounded white patch at the apex and a smaller one at the middle of the costa and a flattened one at the anal angle. The inner line is outcurved at the middle and the outer line is double, followed on the costa by two short white strigae. The stigmata is pale, with dark outlines and the orbicular is dotlike. The reniform is oblong and vertical. The subterminal line is lunulate dentate, the teeth white tipped basewards. The terminal black lunules are filled in with paler. The hindwings are straw yellow, with a broad blackish terminal border in the apical half, becoming narrower and subterminal below. The fringe and extreme termen are straw colour.

== Subspecies ==
- Macrothyatira stramineata stramineata (Thailand, India: Assam)
- Macrothyatira stramineata likiangensis (Sick, 1941) (Vietnam, China: Hunan, Yunnan)
