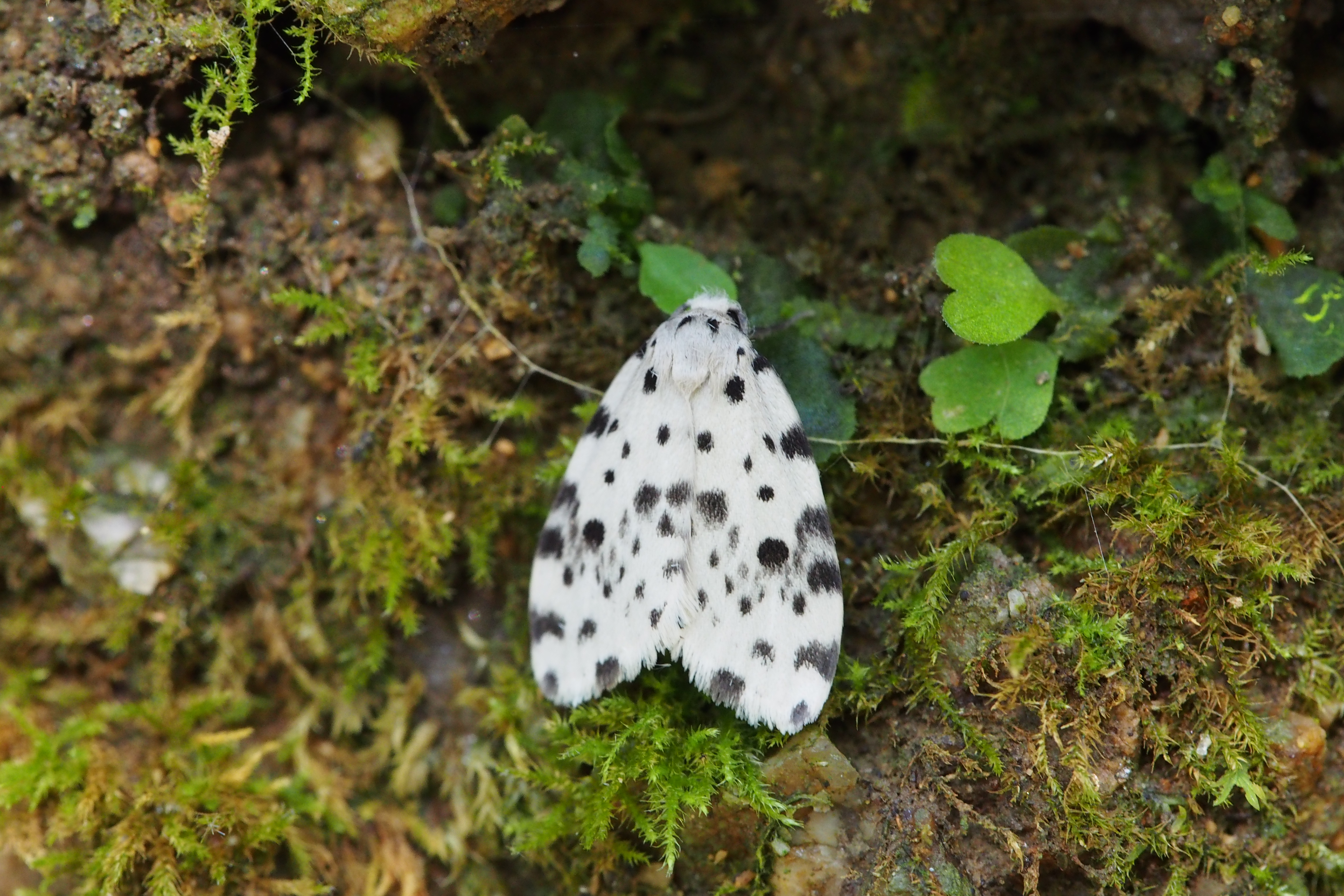

Scientific classification
- Domain: Eukaryota
- Kingdom: Animalia
- Phylum: Arthropoda
- Class: Insecta
- Order: Lepidoptera
- Superfamily: Noctuoidea
- Family: Erebidae
- Subfamily: Arctiinae
- Genus: Aemene
- Species: A. altaica

Binomial name
- Aemene altaica (Lederer, 1855)

Synonyms
- Nudaria altaica Lederer, 1855; Aemene fasciata Butler, 1877; Parasiccia altaica coreana Bryk, [1949]

= Aemene altaica =

Species of moth

Aemene altaica is a moth of the family Erebidae. It was described by Julius Lederer in 1855. It is found in the Russian Far East (northern and western Altai, Middle Amur, Primorye, southern Sakhalin), China (Xinjiang, Heilongjiang), Korea and Japan.
