= Aemene maculifascia =

Scientific classification
- Domain: Eukaryota
- Kingdom: Animalia
- Phylum: Arthropoda
- Class: Insecta
- Order: Lepidoptera
- Superfamily: Noctuoidea
- Family: Erebidae
- Subfamily: Arctiinae
- Genus: Aemene
- Species: A. maculifascia

Binomial name
- Aemene maculifascia Moore, 1878

Synonyms
- Hyposiccia abraxina Rothschild, 1913; Parasiccia maculifascia mokanshanensis Reich, 1957

Species of moth

Aemene maculifascia is a moth of the family Erebidae. It was described by Frederic Moore in 1878. It is found in China and Sikkim, India.
