= Acrapex carnea =

Scientific classification
- Kingdom: Animalia
- Phylum: Arthropoda
- Class: Insecta
- Order: Lepidoptera
- Superfamily: Noctuoidea
- Family: Noctuidae
- Genus: Acrapex
- Species: A. carnea

Binomial name
- Acrapex carnea Hampson, 1905

Species of moth

Acrapex carnea is a species of moth of the family Noctuidae first described by George Hampson in 1905. It is found in Africa, including South Africa.

The wingspan is 28–30 mm.

== Description ==
Head and thorax brown slightly mixed with ochreous; thorax ochreous tinged with rufous; pectus, legs, and abdomen ochreous suffused with brown. Forewing ochreous tinged with rufous; a brown streak on median nervure except at base; slight black streaks in and beyond lower angle of cell and a point at upper angle; a whitish fascia in terminal half of cell and thence obliquely curved to apex; traces of an oblique postmedial series of dark points on veins 4 to 1; a brown shade from termen below apex with very slight dark streaks on its inner edge above and below vein 5; traces of a terminal series of black points; cilia white tinged with brown and with faint brown line at middle. Hindwing whitish suffused with brown, paler at base; cilia white tinged with brown and with faint brown line near base; the underside whitish suffused with fuscous brown.
