= Aemene marginipuncta =

Scientific classification
- Domain: Eukaryota
- Kingdom: Animalia
- Phylum: Arthropoda
- Class: Insecta
- Order: Lepidoptera
- Superfamily: Noctuoidea
- Family: Erebidae
- Subfamily: Arctiinae
- Genus: Aemene
- Species: A. marginipuncta

Binomial name
- Aemene marginipuncta (Talbot, 1926)

Synonyms
- Parasiccia marginipuncta Talbot, 1926

Species of moth

Aemene marginipuncta is a moth of the family Erebidae. It was described by George Talbot in 1926. It is found on Borneo and Peninsular Malaysia.
