= Gustave Arthur Poujade =

French entomologist (1845–1909)

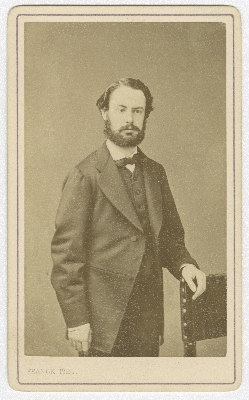
Gustave Arthur Poujade

Gustave Arthur Poujade (1845–1909, Fontainebleau) was a French entomologist and scientific illustrator, interested in Coleoptera and Lepidoptera. He was an honorary preparator in the Muséum national d'histoire naturelle in Paris. The museum holds his collections. He described new species of Lepidoptera in Bulletin du Muséum national d'Histoire naturelle de Paris and Bulletin de la Société entomologique de France. He was especially interested in the butterflies and moths of Tibet. Gustave Poujade was a Member of Société entomologique de France.
