= Le Règne Animal =

Book by Georges Cuvier

Le Règne animal distribué d’après son organisation (The Animal Kingdom, Distributed According to Its Organization)
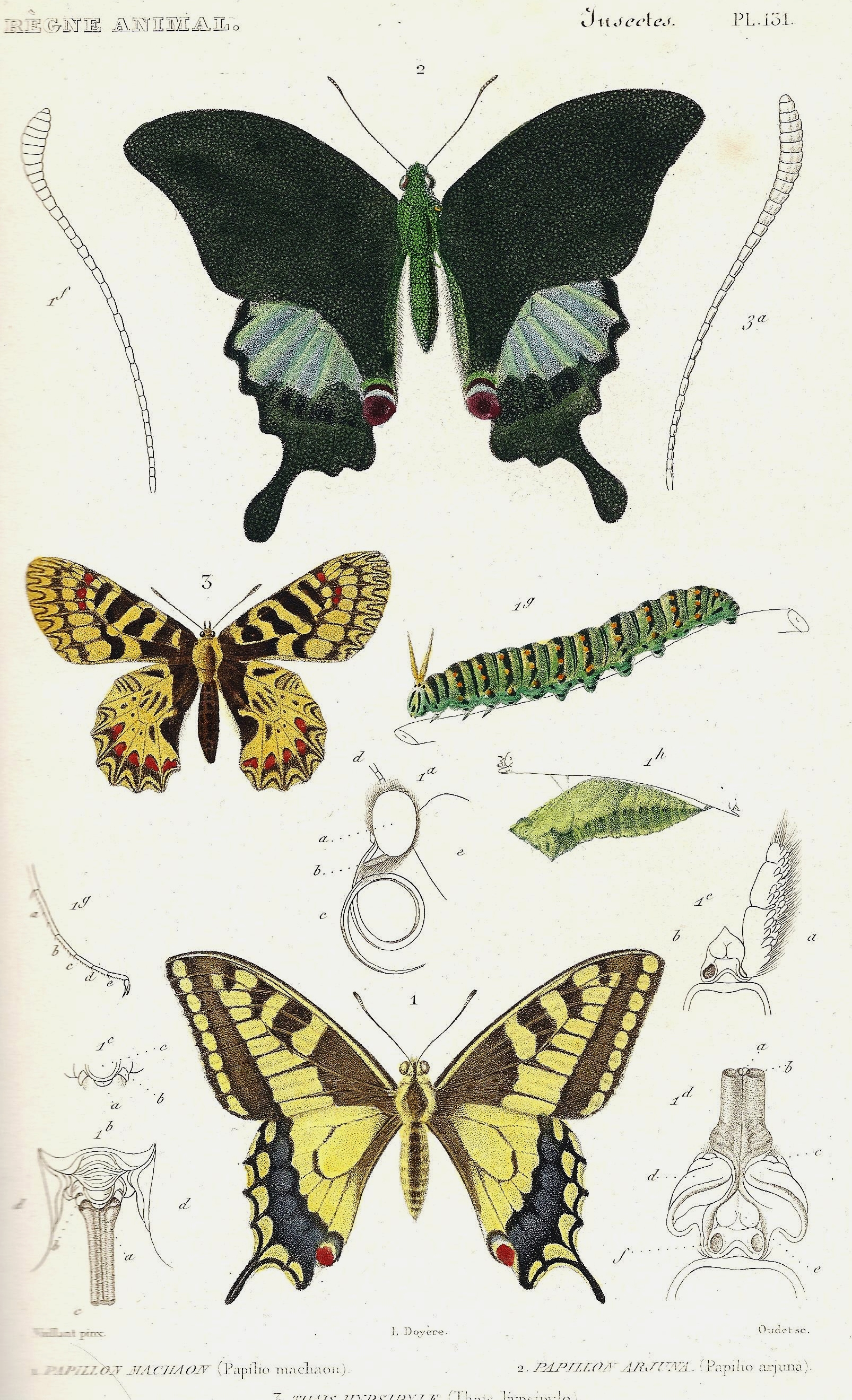
- Butterflies from the 1828 edition
- Author: Georges Cuvier
- Subject: Zoology
- Publication date: 1816 (4 vols); 1829–1830 (5 vols)
- Publication place: France

Le Règne Animal (lit. 'The Animal Kingdom') is the most famous work of the French naturalist Georges Cuvier. It sets out to describe the natural structure of the whole of the animal kingdom based on comparative anatomy, and its natural history. Cuvier divided the animals into four embranchements ("Branches", roughly corresponding to phyla), namely vertebrates, molluscs, articulated animals (arthropods and annelids), and zoophytes (cnidaria and other phyla).

The work appeared in four octavo volumes in December 1816 (although it has "1817" on the title pages); a second edition in five volumes was brought out in 1829–1830 and a third, written by twelve "disciples" of Cuvier, in 1836–1849. In this classic work, Cuvier presented the results of his life's research into the structure of living and fossil animals. With the exception of the section on insects, in which he was assisted by his friend Pierre André Latreille, the whole of the work was his own. It was translated into English many times, often with substantial notes and supplementary material updating the book in accordance with the expansion of knowledge. It was also translated into German, Italian and other languages, and abridged in versions for children.

Le Règne Animal was influential in being widely read, and in presenting accurate descriptions of groups of related animals, such as the living elephants and the extinct mammoths, providing convincing evidence for evolutionary change to readers including Charles Darwin, although Cuvier himself rejected the possibility of evolution.

== Context ==
As a boy, Georges Cuvier (1769-1832) read the Comte de Buffon's Histoire Naturelle from the previous century, as well as Linnaeus and Fabricius. He was brought to Paris by Étienne Geoffroy Saint-Hilaire in 1795, not long after the French Revolution. He soon became a professor of animal anatomy at the Musée National d'Histoire Naturelle, surviving changes of government from revolutionary to Napoleonic to monarchy. Essentially on his own he created the discipline of vertebrate palaeontology and the accompanying comparative method. He demonstrated that animals had become extinct.

In an earlier attempt to improve the classification of animals, Cuvier transferred the concepts of Antoine-Laurent de Jussieu's (1748-1836) method of natural classification, which had been presented in 1789 in Genera plantarum, from botany to zoology. In 1795, from a "fixist" perspective (denying the possibility of evolution), Cuvier divided Linnaeus's two unsatisfactory classes ("insects" and "worms") into six classes of "white-blooded animals" or invertebrates: molluscs, crustaceans, insects and worms (differently understood), echinoderms and zoophytes. Cuvier divided the molluscs into three orders: cephalopods, gastropods and acephala. Still not satisfied, he continued to work on animal classification, culminating over twenty years later in the Règne Animal.

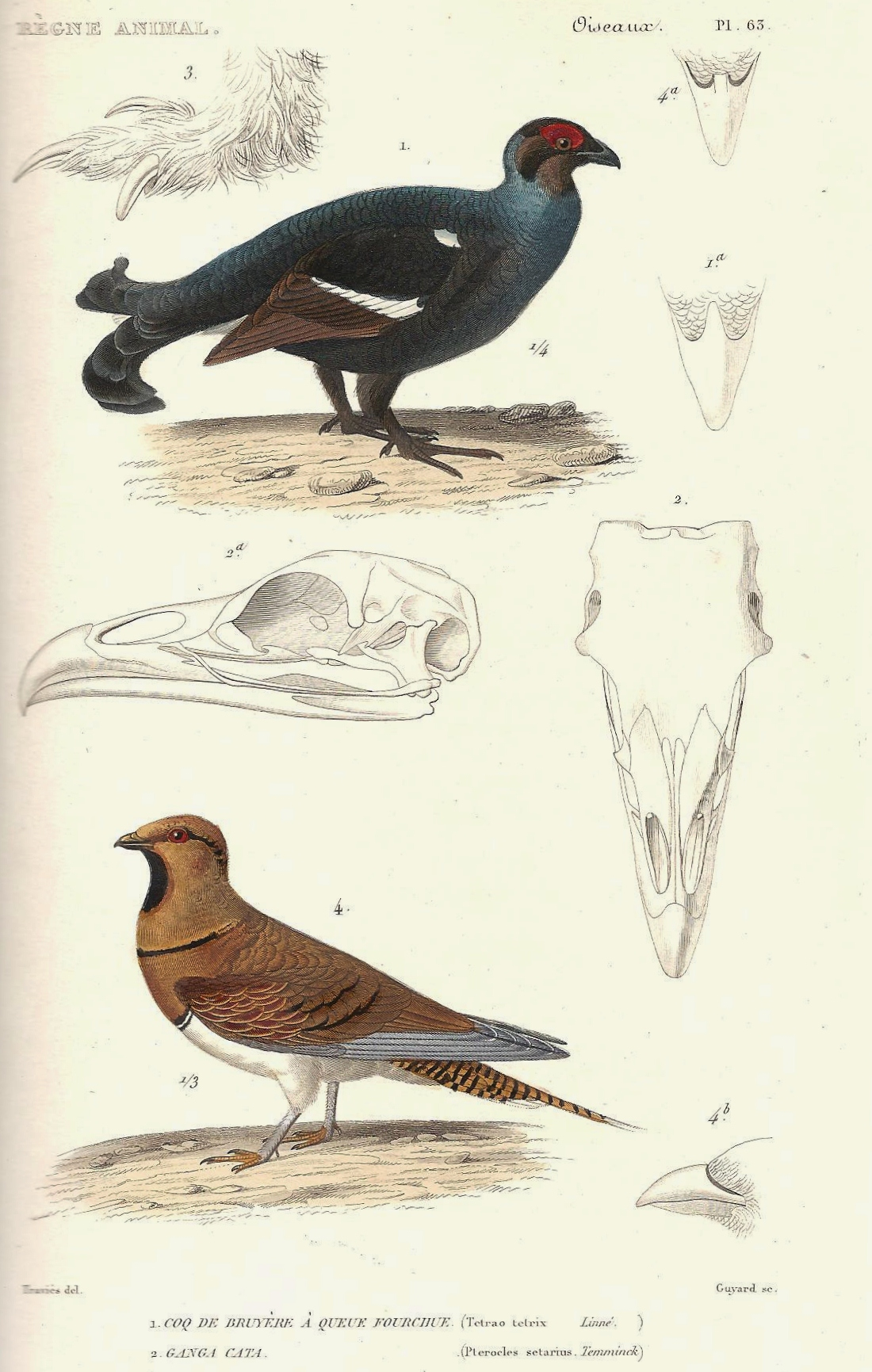
Blackcock and pin-tailed sandgrouse. 1828 edition

For the Règne Animal, using evidence from comparative anatomy and palaeontology—including his own observations—Cuvier divided the animal kingdom into four principal body plans. Taking the central nervous system as an animal's principal organ system which controlled all the other organ systems such as the circulatory and digestive systems, Cuvier distinguished four types of organisation of an animal's body:

- I. with a brain and a spinal cord (surrounded by parts of the skeleton)
- II. with organs linked by nerve fibres
- III. with two longitudinal, ventral nerve cords linked by a band with two ganglia positioned below the oesophagus
- IV. with a diffuse nervous system which is not clearly discernible

Grouping animals with these body plans resulted in four "embranchements" or branches (vertebrates, molluscs, the articulata that he claimed were natural (arguing that insects and annelid worms were related) and zoophytes (radiata)). This effectively broke with the mediaeval notion of the continuity of the living world in the form of the great chain of being. It also set him in opposition to both Saint-Hilaire and Jean-Baptiste Lamarck. Lamarck claimed that species could transform through the influence of the environment, while Saint-Hilaire argued in 1820 that two of Cuvier's branches, the molluscs and radiata, could be united via various features, while the other two, articulata and vertebrates, similarly had parallels with each other. Then in 1830, Saint-Hilaire argued that these two groups could themselves be related, implying a single form of life from which all others could have evolved, and that Cuvier's four body plans were not fundamental.

== Book ==
=== Editions ===
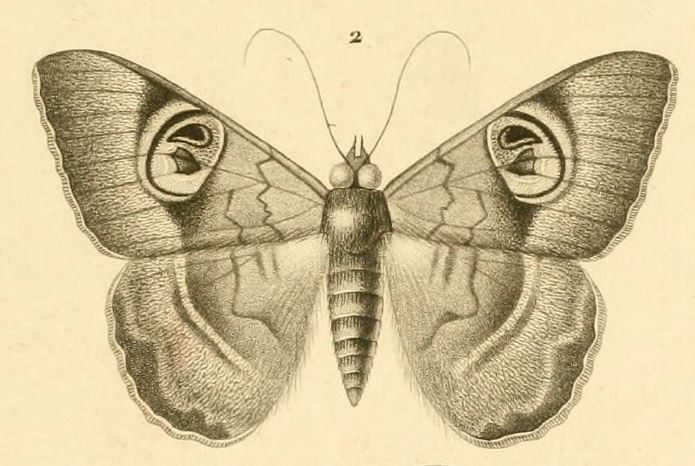
Cyligramma limacina, an illustration from Félix Édouard Guérin-Méneville's Iconographie du Règne Animal de G. Cuvier 1829–1844

- Le Règne Animal distribué d'après son organisation, pour servir de base à l'histoire naturelle des animaux et d'introduction à l'anatomie comparée (1st edition, 4 volumes, 1816) (Note: The date 1817 is printed on the title pages, but the books actually appeared before 2 December 1816.) (Volumes I, II and IV by Cuvier; Volume III by Pierre André Latreille)
- --- (2nd edition, 5 volumes, 1829–1830)
- --- (3rd edition, 22 volumes, 1836–1849) known as the "Disciples edition"

The twelve "disciples" who contributed to the 3rd edition were Jean Victor Audouin (insects), Gerard Paul Deshayes (molluscs), Alcide d'Orbigny (birds), Antoine Louis Dugès (arachnids), Georges Louis Duvernoy (reptiles), Charles Léopold Laurillard (mammals in part), Henri Milne Edwards (crustaceans, annelids, zoophytes, and mammals in part), Francois Desire Roulin (mammals in part), Achille Valenciennes (fishes), Louis Michel François Doyère (insects), Charles Émile Blanchard (insects, zoophytes) and Jean Louis Armand de Quatrefages de Bréau (annelids, arachnids etc.).

The work was illustrated with tables and plates (at the end of Volume IV) covering only some of the species mentioned. A much larger set of illustrations, said by Cuvier to be "as accurate as they were elegant" was published by the entomologist Félix Édouard Guérin-Méneville in his Iconographie du Règne Animal de G. Cuvier, the nine volumes appearing between 1829 and 1844. The 448 quarto plates by Christophe Annedouche, Canu, Eugène Giraud, Lagesse, Lebrun, Vittore Pedretti, Plée and Smith illustrated some 6200 animals.

=== Translations ===
Le Règne Animal was translated into languages including English, German and Italian.

Many English translations and abridged versions were published and reprinted in the nineteenth century; records may be for the entire work or individual volumes, which were not necessarily dated, while old translations were often brought out in "new" editions by other publishers, making for a complex publication history. A translation by Edward Griffith (with assistance by Edward Pidgeon for some volumes and other specialists for other volumes) was published in 44 parts by G.B. Whittaker and partners from 1824 to 1835 and many times reprinted (up to 2012 and eBook format); another by G. Henderson in 1834–1837. A translation was made and published by the ornithologist William MacGillivray in Edinburgh in 1839–1840. Another version by Edward Blyth and others was published by William S. Orr and Co. in 1840. An abridged version by an "experienced teacher" was published by Longman, Brown, Green and Longman in London, and by Stephen Knapp in Coventry, in 1844. Kraus published an edition in New York in 1969. Other editions were brought out by H.G. Bohn in 1851 and W. Orr in 1854. An "easy introduction to the study of the animal kingdom: according to the natural method of Cuvier", together with examination questions on each chapter, was made by Annie Roberts and published in the 1850s by Thomas Varty.

A German translation by H.R. Schinz was published by J.S. Cotta in 1821–1825; another was made by Friedrich Siegmund Voigt and published by Brockhaus.

An Italian translation by G. de Cristofori was published by Stamperia Carmignani in 1832.

A Hungarian translation by Peter Vajda was brought out in 1841.

=== Approach ===
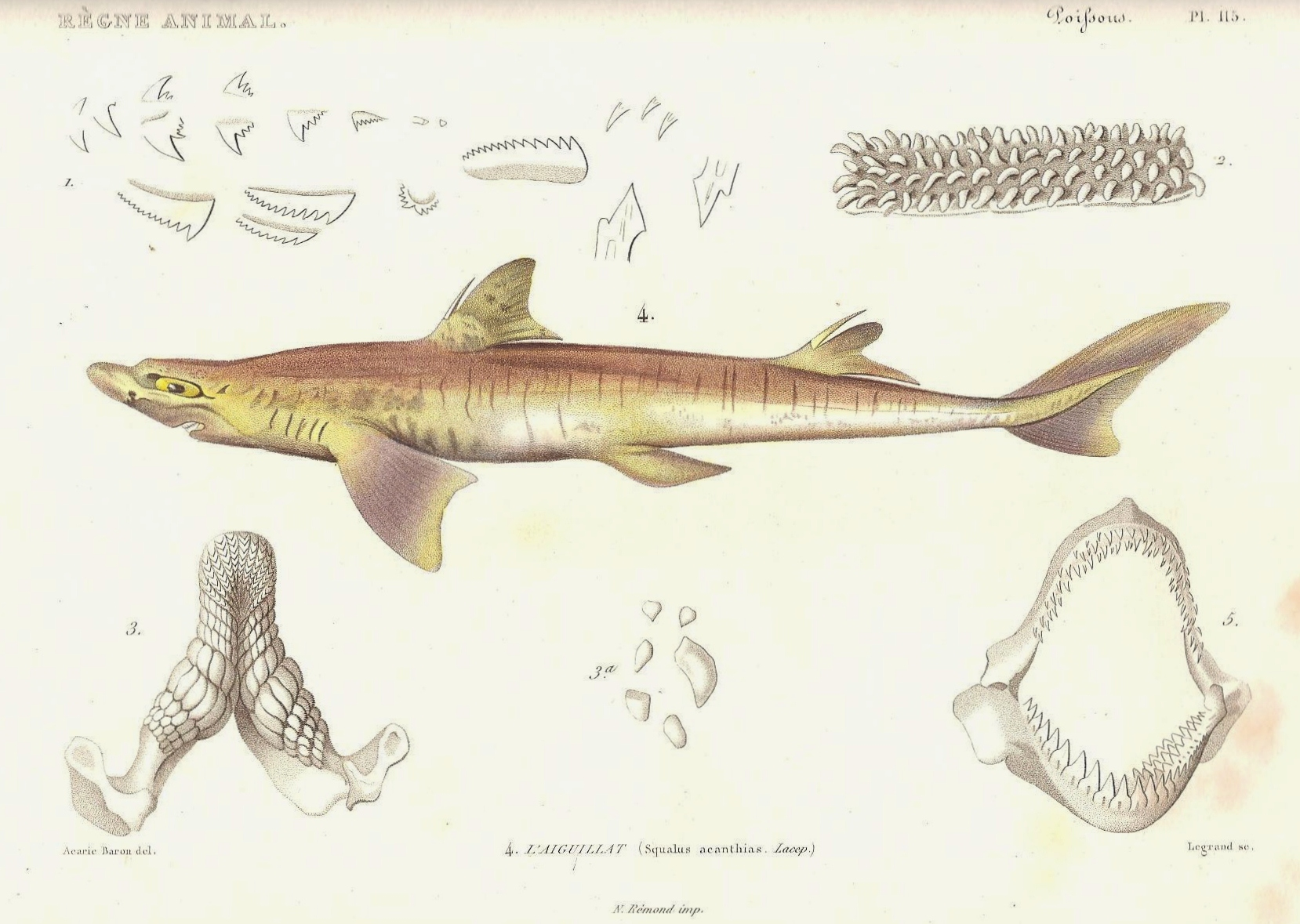
Spiny dogfish. 1828 edition

Each section, such as on reptiles at the start of Volume II (and the entire work) is introduced with an essay on distinguishing aspects of their zoology. In the case of the reptiles, the essay begins with the observation that their circulation is so arranged that only part of the blood pumped by the heart goes through the lungs; Cuvier discusses the implications of this arrangement, next observing that they have a relatively small brain compared to the mammals and birds, and that none of them incubate their eggs.

Next, Cuvier identifies the taxonomic divisions of the group, in this case four orders of reptiles, the chelonians (tortoises and turtles), saurians (lizards), ophidians (snakes) and batracians (amphibians, now considered a separate class of vertebrates), describing each group in a single sentence. Thus the batracians are said to have a heart with a single atrium, a naked body (with no scales), and to pass with age from being fish-like to being like a quadruped or biped.

There is then a section heading, in this case "The first order of Reptiles, or The Chelonians", followed by a three-page essay on their zoology, starting with the fact that their hearts have two atria. The structure then repeats at a lower taxonomic level, with what Cuvier notes is one of Linnaeus's genera, Testudo, the tortoises, with five sub-genera. The first sub-genus comprises the land tortoises; their zoology is summed up in a paragraph, which observes that they have a domed carapace, with a solid bony support (the term being "charpente", commonly used of the structure of wooden beams that support a roof). He records that the legs are thick, with short digits joined for most of their length, five toenails on the forelegs, four on the hind legs.

Then (on the ninth page) he arrives at the first species in the volume, the Greek tortoise, Testudo graeca. It is summed up in a paragraph, Cuvier noting that it is the commonest tortoise in Europe, living in Greece, Italy, Sardinia and (he writes) apparently all round the Mediterranean. He then gives its distinguishing marks, with a highly domed carapace, raised scales boldly marked with black and yellow marbling, and at the posterior edge a bulge over the tail. He gives its size—rarely reaching a foot in length; notes that it lives on leaves, fruit, insects and worms; digs a hole in which to pass the winter; mates in spring, and lays 4 or 5 eggs like those of a pigeon. The species is illustrated with two plates.

=== Contents ===
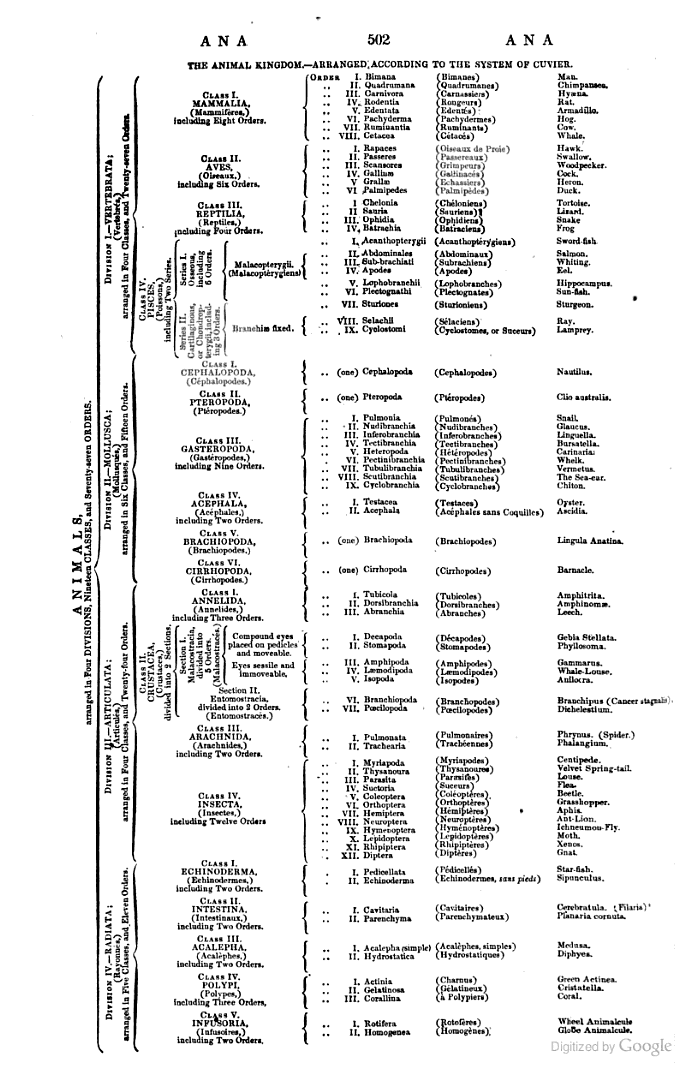
Table of the Animal Kingdom based on Cuvier's Règne Animal in the Penny Cyclopaedia, 1828

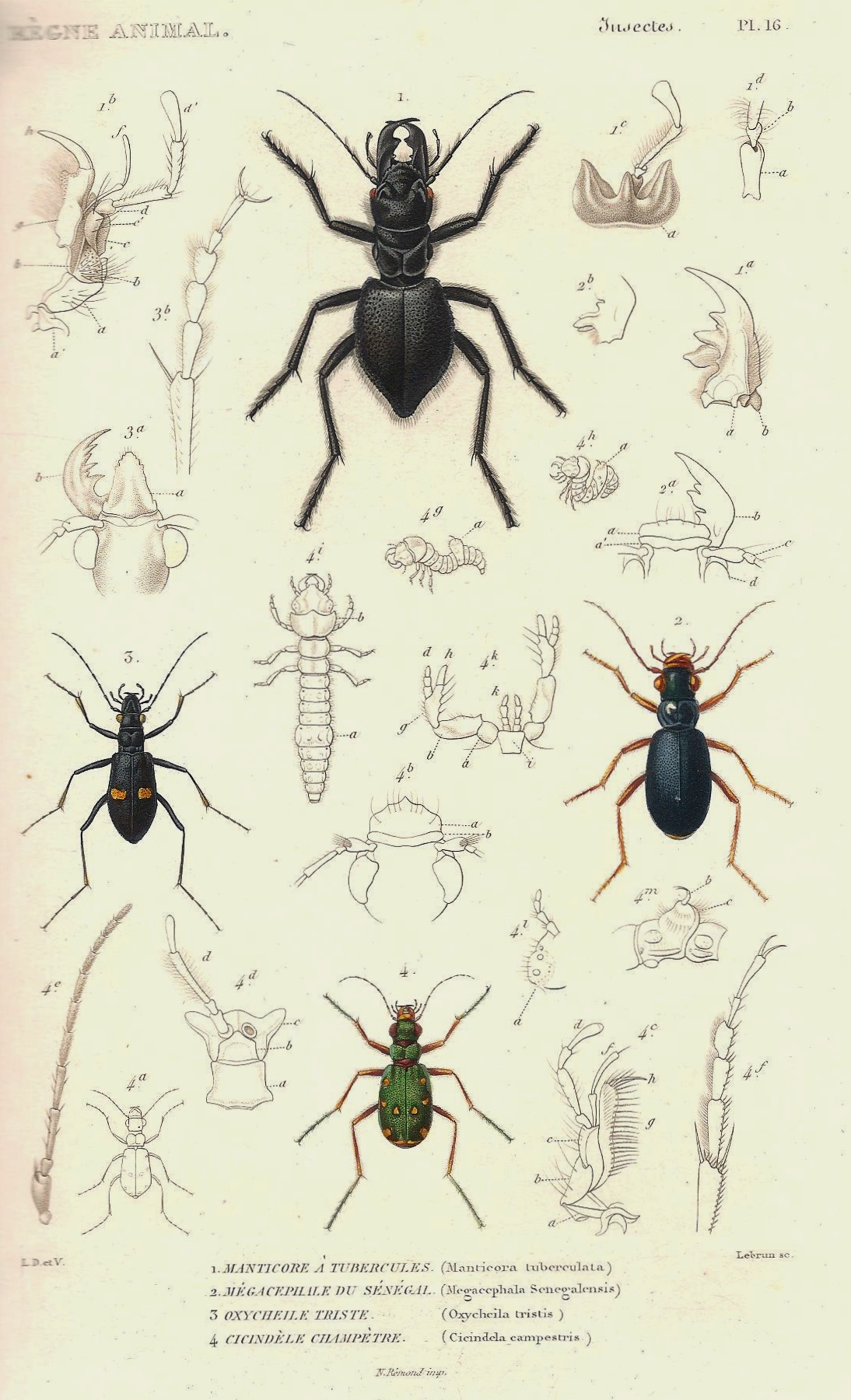
Ground beetles (green tiger beetle at bottom). 1828 edition.

The classification adopted by Cuvier to define the natural structure of the animal kingdom, including both living and fossil forms, was as follows, the list forming the structure of the Règne Animal. Where Cuvier's group names correspond (more or less) to modern taxa, these are named, in English if possible, in parentheses. The table from the 1828 Penny Cyclopaedia indicates species that were thought to belong to each group in Cuvier's taxonomy. The four major divisions were known as embranchements ("branches").

- I. Vertébrés. (Vertebrates)
  - Mammifères (Mammals): 1. Bimanes, 2. Quadrumanes, 3. Carnassiers (Carnivores), 4. Rongeurs (Rodents), 5. Édentés (Edentates), 6. Pachydermes (Pachyderms), 7. Ruminants (Ruminants), 8. Cétacés (Cetaceans).
  - Oiseaux (Birds): 1. Oiseaux de proie (Birds of prey), 2. Passereaux (Passerines), 3. Grimpeurs (Piciformes), 4. Gallinacés (Gallinaceous birds), 5. Échassiers (Waders), 6. Palmipèdes (Anseriformes).
  - Reptiles (Reptiles, inc. Amphibians): 1. Chéloniens (Chelonii), 2. Sauriens (Lizards), 3. Ophidiens (Snakes), 4. Batraciens (Amphibians).
  - Poissons (Fishes): 1. Chrondroptérygiens à branchies fixes (Chondrichthyes), 2. Sturioniens ou Chrondroptérygiens à branchies libres (Sturgeons), 3. Plectognates (Tetraodontiformes), 4. Lophobranches (Syngnathidae), 5. Malacoptérygiens abdominaux, 6. Malacoptérygiens subbrachiens, 7. Malacoptérygiens apodes, 8. Acanthoptérygiens (Acanthopterygians).
- II. Mollusques. (Molluscs)
  - Céphalopodes. (Cephalopods)
  - Ptéropodes. (Pteropods)
  - Gastéropodes (Gastropods): 1. Nudibranches (Nudibranchs), 2. Inférobranches, 3. Tectibranches, 4. Pulmonés (Pulmonata), 5. Pectinibranches, 6. Scutibranches, 7. Cyclobranches.
  - Acéphales: 1. Testacés (Bivalves), 2. Sans coquilles (Tunicates).
  - Brachiopodes. (Brachiopods, now a separate phylum)
  - Cirrhopodes. (Barnacles, now in Crustacea)
- III. Articulés. (Articulated animals: now Arthropods and Annelids)
  - Annélides (Annelids): 1. Tubicoles, 2. Dorsibranches, 3. Abranches.
  - Crustacés (Crustaceans): 1. Décapodes (Decapods), 2. Stomapodes (Stomatopods), 3. Amphipodes (Amphipods), 4. Isopodes (Isopods), 5. Branchiopodes (Branchiopods).
  - Arachnides (Arachnids): 1. Pulmonaires, 2. Trachéennes.
  - Insectes (Insects, inc. Myriapods): 1. Myriapodes, 2. Thysanoures (Thysanura), 3. Parasites, 4. Suceurs, 5. Coléoptères (Coleoptera), 6. Orthoptères (Orthoptera), 7. Hémiptères (Hemiptera), 8. Névroptères (Neuroptera), 9. Hyménoptères (Hymenoptera), 10. Lépidoptères (Lepidoptera), 11. Ripiptères (Strepsiptera), 12. Diptères (Diptera).
- IV. Zoophytes. (Zoophytes, called Radiata in English translations; now Cnidaria and other phyla)
  - Échinodermes (Echinoderms): 1. Pédicellés, 2. Sans pieds.
  - Intestinaux (Helminths): 1. Cavitaires, 2. Parenchymateux.
  - Acalèphes (Jellyfish and other free-floating polyps): 1. Fixes, 2. Libres.
  - Polypes (Cnidaria): 1. Nus, 2. À polypiers.
  - Infusoires (Infusoria, various protistan phyla): 1. Rotifères (Rotifers), 2. Homogènes.

== Reception ==
=== Contemporary ===
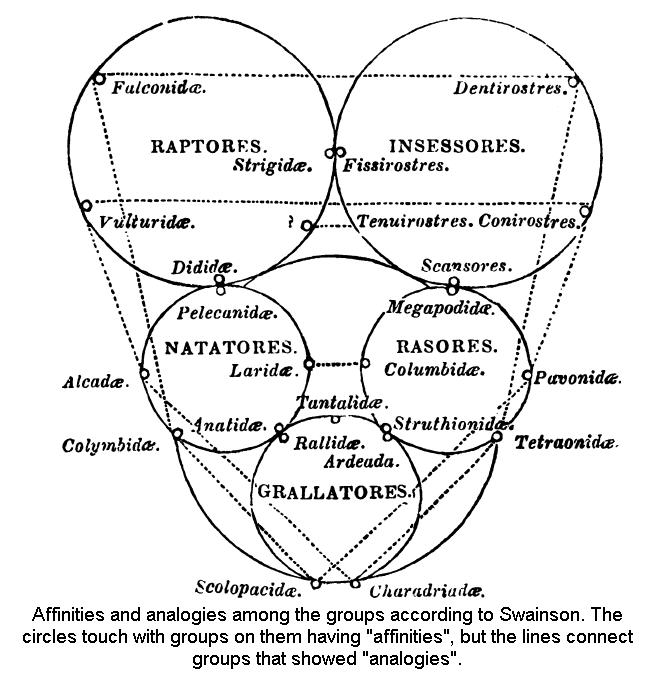
William Swainson's Quinarian classification of birds

The entomologist William Sharp Macleay, in his 1821 book Horae Entomologicae which put forward the short-lived "Quinarian" system of classification into 5 groups, each of 5 subgroups, etc., asserted that in the Règne Animal "Cuvier was notoriously deficient in the power of legitimate and intuitive generalization in arranging the animal series". The zoologist William Swainson, also a Quinarian, added that "no person of such transcendent talents and ingenuity, ever made so little use of his observations towards a natural arrangement as M. Cuvier."

The Magazine of Natural History of 1829 expressed surprise at the long interval between the first and second editions, surmising that there were too few scientific readers in France, apart from those in Paris itself; it notes that while the first volume was little changed, the treatment of fish was considerably altered in volume II, while the section on the Articulata was greatly enlarged (to two volumes, IV and V) and written by M. Latreille. It also expressed the hope that there would be an English equivalent of Cuvier's work, given the popularity of natural history resulting from the works of Thomas Bewick (A History of British Birds 1797–1804) and George Montagu (Ornithological Dictionary, 1802). The same review covers Félix Édouard Guérin-Méneville's Iconographie du Règne Animal de M. le Baron Cuvier, which offered illustrations of all Cuvier's genera (except for the birds).

The Foreign Review of 1830 broadly admired Cuvier's work, but disagreed with his classification. It commented that "From the comprehensive nature of the Règne Animal, embracing equally the structure and history of all the existing and extinct races of animals, this work may be viewed as an epitome of M. Cuvier's zoological labours; and it presents the best outline, which exists in any language, of the present state of zoology and comparative anatomy." The review continued less favourably, however, that "We cannot help thinking that the science of comparative anatomy is now so far advanced, as to afford the means of distributing the animal kingdom on some more uniform and philosophical principles,—as on the modifications of those systems or functions which are most general in the animal economy". The review argued that the vertebrate division relied on the presence of a vertebral column, "a part of the organization of comparatively little importance in the economy"; it found the basis of the mollusca on "the general softness of the body" no better; the choice of the presence of articulations no better either, in the third division; while in the fourth it points out that while the echinoderms may fit well into the chosen scheme, it did not apply "to the entozoa, zoophyta, and infusoria, which constitute by much the greatest portion of this division." But the review notes that "the general distribution of the animal kingdom established by M. Cuvier in this work, are founded on a more extensive and minute survey of the organization than had ever before been taken, and many of the most important distinctions among the orders and families are the result of his own researches."

Writing in the Monthly Review of 1834, the pre-Darwinian evolutionist surgeon Sir William Lawrence commented that "the Regne Animal of Cuvier is, in short, an abridged expression of the entire science. He carried the lights derived from his zoological researches into kindred but obscure parts of nature." Lawrence calls the work "an arrangement of the animal kingdom nearly approaching to perfection; grounded on principles so accurate, that the place which any animal occupies in this scheme, already indicates the leading circumstances in its structure, economy, and habits."

The book was in the library of HMS Beagle for Charles Darwin's voyage. In The Origin of Species (1859), in a chapter on the difficulties facing the theory, Darwin comments that "The expression of conditions of existence, (Note: "Conditions d'existence" is used in Cuvier's Introduction to volume 1 of Règne Animal, p. 6.) so often insisted on by the illustrious Cuvier, is fully embraced by the principle of natural selection." Darwin continues, reflecting both on Cuvier's emphasis on the conditions of existence, and Jean-Baptiste Lamarck's theory of acquiring heritable characteristics from those Cuvieran conditions: "For natural selection acts by either now adapting the varying parts of each being to its organic and inorganic conditions of life; or by having adapted them during long-past periods of time: the adaptations being aided in some cases by use and disuse, being slightly affected by the direct action of the external conditions of life, and being in all cases subjected to the several laws of growth. Hence, in fact, the law of the Conditions of Existence is the higher law; as it includes, through the inheritance of former adaptations, that of Unity of Type."

=== Modern ===
The palaeontologist Philippe Taquet wrote that "the Règne Animal was an attempt to create a complete inventory of the animal kingdom and to formulate a natural classification underpinned by the principles of the 'correlation of parts'.." He adds that with the book "Cuvier introduced clarity into natural history, accurately reproducing the actual ordering of animals." Taquet further notes that while Cuvier rejected evolution, it was paradoxically "the precision of his anatomical descriptions and the importance of his research on fossil bones", showing for instance that mammoths were extinct elephants, that enabled later naturalists including Darwin to argue convincingly that animals had evolved.
