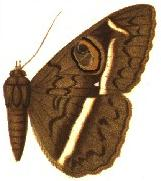
- Female
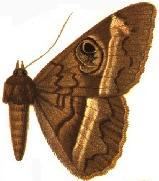
- Male

Scientific classification
- Kingdom: Animalia
- Phylum: Arthropoda
- Clade: Pancrustacea
- Class: Insecta
- Order: Lepidoptera
- Superfamily: Noctuoidea
- Family: Noctuidae (?)
- Genus: Cyligramma
- Species: C. magus

Binomial name
- Cyligramma magus (Guérin-Méneville, 1844)

Synonyms
- Erebus magus Guérin-Méneville, 1844; Cyligramma buchholzi Ploetz, 1880; Cyligramma goudotii Guenée, 1852

= Cyligramma magus =

Species of moth

Cyligramma magus is a moth of the family Noctuidae first described by Félix Édouard Guérin-Méneville in 1844. It is found in most of Sub-Saharan Africa.
