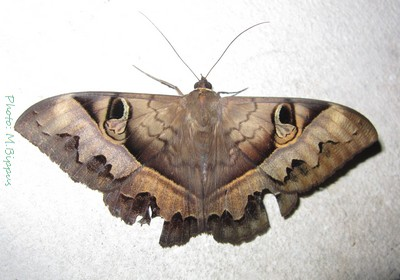

Scientific classification
- Domain: Eukaryota
- Kingdom: Animalia
- Phylum: Arthropoda
- Class: Insecta
- Order: Lepidoptera
- Superfamily: Noctuoidea
- Family: Noctuidae (?)
- Subfamily: Catocalinae
- Genus: Cyligramma; Boisduval, 1833

= Cyligramma =

Genus of moths

Cyligramma is a genus of moths of the family Noctuidae.

== Species ==
- Cyligramma amblyops Mabille, 1891
- Cyligramma conradsi Berio, 1954
- Cyligramma disturbans (Walker, 1858)
- Cyligramma duplex Guenée, 1852
- Cyligramma fluctuosa (Drury, 1773)
- Cyligramma griseata Gaede, 1936
- Cyligramma joa Boisduval, 1833
- Cyligramma latona (Cramer, 1775)
- Cyligramma limacina (Guerin-Meneville, 1832)
- Cyligramma magus (Guerin-Meneville, 1844)
- Cyligramma simplex Gruenberg, 1910
