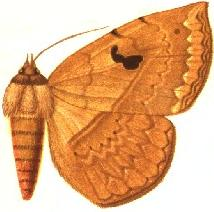

Scientific classification
- Kingdom: Animalia
- Phylum: Arthropoda
- Class: Insecta
- Order: Lepidoptera
- Superfamily: Noctuoidea
- Family: Noctuidae (?)
- Genus: Cyligramma
- Species: C. simplex

Binomial name
- Cyligramma simplex Gruenberg, 1910

= Cyligramma simplex =

Species of moth

Cyligramma simplex is a moth of the family Noctuidae. This moth species is commonly found in Nigeria.
