= Cyligramma conradsi =

Scientific classification
- Kingdom: Animalia
- Phylum: Arthropoda
- Class: Insecta
- Order: Lepidoptera
- Superfamily: Noctuoidea
- Family: Noctuidae (?)
- Genus: Cyligramma
- Species: C. conradsi

Binomial name
- Cyligramma conradsi Berio, 1954

Species of moth

Cyligramma conradsi is a moth of the family Noctuidae. This moth species is commonly found in Tanzania.
