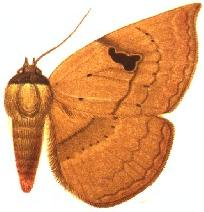

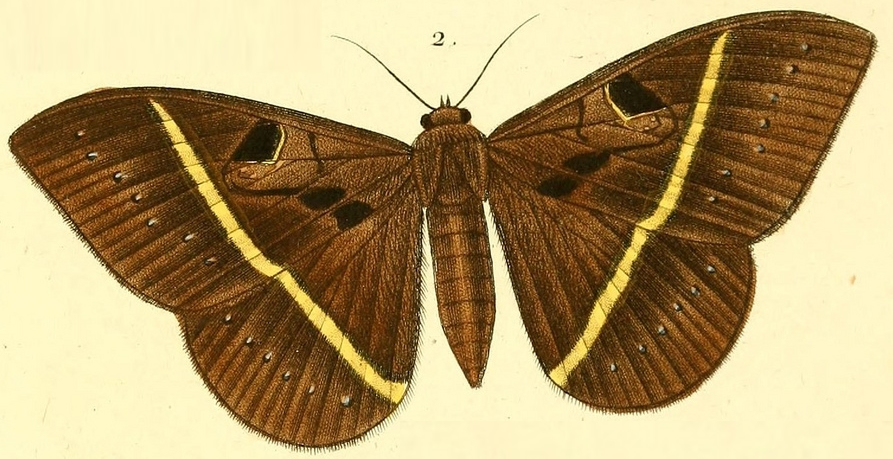

Scientific classification
- Domain: Eukaryota
- Kingdom: Animalia
- Phylum: Arthropoda
- Class: Insecta
- Order: Lepidoptera
- Superfamily: Noctuoidea
- Family: Noctuidae (?)
- Genus: Cyligramma
- Species: C. joa

Binomial name
- Cyligramma joa Boisduval, 1833

= Cyligramma joa =

Species of moth

Cyligramma joa is a moth of the family Noctuidae. This moth species is commonly found in Madagascar.
