= Zoophyte =

Obsolete term for organisms intermediate between animals and plants

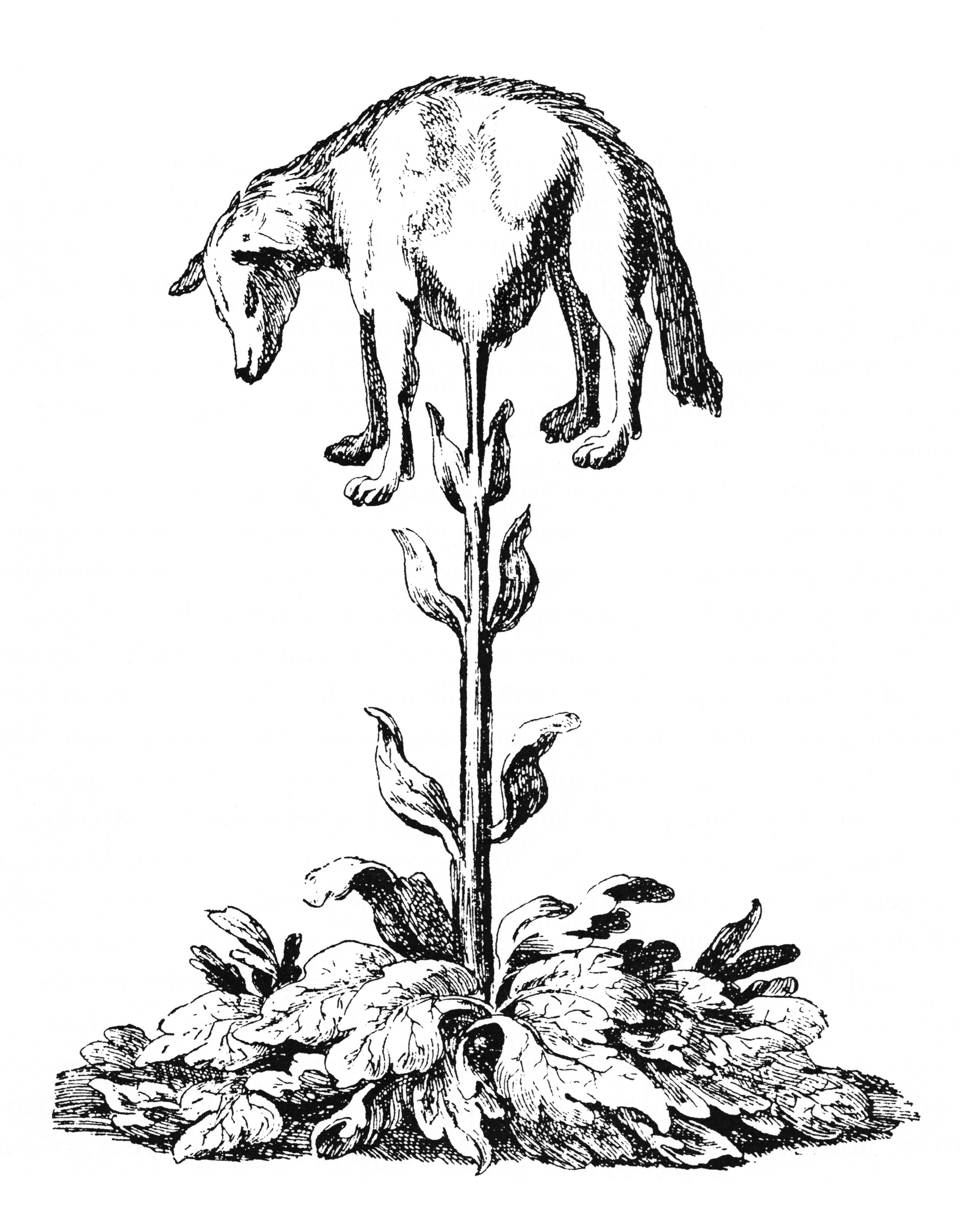
Tartar lamb illustration

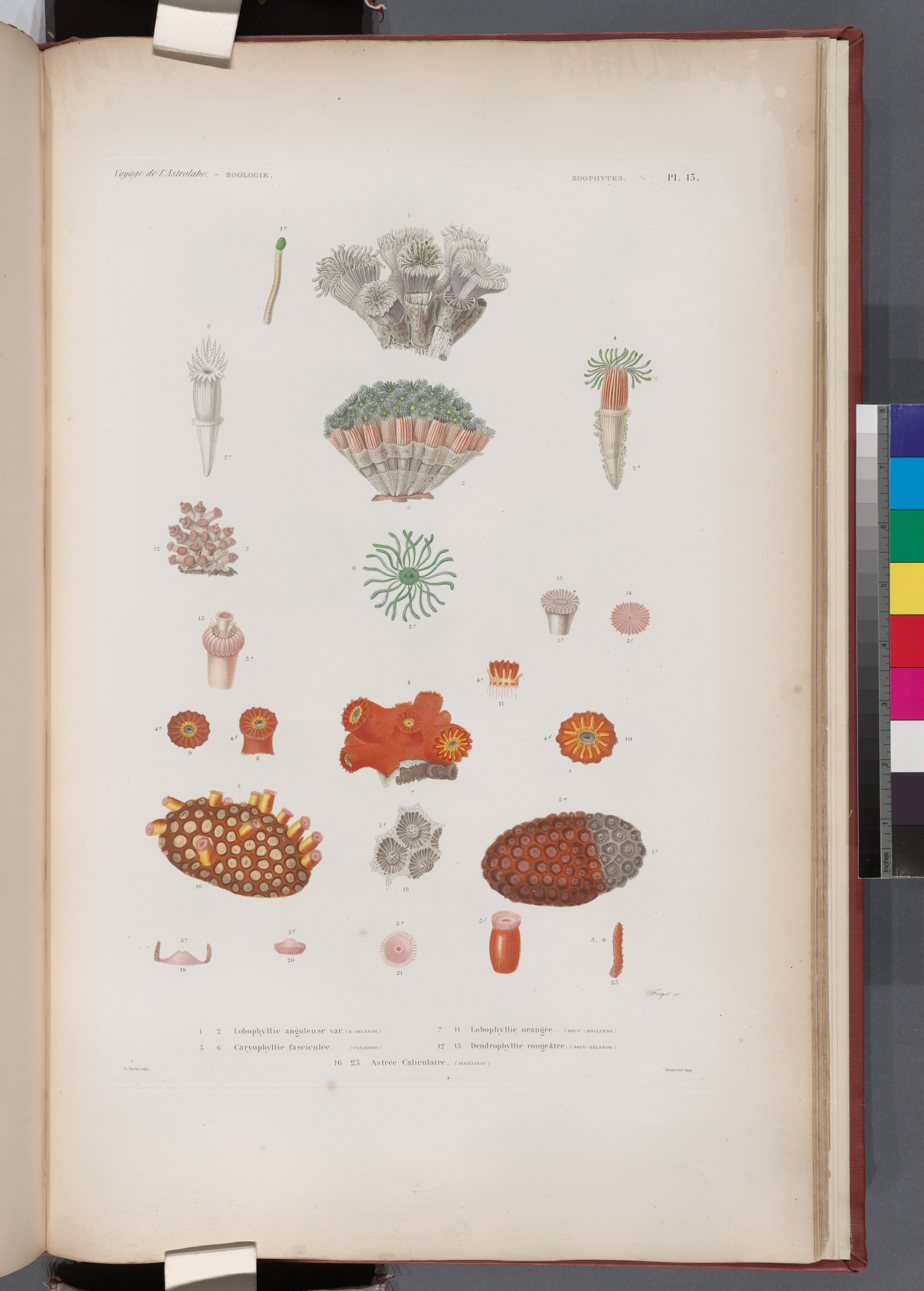
Zoophytes in 1833 book.

A zoophyte (animal-plant) is an obsolete term for an organism thought to be intermediate between animals and plants, or an animal with plant-like attributes or appearance. In the 19th century they were reclassified as Radiata which included various taxa, a term superseded by Coelenterata referring more narrowly to the animal phyla Cnidaria (coral animals, true jellies, sea anemones, sea pens, and their allies), sponges, and Ctenophora (comb jellies).

A group of strange creatures that exist somewhere on, or between, the boundaries of plant and animal kingdoms was the subject of considerable debate in the eighteenth century. Some naturalists believed that they were a blend of plant and animal; other naturalists considered them to be entirely either plant or animal (such as sea anemones).

== Ancient and medieval to early modern era ==
In Eastern cultures such as Ancient China fungi were classified as plants in the Traditional Chinese Medicine texts, and cordyceps, and in particular Ophiocordyceps sinensis, were considered zoophytes.

Zoophytes are common in medieval and renaissance era herbals, notable examples including the Tartar Lamb, a legendary plant which grew sheep as fruit. Zoophytes appeared in many influential early medical texts, such as Dioscorides's De Materia Medica and subsequent adaptations and commentaries on that work, notably Mattioli's Discorsi. Zoophytes are frequently seen as medieval attempts to explain the origins of exotic, unknown plants with strange properties (such as cotton, in the case of the Tartar Lamb as theorized by Henry Lee, Fellow of the Linnean Society in the book The Vegetable Lamb of Tartary).

Reports of zoophytes continued into the seventeenth century and were commented on by many influential thinkers of the time period, including Francis Bacon. It was not until 1646 that claims of zoophytes began to be concretely refuted, and skepticism towards claims of zoophytes mounted throughout the seventeenth and eighteenth centuries.

== 18th to 19th century, natural history ==
As natural history and natural philosophy developed in the 18th century, there was considerable debate and disagreements between naturalists about organisms on or near the boundary between the animal and plant kingdoms, and how to relate them in taxonomy. Interest in the topic began in the 1730s with the research by Abraham Trembley into polyps.

When Carl Linnaeus published the 10th edition of Systema Naturae in 1758, marking the start of zoological nomenclature, he set out three divisions of the Kingdom of Nature: rocks, plants and animals, "though all three exist in the lithophytes", the corals. He defined zoophytes as "a composite small organism, with both animal and plant characteristics". He acknowledged contributions from the coralline expert Ellis by describing him as a "lynx-eyed discoverer of zoophytes". In 1761 he wrote to Ellis that "zoophytes have a mere vegetable life, and are increased every year under their bark, like trees" as shown by growth rings on the trunk of Gorgonia, they are "therefore vegetables, with flowers like small animals. As zoophytes are, many of them, covered with a stony coat, the Creator has been pleased that they should receive nourishment by their naked flowers. He has therefore furnished each with a pore, which we call a mouth." After wide research, in 1786 Ellis was still unconvinced "what or where the link is that divides the animal and vegetable kingdoms of Nature", and pressed Linnaeus to classify most as animals. He subsequently proposed that the animals of the corals construct their own structures, in a book completed by Daniel Solander.

Georges Cuvier in his Le Règne Animal of 1817 titled one of his four divisions (Embranchements) of the animal kingdom "Les Zoophytes ou Animaux Rayonnés". An 1834 English translation uses the term Radiata, and titles the division "The Zoophytes, or Animalia Radiata", an expanded 1840 translation notes that "Neither of these names is literally applicable, for all the animals in the division are not radiated; and the very name Zoophyte, 'plant - animal,' is a contradiction. In England, the term Zoophyte is much more restricted than in France, but it is equally inapplicable, excepting, perhaps, to those species, about which there are still disputes as to whether they are animals or vegetables." Despite its scientific obsolescence, Charles Darwin continued to use the term throughout his studies.
