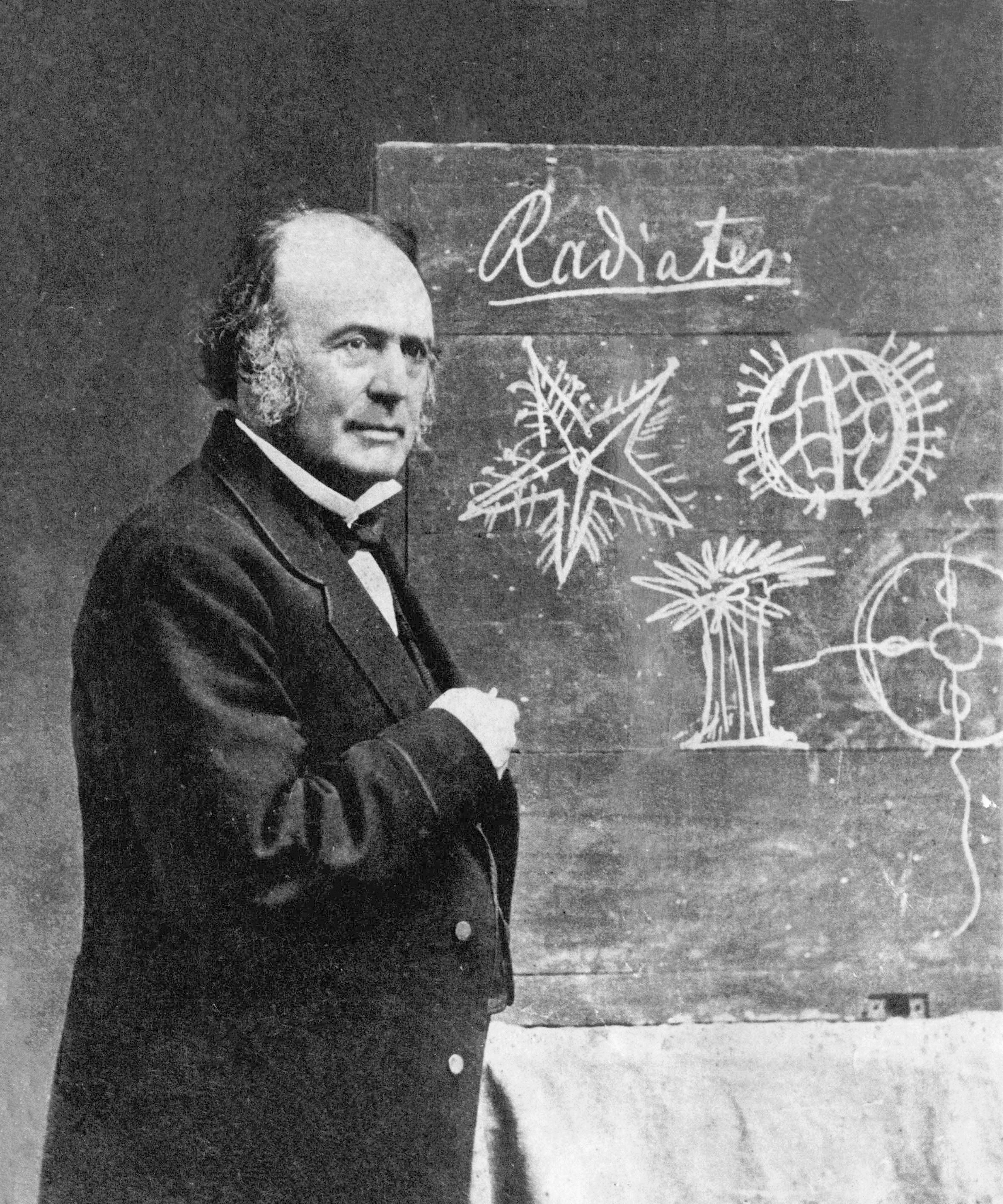
- Louis Agassiz in 1870, with drawings of animals then considered Radiates

Scientific classification
- Kingdom: Animalia
- Subkingdom: Eumetazoa
- (unranked): Radiata

= Radiata =

Radiata Temporal range: Ediacaran – Present

Historical taxonomic rank

Radiata or Radiates is a historical taxonomic rank that was used to classify animals with radially symmetric body plans. The term Radiata is no longer accepted, as it united several different groupings of animals that do not form a monophyletic group under current views of animal phylogeny. The similarities once offered in justification of the taxon, such as radial symmetry, are now taken to be the result of either incorrect evaluations by early researchers or convergent evolution, rather than an indication of a common ancestor. Because of this, the term is used mostly in a historical context.

In the early 19th century, Georges Cuvier united Ctenophora and Cnidaria in the Radiata (Zoophytes). Thomas Cavalier-Smith, in 1983, redefined Radiata as a subkingdom consisting of Myxozoa, Placozoa, Cnidaria and Ctenophora. Lynn Margulis and K. V. Schwartz later redefined Radiata in their Five Kingdom classification, this time including only Cnidaria and Ctenophora. This definition is similar to the historical descriptor Coelenterata, which has also been proposed as a group encompassing Cnidaria and Ctenophora.

Although radial symmetry is usually given as a defining characteristic in animals that have been classified in this group, there are clear exceptions and qualifications. Echinoderms, for example, exhibit unmistakable bilateral symmetry as larvae, and are now in the Bilateria. Ctenophores exhibit biradial or rotational symmetry, defined by tentacular and pharyngeal axes, on which two anal canals are located in two diametrically opposed quadrants. Some species within the cnidarian class Anthozoa are bilaterally symmetric (For example, Nematostella vectensis). It has been suggested that bilateral symmetry may have evolved before the split between Cnidaria and Bilateria, and that the radially symmetrical cnidarians have secondarily evolved radial symmetry, meaning the bilaterality in cnidarian species like N. vectensis has a primary origin.

The differing definitions assigned by zoologists are listed in the table.

| Author | Work | Date | Name of group | Taxa included | Level of group |
|---|---|---|---|---|---|
| Cuvier | Le Règne Animal | 1817 | Zoophytes (Radiata in English translations) | Échinodermes, Intestinaux (parasitic worms), Acalèphes (Ctenophora), Polypes (Cnidaria), Infusoires | Embranchement (1 of 4) |
| Cavalier-Smith | "A 6-kingdom classification and a unified phylogeny" | 1983 | Radiata | Myxozoa, Placozoa, Cnidaria, Ctenophora | Subkingdom |
| Margulis, Schwartz | Five Kingdoms | 1988 | Radiata | Cnidaria, Ctenophora | Subkingdom |
| Philippe et al. | "Phylogenomics Revives Traditional Views on Deep Animal Relationships" | 2009 | Coelenterata | Cnidaria, Ctenophora | Proposed clade |
