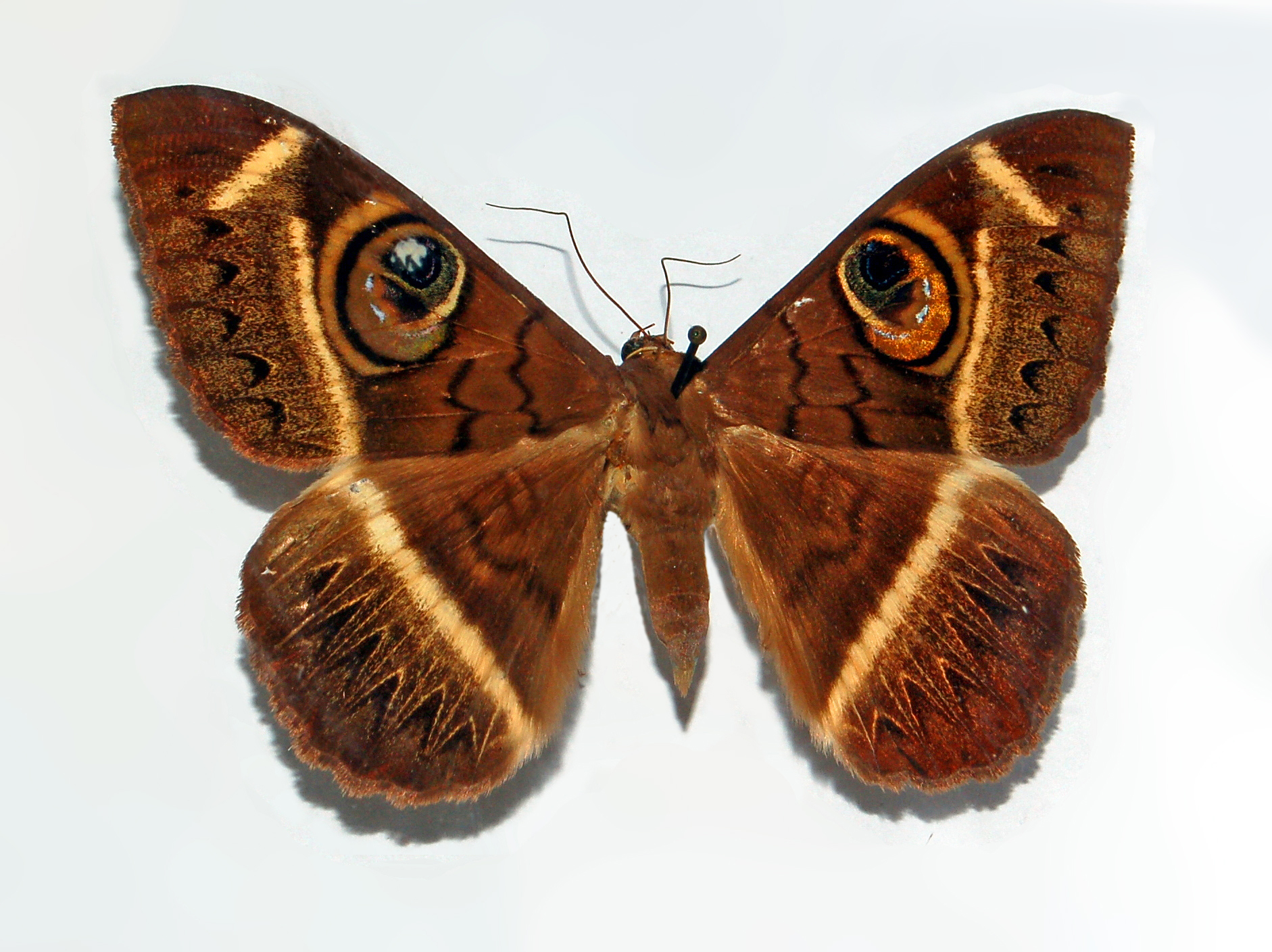
- Mounted specimen from Angola

Scientific classification
- Kingdom: Animalia
- Phylum: Arthropoda
- Clade: Pancrustacea
- Class: Insecta
- Order: Lepidoptera
- Superfamily: Noctuoidea
- Family: Noctuidae (?)
- Genus: Cyligramma
- Species: C. latona

Binomial name
- Cyligramma latona (Cramer, 1775)

Synonyms
- Phalaena latona Cramer, 1775; Noctua latona Cramer, 1775; Cyligramma troglodyta (Fabricius, 1794); Noctua troglodyta Fabricius, 1794

= Cyligramma latona =

Cream-striped owl

Species of moth

Cyligramma latona, the cream-striped owl, is a moth of the family Noctuidae. The species was first described by Pieter Cramer in 1775.

== Description ==
Cyligramma latona has a wingspan reaching 75–100 millimetres (3.0–3.9 in). The uppersides of the wings are brown, with a yellowish band crossing all the wings and a large eyespot on the forewings. The larvae feed on Acacia species.

== Distribution ==
This widespread and common species can be found in western Sub-Saharan Africa, including Egypt and Guinea. It can also be found in southern Africa.

== Gallery ==
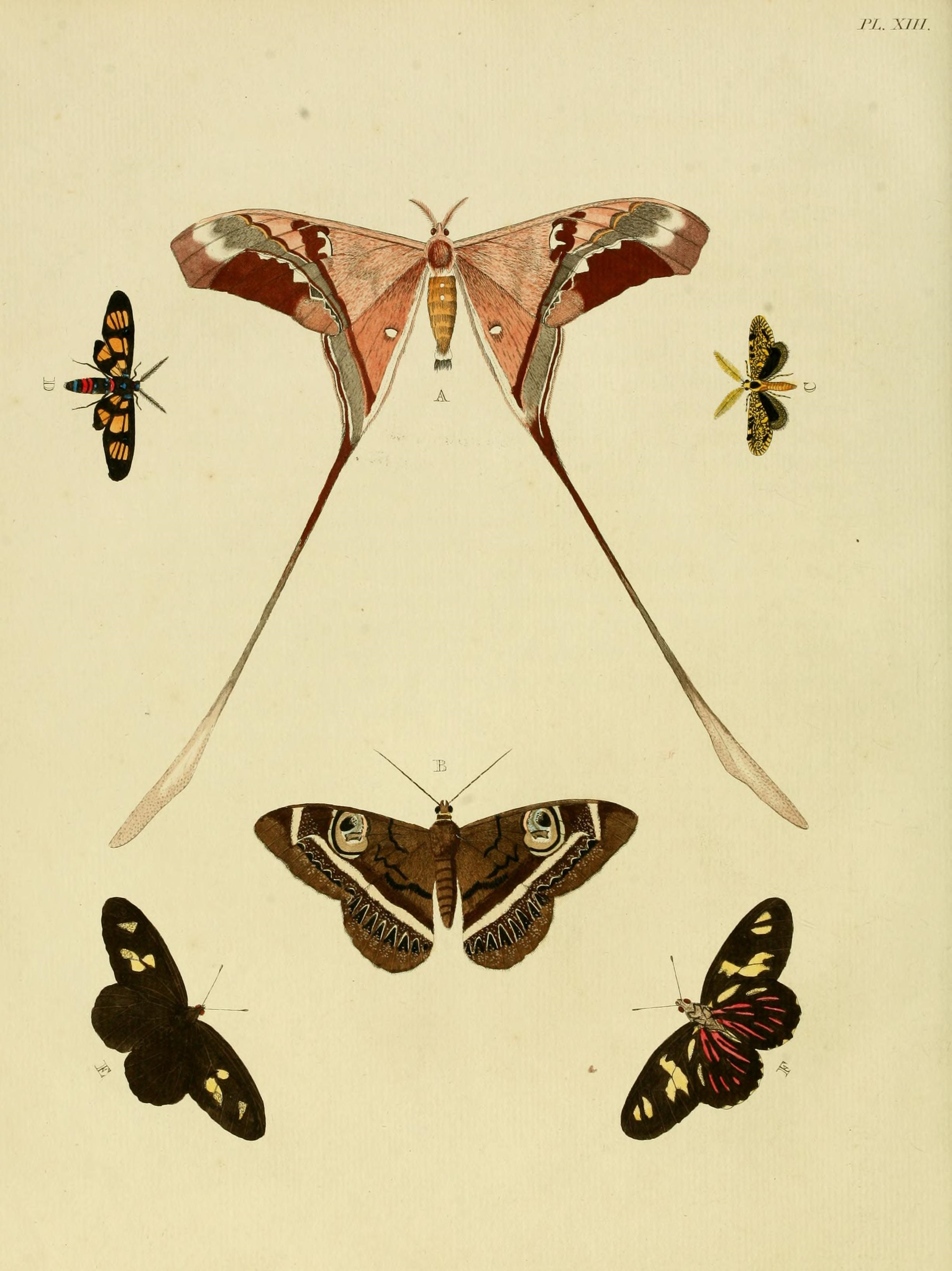
Illustration from Papillons exotiques des trois parties du monde (1779)

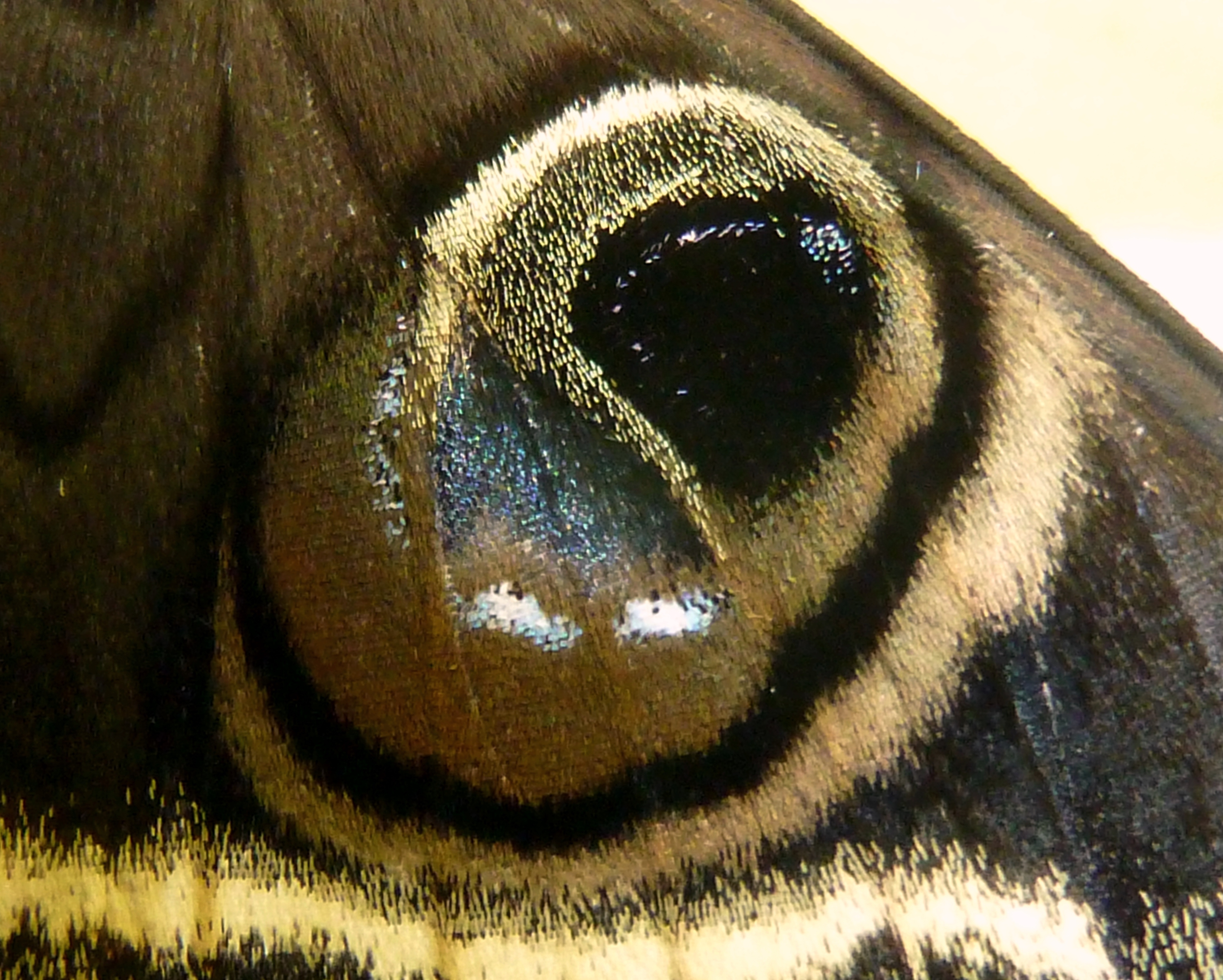
Detail of the eyespot
