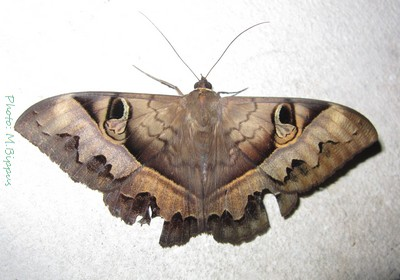

Scientific classification
- Domain: Eukaryota
- Kingdom: Animalia
- Phylum: Arthropoda
- Class: Insecta
- Order: Lepidoptera
- Superfamily: Noctuoidea
- Family: Noctuidae (?)
- Genus: Cyligramma
- Species: C. fluctuosa

Binomial name
- Cyligramma fluctuosa (Drury, 1773)

Synonyms
- Phalaena fluctuosa Drury, 1773; Noctua fluctuosa Drury, 1773; Cyligramma rudilinea Walker, 1858

= Cyligramma fluctuosa =

Species of moth

Cyligramma fluctuosa is a moth of the family Noctuidae. It is found in most parts of Africa, from Sénégal in the West to Kenya in the East, and Egypt in the North to South Africa, including the Indian Ocean islands

It has a wingspan of approx. 8–9 cm.
