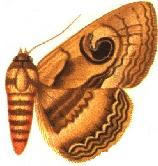
- C. disturbans female
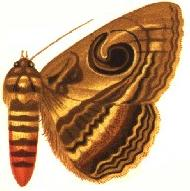
- C. disturbans male

Scientific classification
- Kingdom: Animalia
- Phylum: Arthropoda
- Class: Insecta
- Order: Lepidoptera
- Superfamily: Noctuoidea
- Family: Noctuidae (?)
- Genus: Cyligramma
- Species: C. disturbans

Binomial name
- Cyligramma disturbans (Walker, 1858)

Synonyms
- Nyctipao disturbans Walker, 1858; Cyligramma concors Mabille, 1881; Cyligramma consiliatrix Saalmüller, 1891; Cyligramma conturbans Walker, 1858; Cyligramma raboudou Lucas, 1872

= Cyligramma disturbans =

Species of moth

Cyligramma disturbans is a moth of the family Noctuidae. This moth species is commonly found in Madagascar, as well as India.

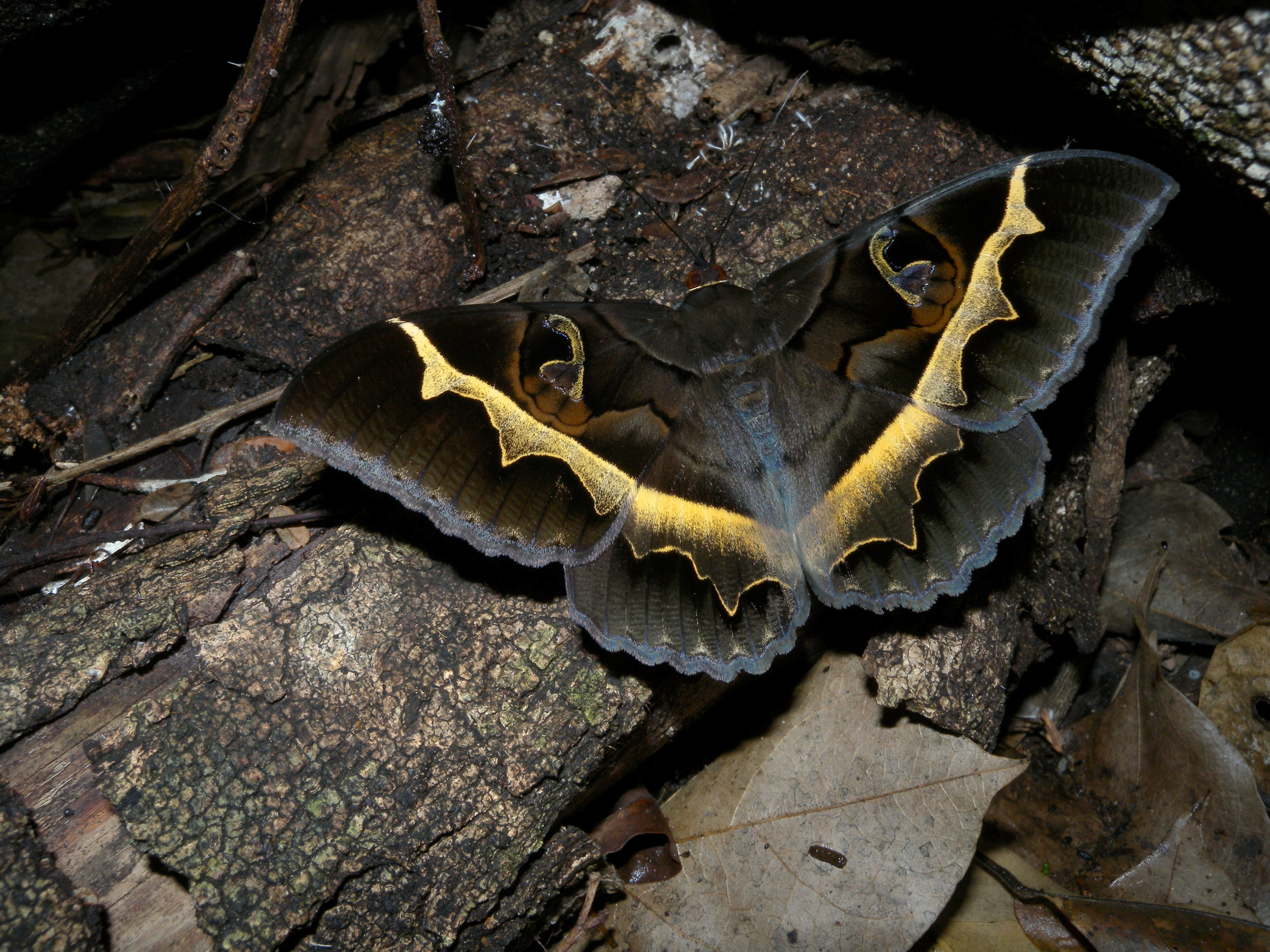
Cyligramma disturbans
