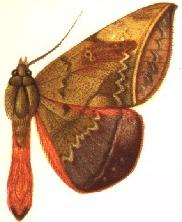

Scientific classification
- Kingdom: Animalia
- Phylum: Arthropoda
- Class: Insecta
- Order: Lepidoptera
- Superfamily: Noctuoidea
- Family: Noctuidae (?)
- Genus: Cyligramma
- Species: C. amblyops

Binomial name
- Cyligramma amblyops Mabille, 1891

= Cyligramma amblyops =

Species of moth

Cyligramma amblyops is a moth of the family Noctuidae. This species of moth is commonly found in the Gold Coast region of Western Africa, now part of Ghana.
