= Christophe Annedouche =

French engraver (1803–1866)

Christophe Annedouche (28 June 1803 – 10 June 1866) was a French engraver from Paris. He is known for his natural history illustrations in works such as Georges Cuvier's Le Règne Animal.

== Biography ==
On March 29, 1832, Annedouche married Marie Louise Sebin. They had three children, Emile Alexandre, Joseph Alfred and Jules André, and lived in Paris. Joseph Alfred was like his father a well-known engraver and artist. When he exhibited at the Royal Museum in 1845, he was living at Rue St-Jacques.

He engraved some plates on behalf of Jean-Gabriel Prêtre for the 1821 Faune française, ou Histoire naturelle, générale et particulière des animaux qui se trouvent en France, and some for later editions of Georges Cuvier's Le Règne Animal. In Exploration scientifique de l'Algérie pendant les années 1840, 1841, 1842 he engraved plates including one of an Arabian bustard, painted by A.J.B. Vaillant.

In the Magasin de zoologie he engraved works by artists including Léon Daniel de Joannis, Prêtre, Louis Victor Bevalet and Émile Théophile Blanchard.

== Works ==
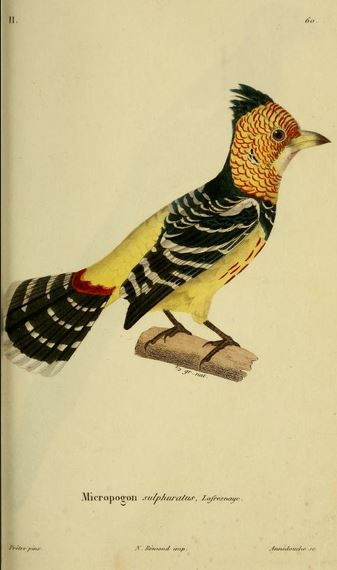
Trachyphonus vaillantii painted by Jean-Gabriel Prêtre, engraved by Annedouche

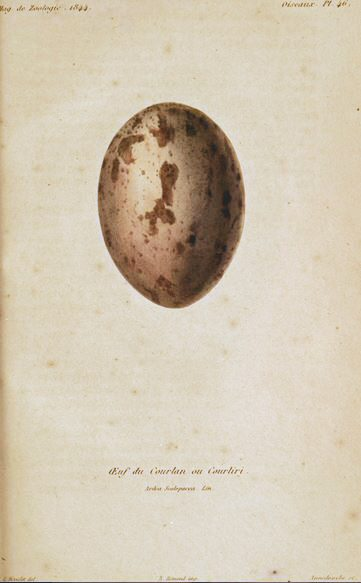
Egg of Aramus guarauna painted by Louis Victor Bevalet (1808–), engraved by Annedouche

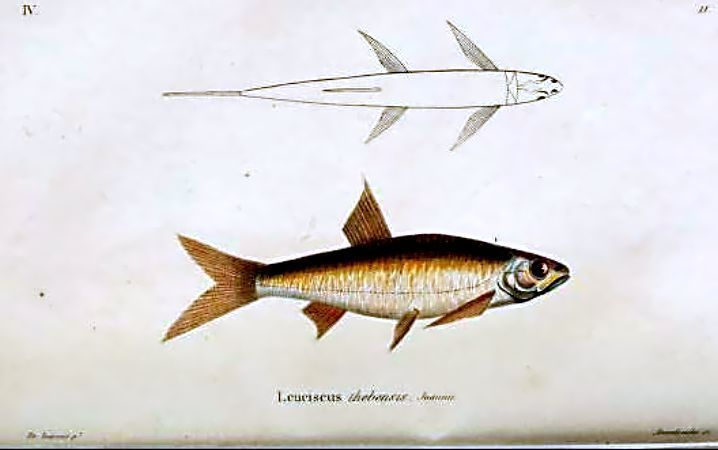
Leptocypris niloticus painted by Léon Daniel de Joannis (1803–1868), engraved by Annedouche

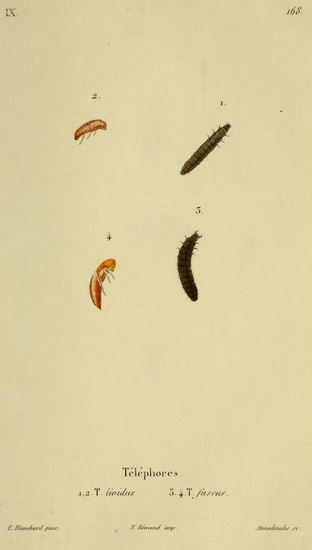
Larvae of Cantharis fusca and Cantharis livida painted by Émile Théophile Blanchard (1795–1877), engraved by Annedouche

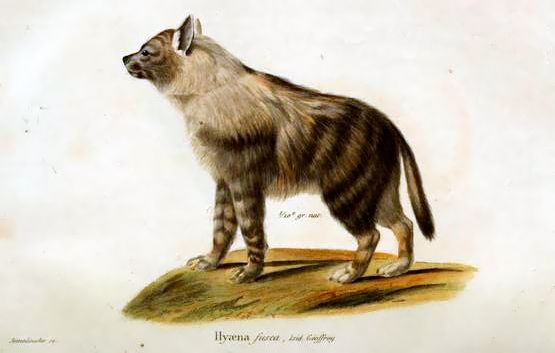
Brown hyena engraved by Annedouche

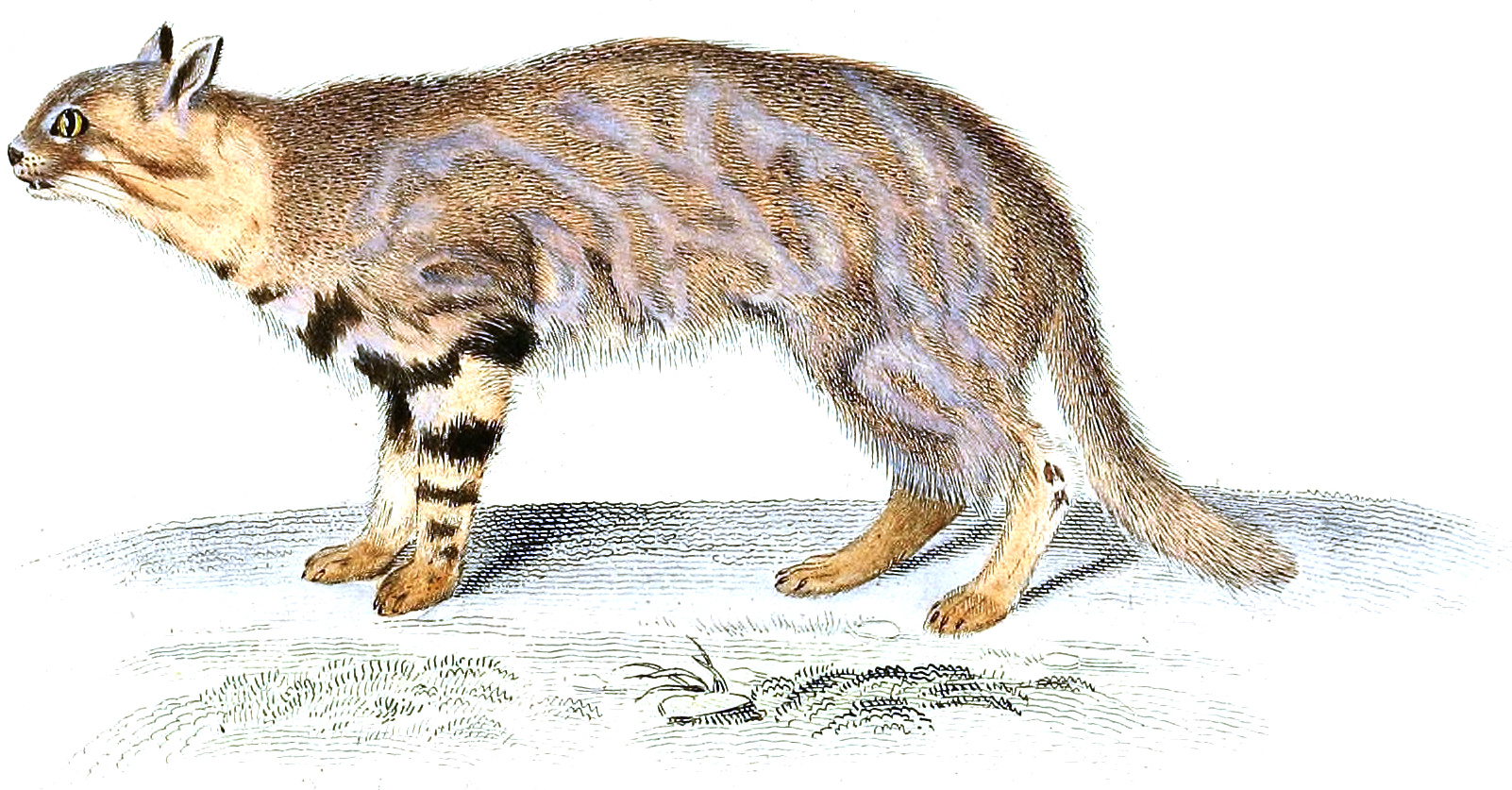
Leopardus pajeros painted by Jean-Gabriel Prêtre, engraved by Annedouche

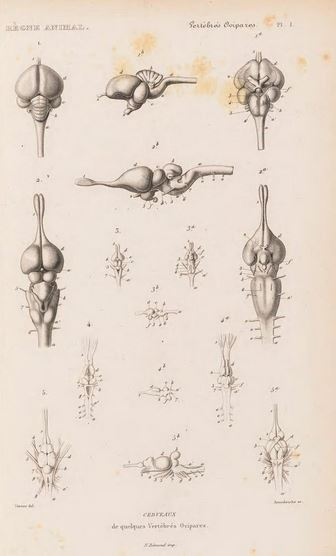
Vertebrate brains painted by Jacques Christophe Werner (1798–1856), engraved by Annedouche

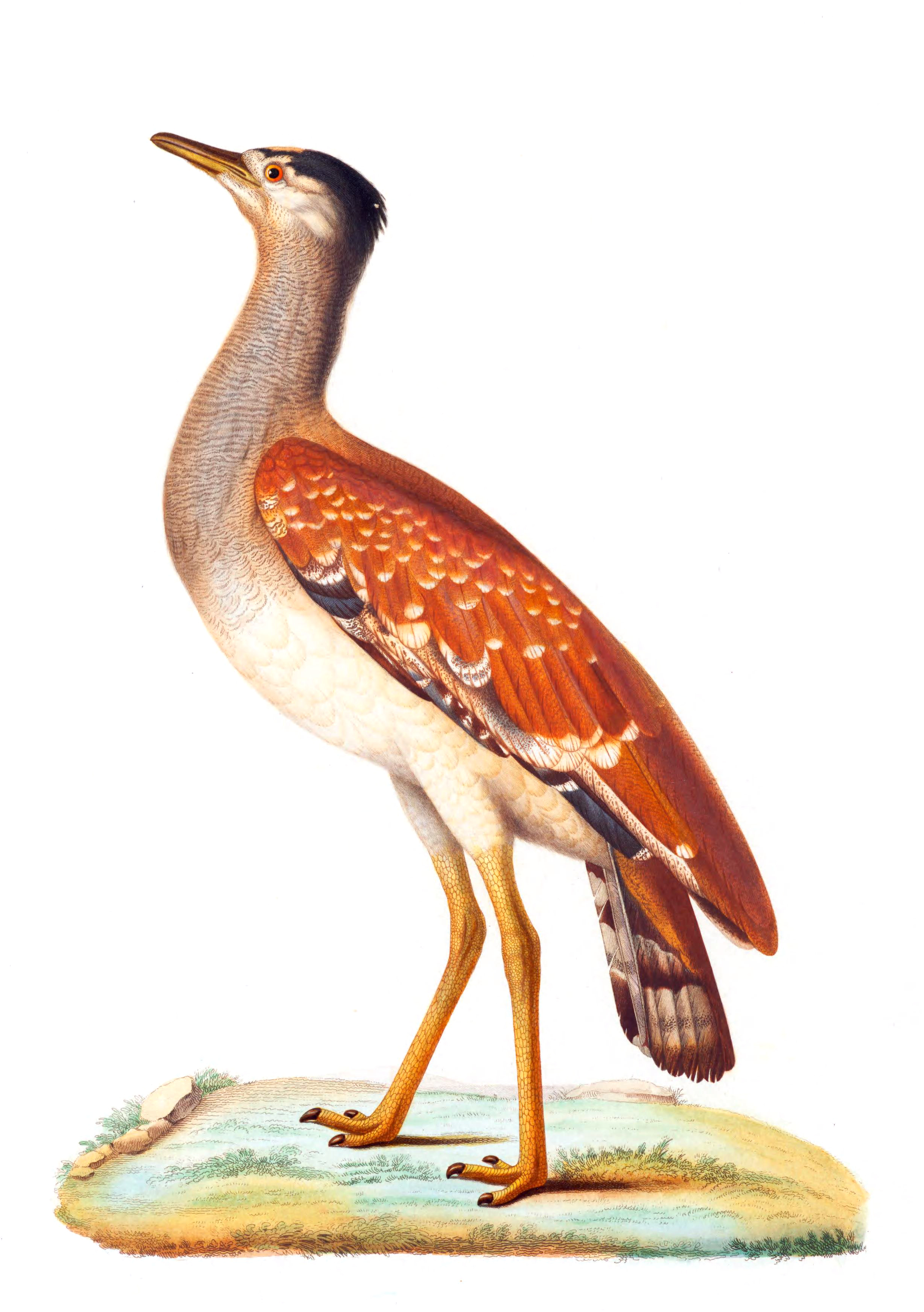
Ardeotis arabs painted by A.J.B. Vaillant (1817–1852), engraved by Annedouche

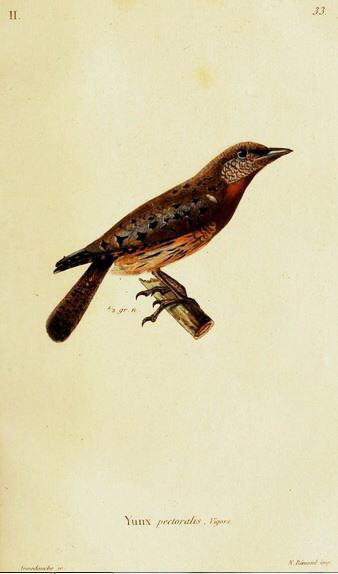
Wryneck after engraving by Annedouche

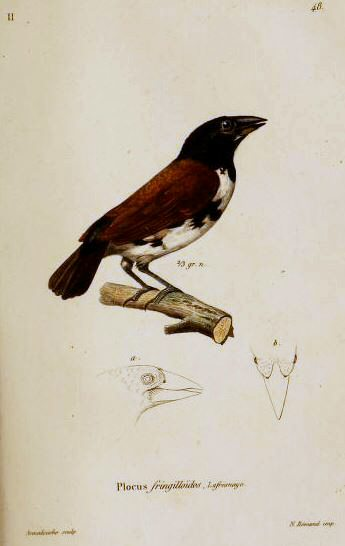
Lonchura fringilloides after engraving by Annedouche

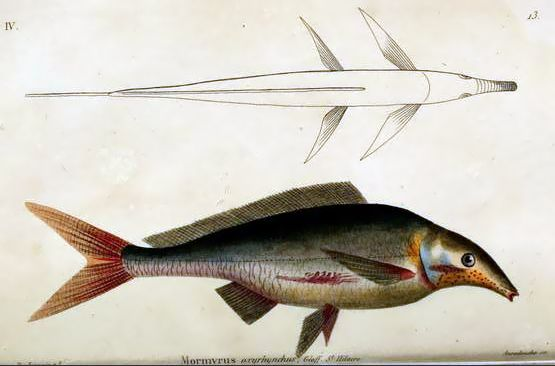
Mormyrus kannume engraving by Annedouche

== Sources ==
- François Guillaume Dumas, Ludovic Baschet (1845). Explication des ouvrages de peinture et dessins, sculpture, architecture et gravure des artistes vivans, exposés au Musée Royal Le 15 Mars 1845. Vinchon, Fils et Successeur de Mme Ve Ballard.
- René Ronsil (1957). L'Art français dans le livre d'oiseaux (Eléments d'une iconographie ornithologique française). Supplément à L'Oiseau et la Revue française d'Ornithologie. Vol. 28.
