= Cyligramma griseata =

Scientific classification
- Domain: Eukaryota
- Kingdom: Animalia
- Phylum: Arthropoda
- Class: Insecta
- Order: Lepidoptera
- Superfamily: Noctuoidea
- Family: Noctuidae (?)
- Genus: Cyligramma
- Species: C. griseata

Binomial name
- Cyligramma griseata Gaede, 1936

Species of moth

Cyligramma griseata is a moth of the family Noctuidae. It is found in Africa, including Nigeria and Uganda.
