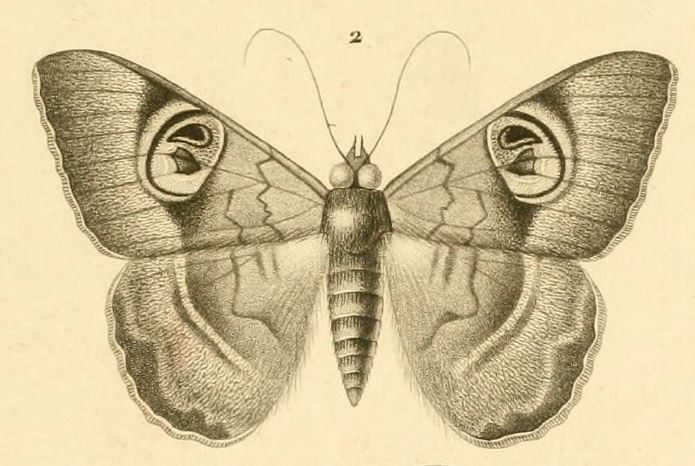
- Cyligramma limacina. Illustration from Iconographie du Règne Animal de G. Cuvier 1829–1844 by Félix Édouard Guérin-Méneville, who also described the species.

Scientific classification
- Kingdom: Animalia
- Phylum: Arthropoda
- Clade: Pancrustacea
- Class: Insecta
- Order: Lepidoptera
- Superfamily: Noctuoidea
- Family: Noctuidae (?)
- Genus: Cyligramma
- Species: C. limacina

Binomial name
- Cyligramma limacina (Guerin-Meneville, 1832)

Synonyms
- Erebus limacina Guerin-Meneville, 1832; Cyligramma acutior Guenée, 1852; Cyligramma argillosa Guenée, 1852; Cyligramma bisignata Walker, 1858; Cyligramma importuna Keferstein, 1870; Cyligramma interlecta Keferstein, 1870

= Cyligramma limacina =

Species of moth

Cyligramma limacina is a moth of the family Erebidae. It is found in Africa, including Senegal, Mauritius, and Madagascar.
