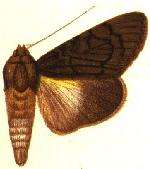
- Audea endophaea

Scientific classification
- Kingdom: Animalia
- Phylum: Arthropoda
- Class: Insecta
- Order: Lepidoptera
- Superfamily: Noctuoidea
- Family: Erebidae
- Subfamily: Erebinae
- Tribe: Audeini
- Genus: Audea; Walker, 1858

Synonyms
- Davea Berio, 1960

= Audea =

Genus of moths

Audea is a genus of moths in the family Erebidae.

== Species ==
- bipunctata species group
  - Audea agrotidea (Mabille, 1879)
  - Audea bipunctata Walker, 1858 (syn. Audea hypostigmata Hampson, 1913, Audea fatua (Felder and Rogenhofer, 1874))
  - Audea hemihyala Karsch, 1896 (syn. Audea endophaea Hampson, 1913)
  - Audea melaleuca Walker, 1865 (syn. Audea postalbida Berio, 1954)
  - Audea melanoplaga Hampson, 1902
  - Audea melanoptera Berio, 1985
  - Audea nigrior Kühne, 2005
  - Audea stenophaea Hampson, 1913
  - Audea watusi Kühne, 2005
  - Audea zimmeri Berio, 1954
- delphinensis species group
  - Audea delphinensis (Viette, 1966)
  - Audea jonasi Kühne, 2005
  - Audea subligata Distant, 1902
  - Audea vadoni (Viette, 1966)
- tegulata species group
  - Audea albiforma Kühne, 2005
  - Audea blochwitzi Kühne, 2005
  - Audea irioleuca (Meyrick, 1897)
  - Audea kathrina Kühne, 2005
  - Audea luteoforma Kühne, 2005
  - Audea paulumnodosa Kühne, 2005
  - Audea tachosoides Kühne, 2005
  - Audea tegulata Hampson, 1902 (syn. Audea humeralis Hampson, 1902)

== Formerly placed here ==
- Audea albifasciata Pinhey, 1968
- Audea antennalis Berio, 1954
- Audea arabica is now considered a synonym of Ulotrichopus tinctipennis Rebel, 1907
- Audea fatilega (Felder and Rogenhofer, 1874)
- Audea fumata (Wallengren, 1860)
- Audea guichardi Wiltshire, 1982
- Audea legrandi Berio, 1959
- Audea pseudocatocala Strand, 1918
