= Macula (disambiguation) =

A macula is a spot on the retina of the human eye.

Macula may also refer to:

== Science and medicine ==
- Macula (archaeology), a feature visible on an aerial photograph but with no identifiable function
- Macula (planetary geology), a dark area on the surface of a planet or moon
- Macula of saccule, in the human ear
- Macula of utricle, in the human ear
- Macula adhaerens, a cell structure specialized for cell-to-cell adhesion
- Macula densa, a group of cells in the kidney that stain darker histologically

=== Species ===
- Astylopsis macula, a beetle of family Cerambycidae
- Gibberula macula, a sea snail of family Cystiscidae
- Goniotorna macula, a moth of family Tortricidae
- Ortalotrypeta macula, a fruit fly of family Tephritidae
- Schrankia macula, a moth of family Erebidae
- Ulotrichopus macula, a moth of family Erebidae

== Other uses ==
- Macula (footballer) (born 1968), Brazilian footballer
- A mortal sin in Catholicism
