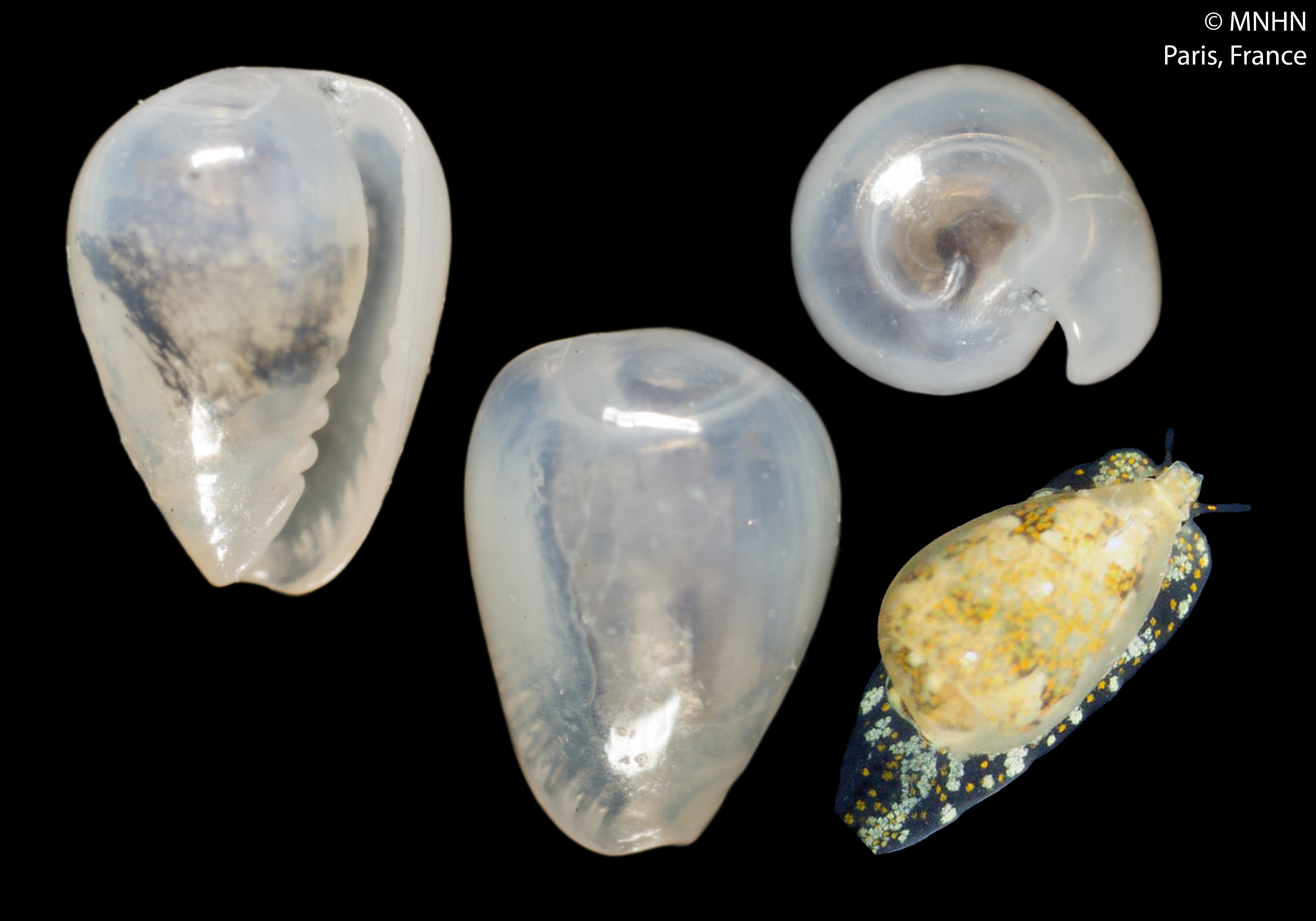
- Shell of Gibberula crassa (holotype at MNHN, Paris)

Scientific classification
- Kingdom: Animalia
- Phylum: Mollusca
- Class: Gastropoda
- Subclass: Caenogastropoda
- Order: Neogastropoda
- Family: Cystiscidae
- Subfamily: Cystiscinae
- Genus: Gibberula
- Species: G. crassa

Binomial name
- Gibberula crassa McCleery, 2009

= Gibberula crassa =

Species of gastropod

Gibberula crassa is a species of very small sea snail. It is a marine gastropod micromollusc in the family Cystiscidae.

== Etymology ==
The specific name crassa derives from the Latin word for thick, referring to its wide shell.

== Description ==
The closest intrageneric relatives of Gibberula crassa are Gibberula macula, Gibberula ubitaensis and Gibberula ubitalta. Typically, it possesses a wide shell with a length of 1.77 mm, a strong inward curve and a slightly indented axial fold.

== Distribution ==
This species occurs in the Caribbean Sea off Panama at depths ranging from 41 meters - 95 meters deep.
