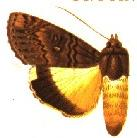
- Ulotrichopus stertzi

Scientific classification
- Kingdom: Animalia
- Phylum: Arthropoda
- Class: Insecta
- Order: Lepidoptera
- Superfamily: Noctuoidea
- Family: Erebidae
- Tribe: Catocalini
- Genus: Ulotrichopus; Wallengren, 1860

Synonyms
- Alura Möschler, 1883; Ulothrichopus Wallengren, 1865; Ulotricopus Hampson, 1902; Ulthrichopus Wallengren, 1865

= Ulotrichopus =

Genus of moths

Ulotrichopus is a genus of moths in the family Erebidae. The genus was described by Wallengren in 1860.

== Species ==
- Ulotrichopus catocala (Felder and Rogenhofer, 1874)
- Ulotrichopus dinawa Bethune-Baker, 1906
- Ulotrichopus eugeniae Saldaitis & Ivinskis, 2010
- Ulotrichopus fatilega (Felder & Rogenhofer, 1874)
- Ulotrichopus longipalpus Joicey and Talbot, 1915
- Ulotrichopus macula (Hampson, 1891)
- Ulotrichopus marmoratus Griveaud and Viette, 1961
- Ulotrichopus mesoleuca (Walker, 1858)
- Ulotrichopus meyi Kühne, 2005
- Ulotrichopus nigricans Laporte, 1973
- Ulotrichopus ochreipennis (Butler, 1878)
- Ulotrichopus phaeoleucus Hampson, 1913
  - Ulotrichopus phaeoleucus griseus Kühne, 2005
- Ulotrichopus phaeopera Hampson, 1913
- Ulotrichopus primulina (Hampson, 1902)
- Ulotrichopus pseudocatocala (Strand, 1918)
- Ulotrichopus pseudomarmoratus Kühne, 2005
- Ulotrichopus rama (Moore, 1885)
- Ulotrichopus recchiai Berio, 1978
- Ulotrichopus stertzi (Püngeler, 1907)
- Ulotrichopus sumatrensis L. B. Prout, 1928
- Ulotrichopus tinctipennis (Hampson, 1902)
- Ulotrichopus trisa (Swinhoe, 1899)
- Ulotrichopus usambarae Kühne, 2005
- Ulotrichopus variegata (Hampson, 1902)
- Ulotrichopus varius Kühne, 2005

== Formerly placed here ==
- Ulotrichopus catocaloides Strand
- Ulotrichopus glaucescens
- Ulotrichopus leucopasta
- Ulotrichopus lucidus Pinhey, 1968
- Ulotrichopus maccvoodi Hampson, 1913 is now considered to be a synonym of Catocala sponsalis Walker, 1858
- Ulotrichopus tessmanni Gaede, 1936
- Ulotrichopus tortuosus Wallengren, 1860
