= Audea agrotidea =

Scientific classification
- Kingdom: Animalia
- Phylum: Arthropoda
- Class: Insecta
- Order: Lepidoptera
- Superfamily: Noctuoidea
- Family: Erebidae
- Genus: Audea
- Species: A. agrotidea

Binomial name
- Audea agrotidea (Mabille, 1879)

Synonyms
- Bolina agrotidea Mabille, 1879

Species of moth

Audea agrotidea is a moth of the family Erebidae. It is found in Madagascar.
