= Ulotrichopus recchiai =

Scientific classification
- Domain: Eukaryota
- Kingdom: Animalia
- Phylum: Arthropoda
- Class: Insecta
- Order: Lepidoptera
- Superfamily: Noctuoidea
- Family: Erebidae
- Genus: Ulotrichopus
- Species: U. recchiai

Binomial name
- Ulotrichopus recchiai Berio, 1978

Synonyms
- Ulotrichopus recchiai f. despoliata Berio, 1978

Species of moth

Ulotrichopus recchiai is a moth of the family Erebidae. It is found in Ethiopia and Kenya.
