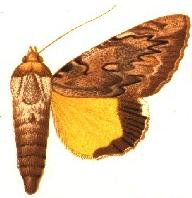

Scientific classification
- Domain: Eukaryota
- Kingdom: Animalia
- Phylum: Arthropoda
- Class: Insecta
- Order: Lepidoptera
- Superfamily: Noctuoidea
- Family: Erebidae
- Genus: Ulotrichopus
- Species: U. dinawa

Binomial name
- Ulotrichopus dinawa (Bethune-Baker, 1906)

Synonyms
- Catocala dinawa Bethune-Baker, 1906; Ulothrichopus dinava; Ulothrichopus dinawa; Ulotrichopus dinava

= Ulotrichopus dinawa =

Species of moth

Ulotrichopus dinawa is a moth of the family Erebidae. It is found in New Guinea.
