= Audea zimmeri =

Scientific classification
- Kingdom: Animalia
- Phylum: Arthropoda
- Class: Insecta
- Order: Lepidoptera
- Superfamily: Noctuoidea
- Family: Erebidae
- Genus: Audea
- Species: A. zimmeri

Binomial name
- Audea zimmeri Berio, 1954

Species of moth

Audea zimmeri is a moth of the family Erebidae. It is found in the Democratic Republic of Congo (North Kivu, Katanga, Orientale), Eswatini, Ethiopia, South Africa, Tanzania, Uganda and Zimbabwe.
