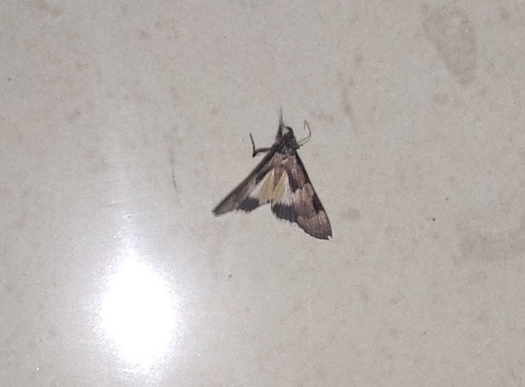

Scientific classification
- Kingdom: Animalia
- Phylum: Arthropoda
- Class: Insecta
- Order: Lepidoptera
- Superfamily: Noctuoidea
- Family: Erebidae
- Subfamily: Erebinae
- Tribe: Audeini
- Genus: Audea
- Species: A. stenophaea

Binomial name
- Audea stenophaea Hampson, 1913

= Audea stenophaea =

Species of moth

Audea stenophaea is a moth of the family Erebidae. It is found in India, where it has been recorded from the Palni Hills and Hyderabad.

== Description ==
The head is black and the abdomen is ochreous white with a lateral series of black spots. The forewing is blackish-brown mixed with some whitish. The hindwing is pure white with a black terminal band.

The underside of forewing is white with a fuscous brown postmedial band. The underside of hindwing has a blackish spot at the middle of costa.

The wingspan is 46 millimeters.
