= Tachiniscinae =

Scientific classification
- Domain: Eukaryota
- Kingdom: Animalia
- Phylum: Arthropoda
- Class: Insecta
- Order: Diptera
- Family: Tephritidae
- Subfamily: Tachiniscinae; Kertész, 1903

Diversity
- 8 genera, 18 species

Subfamily of flies

The Tachiniscinae are a subfamily of the fruit fly family Tephritidae. They are treated by some authorities as a separate family, Tachiniscidae. An undetermined species of the genus Tachiniscidia has been reared from Saturniidae caterpillars in Nigeria.

The family Tachiniscidae was established by Kertész for a single species, Tachinisca cyaneiventris Kertész, 1903 from Peru and Bolivia. Kertész correctly placed that family in the “Muscidae acalyptratae”, in spite of its tachinid-like appearance. In the same year, Bischof described another genus, Bibundia, with a single species, B. hermanni Bischof (from Central Africa), which he assigned to “Ortalidae”. Malloch described one more monotypic tachiniscid genus, Tachiniscidia, with the type species T. africana Malloch from “Chirinda Forest, S. Rhodesia” (Zimbabwe).

The only host data recorded for these three genera, or any other Tachiniscinae, is the mention of “Anthophasia robertsi Cogan” (nomen nudum; listed by Cogan as an undescribed species of Bibundia) reared from pupae of Bunaea alcinoe Stoll and Imbrasia obscura Butler (Lepidoptera: Saturniidae) by Roberts (1969). The exact identity of the host species needs further investigation, as Cogan (1980: 555) stated that “A single specimen of a Bibundia species has been reared by Roberts (1969) from a caterpillar of a saturniid moth, Imbrasia nictitans Fabricius” (=Imbrasia epimethea Drury).

The genera and species currently placed in the tribe Ortalotrypetini were originally assigned to the family Tephritidae, and generally fit its diagnosis well. Hendel (1927) established the genus Ortalotrypeta with two species from China (Sichuan), O. gigas Hendel and O. idana Hendel, which he considered related to Acanthonevra Macquart and allied genera of fruit flies. Later, eight additional species from southeastern China and northern Vietnam. The genus Cyaphorma Wang 1989, very close to Ortalotrypeta, was described from China (Wang, 1989). Ito (1983) established the tribe Ortalotrypetini in his key to genera of Japanese Tephritidae. He included the single genus Ortalotrypeta to separate it from genera of the tribe Acanthonevrini. The tribe was preliminarily revised by Norrbom.

McAlpine (1989) presumed that the Tachiniscidae could be a sister-group of Pyrgotidae based only on their parasitic larval habits.

Korneyev hypothesized that the highly specialized structure of female ovipositor as a synapomorphy of Ortalotrypetini and Tachiniscidae and joined them as a subfamily Tachiniscinae in the family Tephritidae, as the sister group to other tephritid taxa. Korneyev & Norrbom summarized all the taxonomy data on the genera of the tribe. And later, Han & Ro provided the results of phylogeny reconstruction of the family Tephritidae (Diptera) from 12S, 16S, and COII mitochondrial gene fragments, which strongly supported the hypothesis of Tachiniscinae monophyly and sister-group relationships to the remaining group of Tephritidae than to Pyrgotidae.

== Classification ==
- Tribe Ortalotrypetini:

- Cyaforma
- Ischyropteron
- Neortalotrypeta
- Ortalotrypeta
- Protortalotrypeta

- Tribe Tachiniscini:

- Bibundia
- Tachinisca
- Tachiniscidia
