= Ulotrichopus ochreipennis =

Scientific classification
- Domain: Eukaryota
- Kingdom: Animalia
- Phylum: Arthropoda
- Class: Insecta
- Order: Lepidoptera
- Superfamily: Noctuoidea
- Family: Erebidae
- Genus: Ulotrichopus
- Species: U. ochreipennis

Binomial name
- Ulotrichopus ochreipennis (Butler, 1878)

Synonyms
- Audea ochreipennis Butler, 1878

Species of moth

Ulotrichopus ochreipennis is a moth of the family Erebidae. It is found in Madagascar.
