= Bibundia =

Scientific classification
- Kingdom: Animalia
- Phylum: Arthropoda
- Class: Insecta
- Order: Diptera
- Family: Tephritidae
- Subfamily: Tachiniscinae
- Genus: Bibundia

Genus of flies

Bibundia is a genus of Tephritid or fruit flies in the family Tephritidae.
