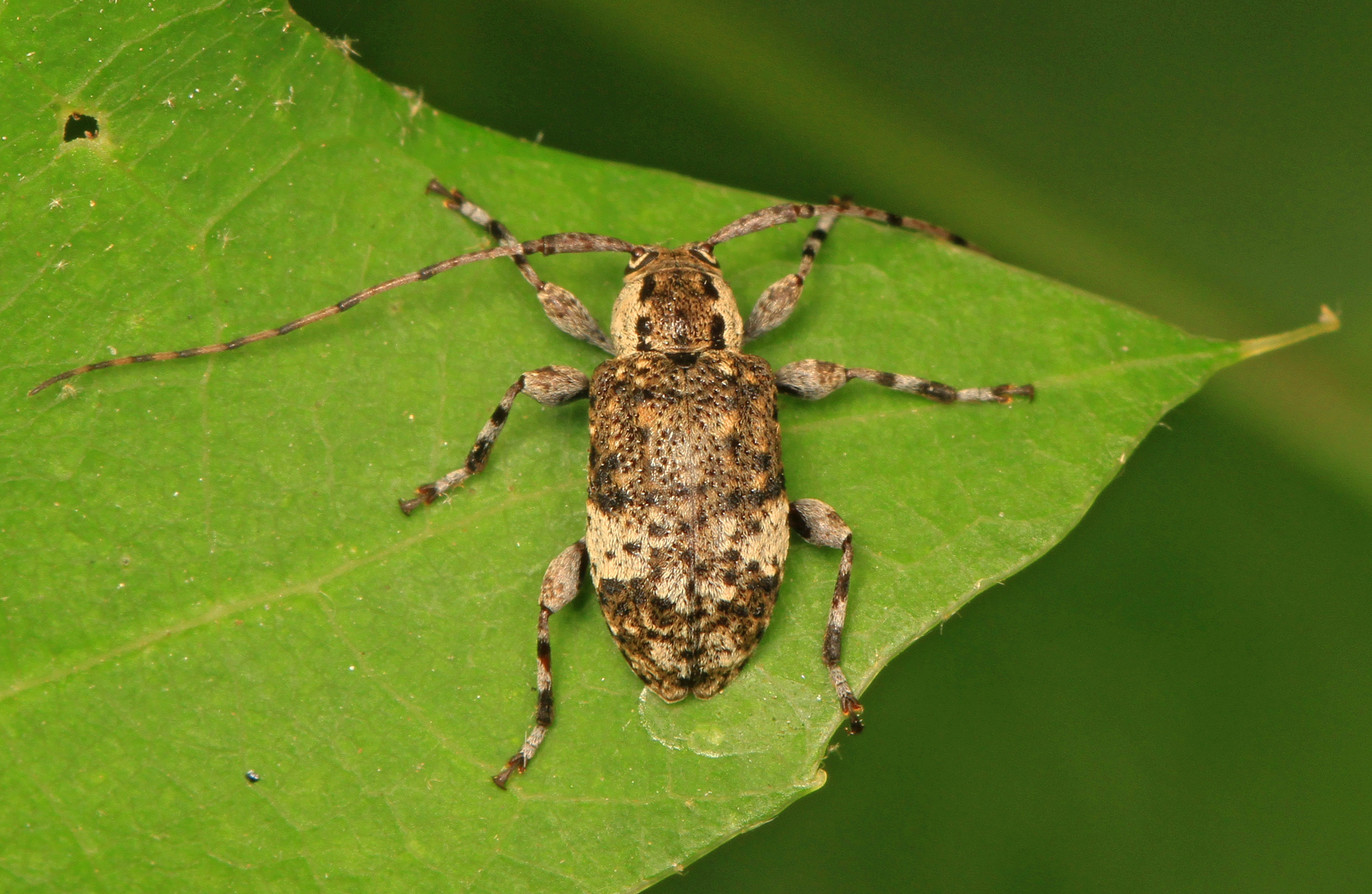
- Astylopsis macula

Scientific classification
- Kingdom: Animalia
- Phylum: Arthropoda
- Class: Insecta
- Order: Coleoptera
- Suborder: Polyphaga
- Infraorder: Cucujiformia
- Family: Cerambycidae
- Subfamily: Lamiinae
- Tribe: Acanthocinini
- Genus: Astylopsis; Casey, 1913

= Astylopsis =

Genus of beetles

Astylopsis is a genus of longhorn beetles of the subfamily Lamiinae. It was described by Casey in 1913.

== Species ==
- Astylopsis arcuata (LeConte, 1878)
- Astylopsis collaris (Haldeman, 1847)
- Astylopsis macula (Say, 1826)
- Astylopsis perplexa (Haldeman, 1847)
- Astylopsis sexguttata (Say, 1826)
