= Audea luteoforma =

Scientific classification
- Kingdom: Animalia
- Phylum: Arthropoda
- Class: Insecta
- Order: Lepidoptera
- Superfamily: Noctuoidea
- Family: Erebidae
- Genus: Audea
- Species: A. luteoforma

Binomial name
- Audea luteoforma Kühne, 2005

Species of moth

Audea luteoforma is a moth of the family Erebidae. It is found in Angola, the Democratic Republic of Congo, Kenya, Malawi, Rwanda, Tanzania, Zambia and Zimbabwe.
