= Ortalotrypeta idanina =

Scientific classification
- Kingdom: Animalia
- Phylum: Arthropoda
- Class: Insecta
- Order: Diptera
- Family: Tephritidae
- Genus: Ortalotrypeta
- Species: O. idanina

Binomial name
- Ortalotrypeta idanina Zia, 1963

Species of fly

Ortalotrypeta idanina is a species of tephritid or fruit flies in the genus Ortalotrypeta of the family Tephritidae.
