= Ulotrichopus nigricans =

Scientific classification
- Domain: Eukaryota
- Kingdom: Animalia
- Phylum: Arthropoda
- Class: Insecta
- Order: Lepidoptera
- Superfamily: Noctuoidea
- Family: Erebidae
- Genus: Ulotrichopus
- Species: U. nigricans

Binomial name
- Ulotrichopus nigricans Laporte, 1973

Species of moth

Ulotrichopus nigricans is a moth of the family Erebidae. It is found in Burundi, Cameroon, the Democratic Republic of Congo (Orientale, North Kivu), Ethiopia, Kenya, Malawi, Rwanda, South Africa and Uganda.
