= Ortalotrypeta gigas =

Scientific classification
- Kingdom: Animalia
- Phylum: Arthropoda
- Class: Insecta
- Order: Diptera
- Family: Tephritidae
- Genus: Ortalotrypeta
- Species: O. gigas

Binomial name
- Ortalotrypeta gigas Hendel, 1927

Species of fly

Ortalotrypeta gigas is a species of tephritid or fruit flies in the genus Ortalotrypeta of the family Tephritidae.
