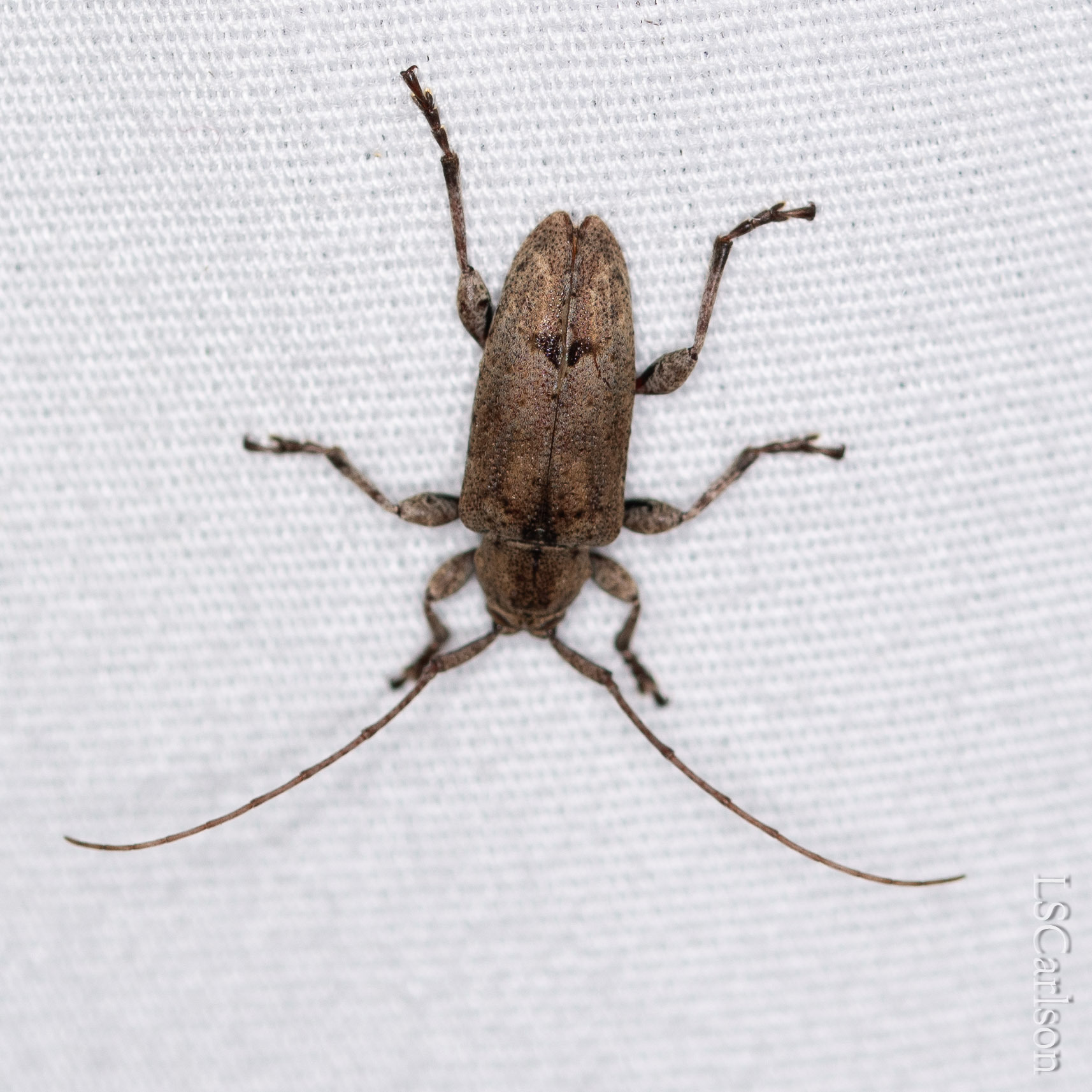

Scientific classification
- Kingdom: Animalia
- Phylum: Arthropoda
- Class: Insecta
- Order: Coleoptera
- Suborder: Polyphaga
- Infraorder: Cucujiformia
- Family: Cerambycidae
- Genus: Astylopsis
- Species: A. perplexa

Binomial name
- Astylopsis perplexa (Haldeman, 1847)

= Astylopsis perplexa =

Species of beetle

Astylopsis perplexa is a species of longhorn beetles of the subfamily Lamiinae. It was described by Haldeman in 1847.
