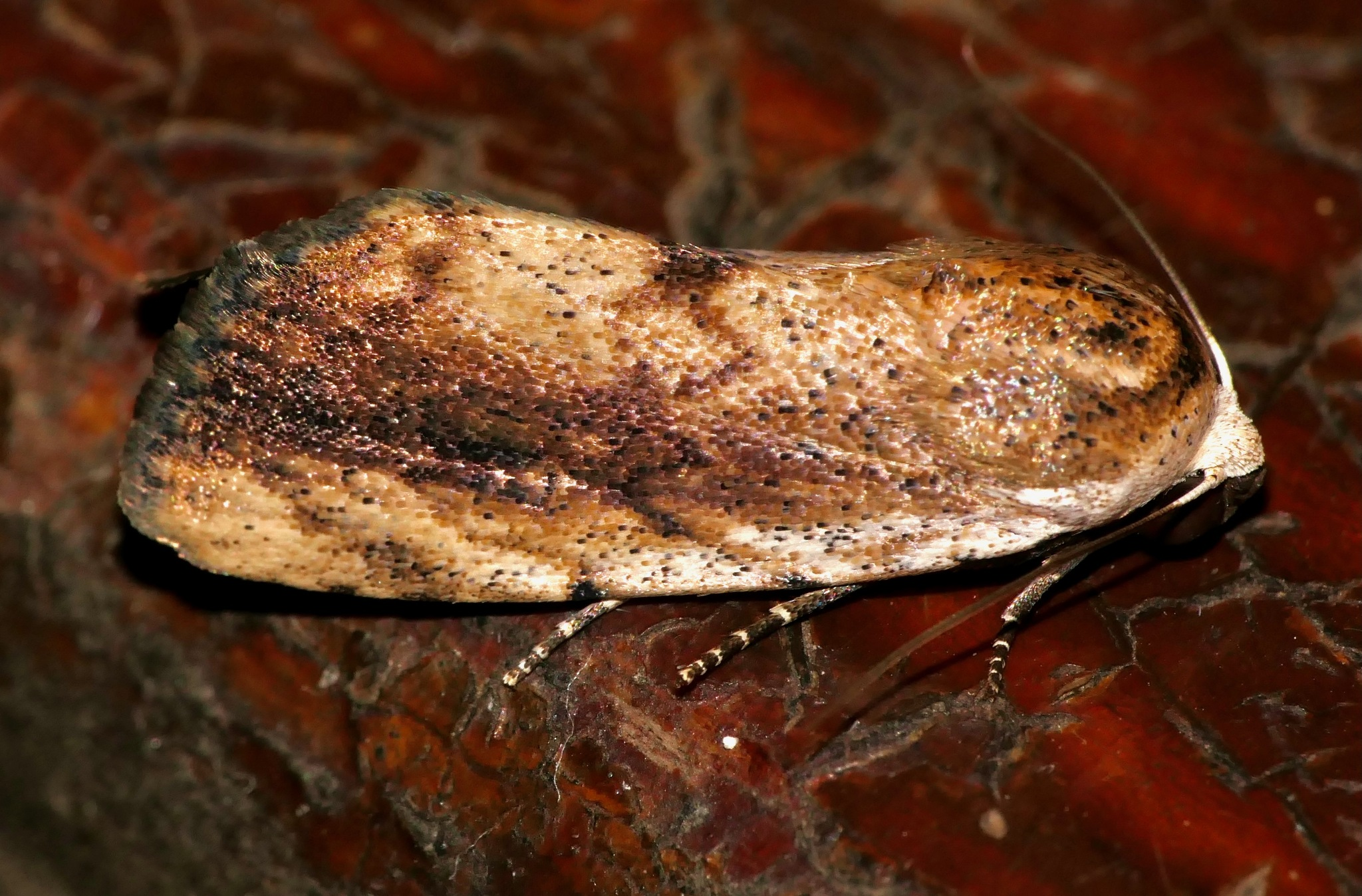
- Tachosa brunnescens, South Africa

Scientific classification
- Kingdom: Animalia
- Phylum: Arthropoda
- Class: Insecta
- Order: Lepidoptera
- Superfamily: Noctuoidea
- Family: Erebidae
- Genus: Tachosa
- Species: T. brunnescens

Binomial name
- Tachosa brunnescens (Pinhey, 1968)

= Tachosa brunnescens =

Species of moth

Tachosa brunnescens is a species of owlet moth in the family Erebidae, found in Africa.
