= Ulotrichopus eugeniae =

Scientific classification
- Kingdom: Animalia
- Phylum: Arthropoda
- Clade: Pancrustacea
- Class: Insecta
- Order: Lepidoptera
- Superfamily: Noctuoidea
- Family: Erebidae
- Genus: Ulotrichopus
- Species: U. eugeniae

Binomial name
- Ulotrichopus eugeniae Saldaitis & Ivinskis, 2010

Species of moth

Ulotrichopus eugeniae is a moth of the family Erebidae. It is found in Kenya and Tanzania.
