= Audea blochwitzi =

Scientific classification
- Kingdom: Animalia
- Phylum: Arthropoda
- Class: Insecta
- Order: Lepidoptera
- Superfamily: Noctuoidea
- Family: Erebidae
- Genus: Audea
- Species: A. blochwitzi

Binomial name
- Audea blochwitzi Kühne, 2005

Species of moth

Audea blochwitzi is a moth of the family Erebidae. It is found in the Democratic Republic of Congo (Katanga), Ethiopia, Malawi, South Africa, Tanzania, Zambia and Zimbabwe.
