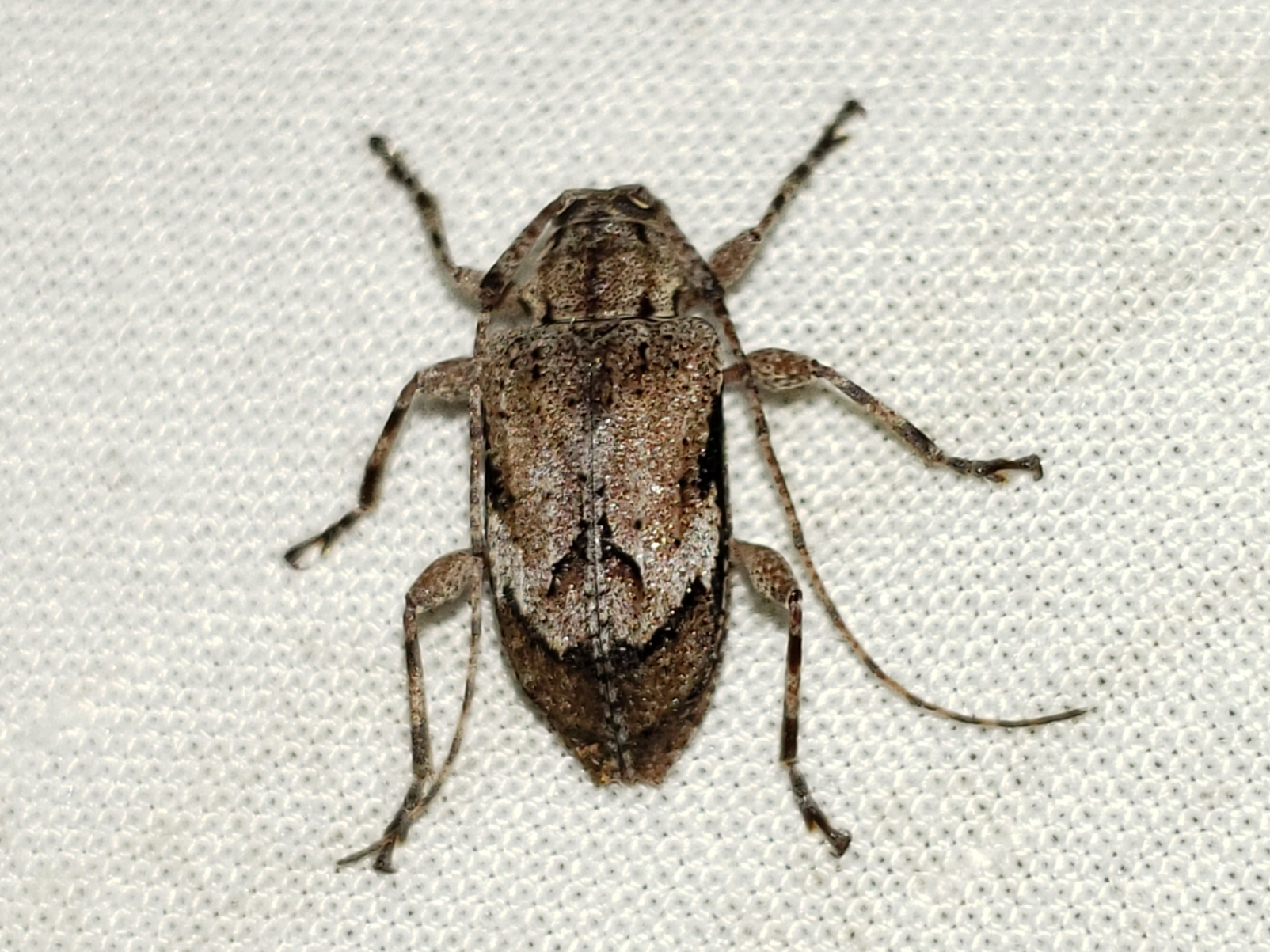

Scientific classification
- Kingdom: Animalia
- Phylum: Arthropoda
- Class: Insecta
- Order: Coleoptera
- Suborder: Polyphaga
- Infraorder: Cucujiformia
- Family: Cerambycidae
- Genus: Astylopsis
- Species: A. arcuata

Binomial name
- Astylopsis arcuata (LeConte, 1878)

= Astylopsis arcuata =

Species of beetle

Astylopsis arcuata is a species of longhorn beetle of the subfamily Lamiinae. It was described by John Lawrence LeConte in 1878.
