= Tachosa aspera =

Scientific classification
- Kingdom: Animalia
- Phylum: Arthropoda
- Clade: Pancrustacea
- Class: Insecta
- Order: Lepidoptera
- Superfamily: Noctuoidea
- Family: Erebidae
- Genus: Tachosa
- Species: T. aspera

Binomial name
- Tachosa aspera Kühne, 2004

Species of moth

Tachosa aspera is a moth of the family Erebidae. It is found in Angola, Ethiopia, Namibia, Nigeria, Rwanda, Tanzania and Uganda.
