= Ortalotrypeta trypetoides =

Scientific classification
- Kingdom: Animalia
- Phylum: Arthropoda
- Clade: Pancrustacea
- Class: Insecta
- Order: Diptera
- Family: Tephritidae
- Genus: Ortalotrypeta
- Species: O. trypetoides

Binomial name
- Ortalotrypeta trypetoides Chen, 1948

Species of fly

Ortalotrypeta trypetoides is a species of tephritid or fruit flies in the genus Ortalotrypeta of the family Tephritidae.
