= Tachinisca =

Scientific classification
- Domain: Eukaryota
- Kingdom: Animalia
- Phylum: Arthropoda
- Class: Insecta
- Order: Diptera
- Family: Tephritidae
- Subfamily: Tachiniscinae
- Genus: Tachinisca

Type species
- Tachinisca cyaneiventris Kertész, 1903

Genus of flies

Tachinisca is a genus of Tephritid or fruit flies in the family Tephritidae.
