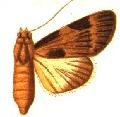
- Female
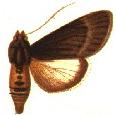
- Male

Scientific classification
- Kingdom: Animalia
- Phylum: Arthropoda
- Class: Insecta
- Order: Lepidoptera
- Superfamily: Noctuoidea
- Family: Erebidae
- Genus: Audea
- Species: A. subligata

Binomial name
- Audea subligata Distant, 1902

= Audea subligata =

Species of moth

Audea subligata is a species of moth in the family Erebidae first described by William Lucas Distant in 1902. It is found in Botswana, South Africa (Mpumalanga) and Tanzania.
