= Ischyropteron =

Scientific classification
- Kingdom: Animalia
- Phylum: Arthropoda
- Class: Insecta
- Order: Diptera
- Family: Tephritidae
- Subfamily: Tachiniscinae
- Tribe: Ortalotrypetini
- Genus: Ischyropteron; Bigot, 1889

Genus of flies

Ischyropteron is a genus of tephritid or fruit flies in the family Tephritidae.
