= Audea melanoplaga =

Scientific classification
- Kingdom: Animalia
- Phylum: Arthropoda
- Class: Insecta
- Order: Lepidoptera
- Superfamily: Noctuoidea
- Family: Erebidae
- Genus: Audea
- Species: A. melanoplaga

Binomial name
- Audea melanoplaga Hampson, 1902

Synonyms
- Audea antennalis Berio, 1954

Species of moth

Audea melanoplaga is a moth of the family Erebidae. It is found in Botswana, Ethiopia, Kenya, Mozambique, Namibia, Somalia, South Africa, Tanzania and Zimbabwe.
