= Ulotrichopus marmoratus =

Scientific classification
- Kingdom: Animalia
- Phylum: Arthropoda
- Class: Insecta
- Order: Lepidoptera
- Superfamily: Noctuoidea
- Family: Erebidae
- Genus: Ulotrichopus
- Species: U. marmoratus

Binomial name
- Ulotrichopus marmoratus Griveaud & Viette, 1962

Species of moth

Ulotrichopus marmoratus is a moth of the family Erebidae. It is found in Madagascar.
