= Audea kathrina =

Scientific classification
- Kingdom: Animalia
- Phylum: Arthropoda
- Class: Insecta
- Order: Lepidoptera
- Superfamily: Noctuoidea
- Family: Erebidae
- Genus: Audea
- Species: A. kathrina

Binomial name
- Audea kathrina Kühne, 2005

Species of moth

Audea kathrina is a moth of the family Erebidae. It is found in the Democratic Republic of Congo, Ghana, Ivory Coast, Mali, Mauritania, Nigeria and Uganda.
