= Ulotrichopus usambarae =

Scientific classification
- Domain: Eukaryota
- Kingdom: Animalia
- Phylum: Arthropoda
- Class: Insecta
- Order: Lepidoptera
- Superfamily: Noctuoidea
- Family: Erebidae
- Genus: Ulotrichopus
- Species: U. usambarae

Binomial name
- Ulotrichopus usambarae Kühne, 2005

Species of moth

Ulotrichopus usambarae is a moth of the family Erebidae. It is found in Tanzania.
