= Ulotrichopus variegata =

Scientific classification
- Kingdom: Animalia
- Phylum: Arthropoda
- Class: Insecta
- Order: Lepidoptera
- Superfamily: Noctuoidea
- Family: Erebidae
- Genus: Ulotrichopus
- Species: U. variegata

Binomial name
- Ulotrichopus variegata (Hampson, 1902)

Synonyms
- Audea variegata Hampson, 1902

Species of moth

Ulotrichopus variegata is a moth of the family Erebidae. It is found in Kenya, Malawi, Mozambique, South Africa (KwaZulu-Natal) and Tanzania.
