= Ortalotrypeta =

Scientific classification
- Domain: Eukaryota
- Kingdom: Animalia
- Phylum: Arthropoda
- Class: Insecta
- Order: Diptera
- Family: Tephritidae
- Subfamily: Tachiniscinae
- Tribe: Ortalotrypetini
- Genus: Ortalotrypeta; Hendel, 1927

Genus of flies

Ortalotrypeta is a genus of tephritid or fruit flies in the family Tephritidae.

== Species ==
The following species are included in the genus.

- Ortalotrypeta gansuica
- Ortalotrypeta gigas
- Ortalotrypeta idana
- Ortalotrypeta idanina
- Ortalotrypeta isshikii
- Ortalotrypeta macula
- Ortalotrypeta singula
- Ortalotrypeta tibeta
- Ortalotrypeta tonkinensis
- Ortalotrypeta trypetoides
- Ortalotrypeta ziae
