= Audea irioleuca =

Scientific classification
- Kingdom: Animalia
- Phylum: Arthropoda
- Class: Insecta
- Order: Lepidoptera
- Superfamily: Noctuoidea
- Family: Erebidae
- Genus: Audea
- Species: A. irioleuca

Binomial name
- Audea irioleuca (Meyrick, 1897)

Synonyms
- Thyas irioleuca Meyrick, 1897

Species of moth

Audea irioleuca is a moth of the family Erebidae. It is found in Australia, where it has been recorded from Queensland and the Northern Territory.
