= Audea melanoptera =

Scientific classification
- Kingdom: Animalia
- Phylum: Arthropoda
- Class: Insecta
- Order: Lepidoptera
- Superfamily: Noctuoidea
- Family: Erebidae
- Genus: Audea
- Species: A. melanoptera

Binomial name
- Audea melanoptera (Berio, 1985)

Synonyms
- Davea melanoptera Berio, 1985

Species of moth

Audea melanoptera is a moth of the family Erebidae. It is found in Somalia.
