= Tachiniscidia =

Scientific classification
- Kingdom: Animalia
- Phylum: Arthropoda
- Clade: Pancrustacea
- Class: Insecta
- Order: Diptera
- Family: Tephritidae
- Subfamily: Tachiniscinae
- Genus: Tachiniscidia

Type species
- Tachiniscidia africana Malloch, 1931

Genus of flies

Tachiniscidia is a genus of Tephritid or fruit flies in the family Tephritidae. Several species appear like wasps.
