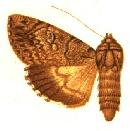

Scientific classification
- Kingdom: Animalia
- Phylum: Arthropoda
- Class: Insecta
- Order: Lepidoptera
- Superfamily: Noctuoidea
- Family: Erebidae
- Genus: Ulotrichopus
- Species: U. phaeopera

Binomial name
- Ulotrichopus phaeopera Hampson, 1913

Synonyms
- Ulothrichopus phaeopera

= Ulotrichopus phaeopera =

Species of moth

Ulotrichopus phaeopera is a moth of the family Erebidae. It is found in Kenya and Uganda.
