= Tachosa sagittalis =

Scientific classification
- Kingdom: Animalia
- Phylum: Arthropoda
- Clade: Pancrustacea
- Class: Insecta
- Order: Lepidoptera
- Superfamily: Noctuoidea
- Family: Erebidae
- Genus: Tachosa
- Species: T. sagittalis

Binomial name
- Tachosa sagittalis (Strand, 1912)

Synonyms
- Metoposcopa sagittalis Strand, 1912; Lophotidia trisema Hampson, 1913

Species of moth

Tachosa sagittalis is a moth of the family Erebidae. It is found in Ethiopia, Kenya, Sudan, Tanzania and Uganda.
