= Audea tachosoides =

Scientific classification
- Kingdom: Animalia
- Phylum: Arthropoda
- Class: Insecta
- Order: Lepidoptera
- Superfamily: Noctuoidea
- Family: Erebidae
- Genus: Audea
- Species: A. tachosoides

Binomial name
- Audea tachosoides Kühne, 2005

Species of moth

Audea tachosoides is a moth of the family Erebidae first described by Lars Kühne in 2005. It is found in the West African countries of Burkina Faso and Ivory Coast.
