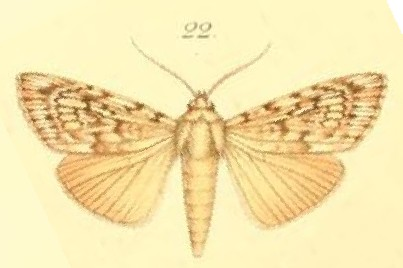

Scientific classification
- Kingdom: Animalia
- Phylum: Arthropoda
- Clade: Pancrustacea
- Class: Insecta
- Order: Lepidoptera
- Superfamily: Noctuoidea
- Family: Erebidae
- Genus: Tachosa
- Species: T. acronyctoides

Binomial name
- Tachosa acronyctoides Walker, 1869

Synonyms
- Tachosa malagasy Viette, 1966; Anabathra una Möschler, 1887; Tachosa acronyctoides ab. albicans Berio, 1954

= Tachosa acronyctoides =

Species of moth

Tachosa acronyctoides is a moth of the family Erebidae.

== Distribution ==
It is found in most countries of Africa, from Guinea and Ethiopia south until South Africa.
