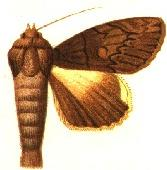

Scientific classification
- Kingdom: Animalia
- Phylum: Arthropoda
- Class: Insecta
- Order: Lepidoptera
- Superfamily: Noctuoidea
- Family: Erebidae
- Genus: Ulotrichopus
- Species: U. mesoleuca

Binomial name
- Ulotrichopus mesoleuca (Walker, 1858)

Synonyms
- Audea mesoleuca Walker, 1858; Ulothrichopus mesoleuca; Ulotrichopus mesoleucus; Ulotrichopus tortuosus Wallengren, 1860

= Ulotrichopus mesoleuca =

Species of moth

Ulotrichopus mesoleuca is a moth of the family Erebidae. It is found in South Africa, where it has been recorded from KwaZulu-Natal and Western Cape.
