= Audea vadoni =

Scientific classification
- Kingdom: Animalia
- Phylum: Arthropoda
- Class: Insecta
- Order: Lepidoptera
- Superfamily: Noctuoidea
- Family: Erebidae
- Genus: Audea
- Species: A. vadoni

Binomial name
- Audea vadoni (Viette, 1966)

Synonyms
- Davea vadoni Viette, 1966

Species of moth

Audea vadoni is a moth of the family Erebidae. It is found in Madagascar.
