= Audea nigrior =

Scientific classification
- Kingdom: Animalia
- Phylum: Arthropoda
- Class: Insecta
- Order: Lepidoptera
- Superfamily: Noctuoidea
- Family: Erebidae
- Genus: Audea
- Species: A. nigrior

Binomial name
- Audea nigrior Kühne, 2005

Species of moth

Audea nigrior is a moth of the family Erebidae. It is found in the Democratic Republic of the Congo (Orientale, Bas Congo), Rwanda, South Africa, Eswatini and Tanzania.
