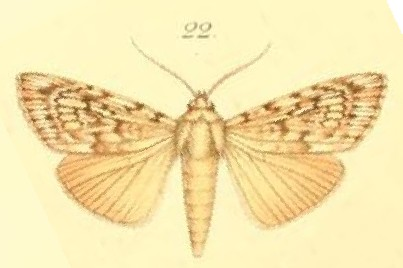
- Tachosa acronyctoides

Scientific classification
- Kingdom: Animalia
- Phylum: Arthropoda
- Class: Insecta
- Order: Lepidoptera
- Superfamily: Noctuoidea
- Family: Erebidae
- Tribe: Catocalini
- Genus: Tachosa; Walker, 1869

Synonyms
- Anabathra Möschler, 1887; Metoposcopa Strand, 1912; Lophotidia Hampson, 1913

= Tachosa =

Genus of moths

Tachosa is a genus of moths of the family Erebidae. The species of this genus are found in Africa.

== Species ==
- Tachosa acronyctoides Walker, 1869
- Tachosa aspera Kühne, 2004
- Tachosa brunnescens (Pinhey, 1968)
- Tachosa fumata (Wallengren, 1860)
- Tachosa guichardi (Wiltshire, 1982)
- Tachosa sagittalis (Strand, 1912)
