= Audea albiforma =

Scientific classification
- Kingdom: Animalia
- Phylum: Arthropoda
- Class: Insecta
- Order: Lepidoptera
- Superfamily: Noctuoidea
- Family: Erebidae
- Genus: Audea
- Species: A. albiforma

Binomial name
- Audea albiforma Kühne, 2005

Species of moth

Audea albiforma is a moth of the family Erebidae. It is found in Mali and Nigeria.
