= Ulotrichopus rama =

Scientific classification
- Kingdom: Animalia
- Phylum: Arthropoda
- Class: Insecta
- Order: Lepidoptera
- Superfamily: Noctuoidea
- Family: Erebidae
- Genus: Ulotrichopus
- Species: U. rama

Binomial name
- Ulotrichopus rama (Moore, 1885)

Synonyms
- Catocala rama Moore, 1885

Species of moth

Ulotrichopus rama is a moth of the family Erebidae first described by Frederic Moore in 1885. It is found on Sumatra, Flores and Sri Lanka.

== Description ==
The wingspan is about 66–72 mm. Mid tibia of the male has a tuft of long hair arising from the base. Head and collar reddish, whereas thorax and abdomen greyish. Forewings grey with black irrorated. A short sub-basal line, an oblique antemedial waved black line can be seen. Reniform spot indistinct and pale with a fuscous patch on the costa above it. The postmedial line extremely irregularly dentate and highly angled beyond the cell. Hindwings are yellow with a curved medial black band which not reaching costa or inner margin. The outer are black with irregular inner edge and pale patched at apex and anal angle. Ventral side with a dark band and outer area of both wings are dark.
