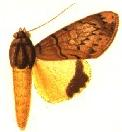

Scientific classification
- Domain: Eukaryota
- Kingdom: Animalia
- Phylum: Arthropoda
- Class: Insecta
- Order: Lepidoptera
- Superfamily: Noctuoidea
- Family: Erebidae
- Genus: Ulotrichopus
- Species: U. trisa

Binomial name
- Ulotrichopus trisa (C. Swinhoe, 1899)

Synonyms
- Catocala trisa C. Swinhoe, 1899; Ulothrichopus trisa

= Ulotrichopus trisa =

Species of moth

Ulotrichopus trisa is a moth of the family Erebidae first described by Charles Swinhoe in 1899. It is found in India.
