= Ortalotrypeta isshikii =

Scientific classification
- Kingdom: Animalia
- Phylum: Arthropoda
- Clade: Pancrustacea
- Class: Insecta
- Order: Diptera
- Family: Tephritidae
- Genus: Ortalotrypeta
- Species: O. isshikii

Binomial name
- Ortalotrypeta isshikii (Matsumura, 1916)

Species of fly

Ortalotrypeta isshikii is a species of tephritid or fruit fly in the genus Ortalotrypeta of the family Tephritidae.
