= Ulotrichopus catocala =

Scientific classification
- Domain: Eukaryota
- Kingdom: Animalia
- Phylum: Arthropoda
- Class: Insecta
- Order: Lepidoptera
- Superfamily: Noctuoidea
- Family: Erebidae
- Genus: Ulotrichopus
- Species: U. catocala

Binomial name
- Ulotrichopus catocala (Felder & Rogenhofer, 1874)

Synonyms
- Phoberia catocala Felder & Rogenhofer, 1874; Alura caupona Möschler, 1883

Species of moth

Ulotrichopus catocala is a moth of the family Erebidae. It is found in South Africa, where it has been recorded from the Eastern Cape and KwaZulu-Natal.
