= Ulotrichopus sumatrensis =

Scientific classification
- Kingdom: Animalia
- Phylum: Arthropoda
- Clade: Pancrustacea
- Class: Insecta
- Order: Lepidoptera
- Superfamily: Noctuoidea
- Family: Erebidae
- Genus: Ulotrichopus
- Species: U. sumatrensis

Binomial name
- Ulotrichopus sumatrensis Prout, 1928

Species of moth

Ulotrichopus sumatrensis is a moth of the family Erebidae. It is found on Sumatra.
