= Ortalotrypeta ziae =

Scientific classification
- Kingdom: Animalia
- Phylum: Arthropoda
- Class: Insecta
- Order: Diptera
- Family: Tephritidae
- Genus: Ortalotrypeta
- Species: O. ziae

Binomial name
- Ortalotrypeta ziae Norrbom, 1994

Species of fly

Ortalotrypeta ziae is a species of tephritid or fruit flies in the genus Ortalotrypeta of the family Tephritidae.
