= Protortalotrypeta =

Scientific classification
- Kingdom: Animalia
- Phylum: Arthropoda
- Class: Insecta
- Order: Diptera
- Family: Tephritidae
- Subfamily: Tachiniscinae
- Genus: Protortalotrypeta

Genus of flies

Protortalotrypeta is a monotypic genus of tephritid or fruit flies in the family Tephritidae. It contains the species Protortalotrypeta grimaldii.
