= Ulotrichopus pseudomarmoratus =

Scientific classification
- Domain: Eukaryota
- Kingdom: Animalia
- Phylum: Arthropoda
- Class: Insecta
- Order: Lepidoptera
- Superfamily: Noctuoidea
- Family: Erebidae
- Genus: Ulotrichopus
- Species: U. pseudomarmoratus

Binomial name
- Ulotrichopus pseudomarmoratus Kühne, 2005

Species of moth

Ulotrichopus pseudomarmoratus is a moth of the family Erebidae. It is found in Cameroon, Equatorial Guinea, Kenya, Rwanda and Uganda.
