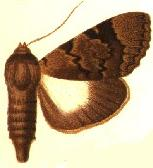
- Female
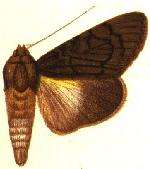
- Male

Scientific classification
- Kingdom: Animalia
- Phylum: Arthropoda
- Class: Insecta
- Order: Lepidoptera
- Superfamily: Noctuoidea
- Family: Erebidae
- Genus: Audea
- Species: A. hemihyala

Binomial name
- Audea hemihyala Karsch, 1896

Synonyms
- Audea endophaea Hampson, 1913

= Audea hemihyala =

Species of moth

Audea hemihyala is a species of moth in the family Erebidae first described by Ferdinand Karsch in 1896. It is found in Angola, Burkina Faso, Burundi, Cameroon, the Central African Republic, the Democratic Republic of the Congo (Orientale, Kinshasa, East Kasai), Ethiopia, Gabon, Ghana, Guinea, Ivory Coast, Kenya, Nigeria, Rwanda, Sierra Leone, Togo and Uganda.

The larvae have been recorded feeding on Bridelia species.
