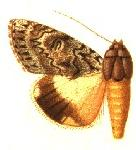

Scientific classification
- Domain: Eukaryota
- Kingdom: Animalia
- Phylum: Arthropoda
- Class: Insecta
- Order: Lepidoptera
- Superfamily: Noctuoidea
- Family: Erebidae
- Genus: Ulotrichopus
- Species: U. stertzi

Binomial name
- Ulotrichopus stertzi (Püngeler, 1907)

Synonyms
- Audea stertzi Püngeler, 1907; Ulothrichopus leucopasta Hampson, 1913; Ulothrichopus glaucescens Hampson, 1913

= Ulotrichopus stertzi =

Species of moth

Ulotrichopus stertzi is a moth of the family Erebidae. It is found in the Democratic Republic of Congo (Orientale), Nigeria, Oman, Rwanda, South Africa (Mpumalanga, KwaZulu-Natal), Sudan, Uganda, Yemen, Zimbabwe, Israel and Palestina.
