= Audea delphinensis =

Scientific classification
- Kingdom: Animalia
- Phylum: Arthropoda
- Class: Insecta
- Order: Lepidoptera
- Superfamily: Noctuoidea
- Family: Erebidae
- Genus: Audea
- Species: A. delphinensis

Binomial name
- Audea delphinensis (Viette, 1966)

Synonyms
- Davea delphinensis Viette, 1966

Species of moth

Audea delphinensis is a moth of the family Erebidae. It is found in Madagascar.
