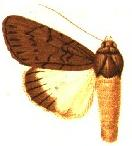

Scientific classification
- Kingdom: Animalia
- Phylum: Arthropoda
- Class: Insecta
- Order: Lepidoptera
- Superfamily: Noctuoidea
- Family: Erebidae
- Genus: Ulotrichopus
- Species: U. phaeoleucus

Binomial name
- Ulotrichopus phaeoleucus Hampson, 1913

Synonyms
- Ulotrichopa phaeoleucus; Ulothrichopus phaeoleuca; Ulotrichopa phaeoleuca

= Ulotrichopus phaeoleucus =

Species of moth

Ulotrichopus phaeoleucus is a moth of the family Erebidae. It is found in Burundi, the Democratic Republic of Congo (Orientale), Ethiopia, Kenya, Malawi, Tanzania, Uganda and Yemen.

== Subspecies ==
- Ulotrichopus phaeoleucus phaeoleucus
- Ulotrichopus phaeoleucus griseus Kühne, 2005 (Ethiopia, Yemen)
