= Audea jonasi =

Scientific classification
- Kingdom: Animalia
- Phylum: Arthropoda
- Class: Insecta
- Order: Lepidoptera
- Superfamily: Noctuoidea
- Family: Erebidae
- Genus: Audea
- Species: A. jonasi

Binomial name
- Audea jonasi Kühne, 2005

Species of moth

Audea jonasi is a moth of the family Erebidae. It is found in Madagascar.
