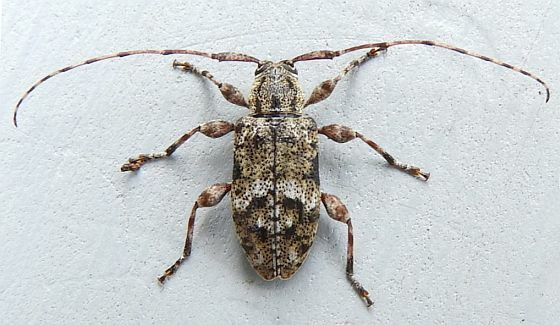

Scientific classification
- Kingdom: Animalia
- Phylum: Arthropoda
- Class: Insecta
- Order: Coleoptera
- Suborder: Polyphaga
- Infraorder: Cucujiformia
- Family: Cerambycidae
- Genus: Astylopsis
- Species: A. collaris

Binomial name
- Astylopsis collaris (Haldeman, 1847)

= Astylopsis collaris =

Species of beetle

Astylopsis collaris is a species of longhorn beetles of the subfamily Lamiinae. It was described by Haldeman in 1847.
