= Audea paulumnodosa =

Scientific classification
- Kingdom: Animalia
- Phylum: Arthropoda
- Class: Insecta
- Order: Lepidoptera
- Superfamily: Noctuoidea
- Family: Erebidae
- Genus: Audea
- Species: A. paulumnodosa

Binomial name
- Audea paulumnodosa Kühne, 2005

Species of moth

Audea paulumnodosa is a moth of the family Erebidae first described by Lars Kühne in 2005. It is found in Burkina Faso, Cameroon, Ethiopia, Ghana, Ivory Coast, Mauritania, Nigeria, Senegal, Sudan, the Gambia and Uganda.
