= Gibberula ubitaensis =

Scientific classification
- Kingdom: Animalia
- Phylum: Mollusca
- Class: Gastropoda
- Subclass: Caenogastropoda
- Order: Neogastropoda
- Family: Cystiscidae
- Subfamily: Cystiscinae
- Genus: Gibberula
- Species: G. ubitaensis

Binomial name
- Gibberula ubitaensis Espinosa & Ortea, 2000

Species of gastropod

Gibberula ubitaensis is a species of very small sea snail, a marine gastropod mollusk or micromollusk in the family Cystiscidae.

== Description ==
As a non-broadcast spawner, Gibberula ubitaensis employs benthic egg deposition, a reproductive strategy common in Cystiscidae. Life cycle does not include trocophore stage. This mode of reproduction, where eggs are attached to or embedded within submerged substrates, contrasts with broadcast spawning by prioritizing localized survival over broad dispersal.

== Distribution ==
The type locality of Gibberula ubitaensis is situated in the Costa Rican part of the Caribbean Sea, establishing its primary biogeographic association with the Western Atlantic tropical marine province. The habitat preferences align with those typical of other Gibberula species, which are generally found in association with various marine substrates including seagrass beds, coral reefs, and soft sediment environments.
