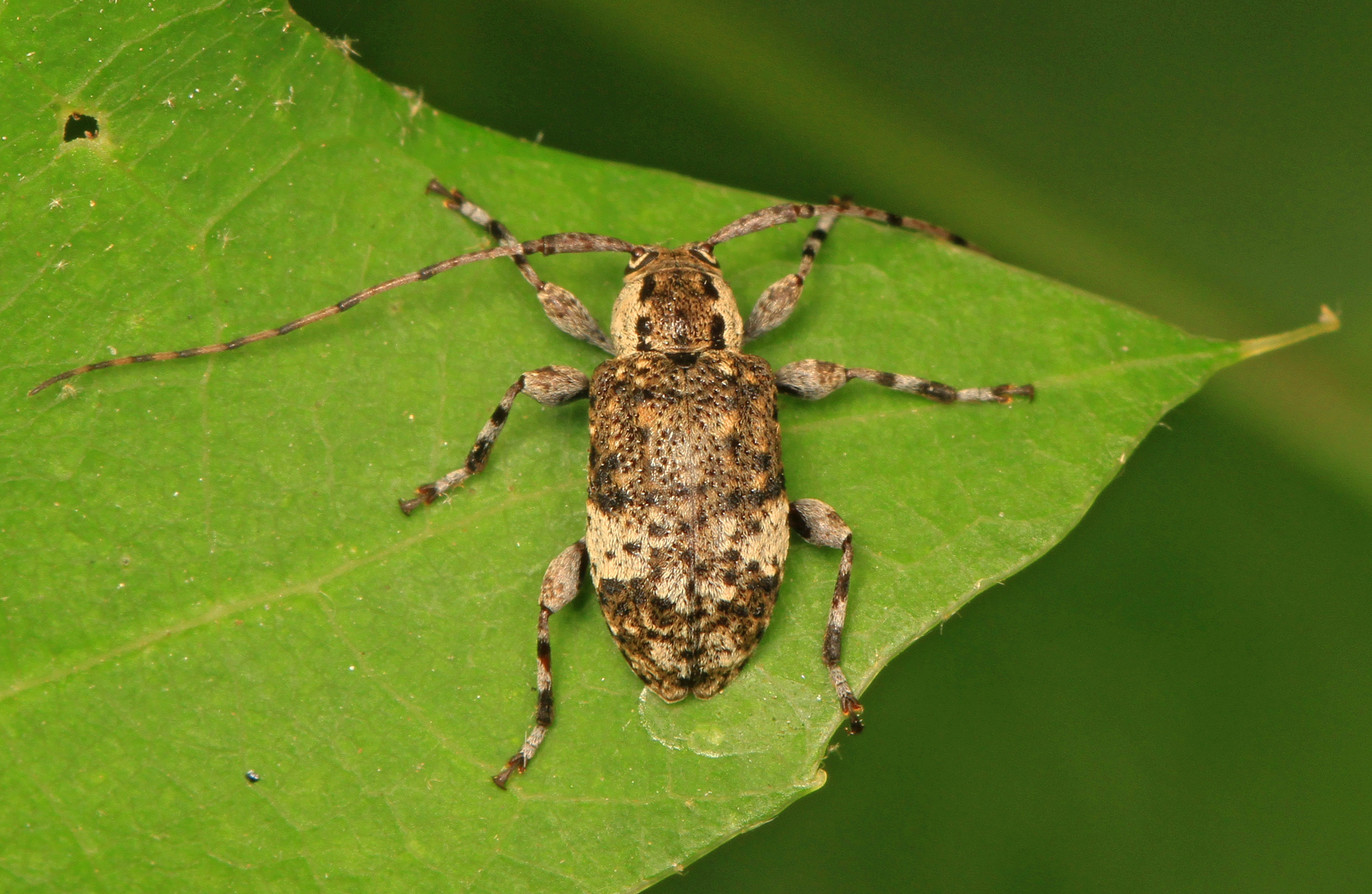

Scientific classification
- Kingdom: Animalia
- Phylum: Arthropoda
- Class: Insecta
- Order: Coleoptera
- Suborder: Polyphaga
- Infraorder: Cucujiformia
- Family: Cerambycidae
- Genus: Astylopsis
- Species: A. macula

Binomial name
- Astylopsis macula (Say, 1826)

= Astylopsis macula =

Species of beetle

Astylopsis macula is a species of longhorn beetles of the subfamily Lamiinae. It was described by Say in 1826.
