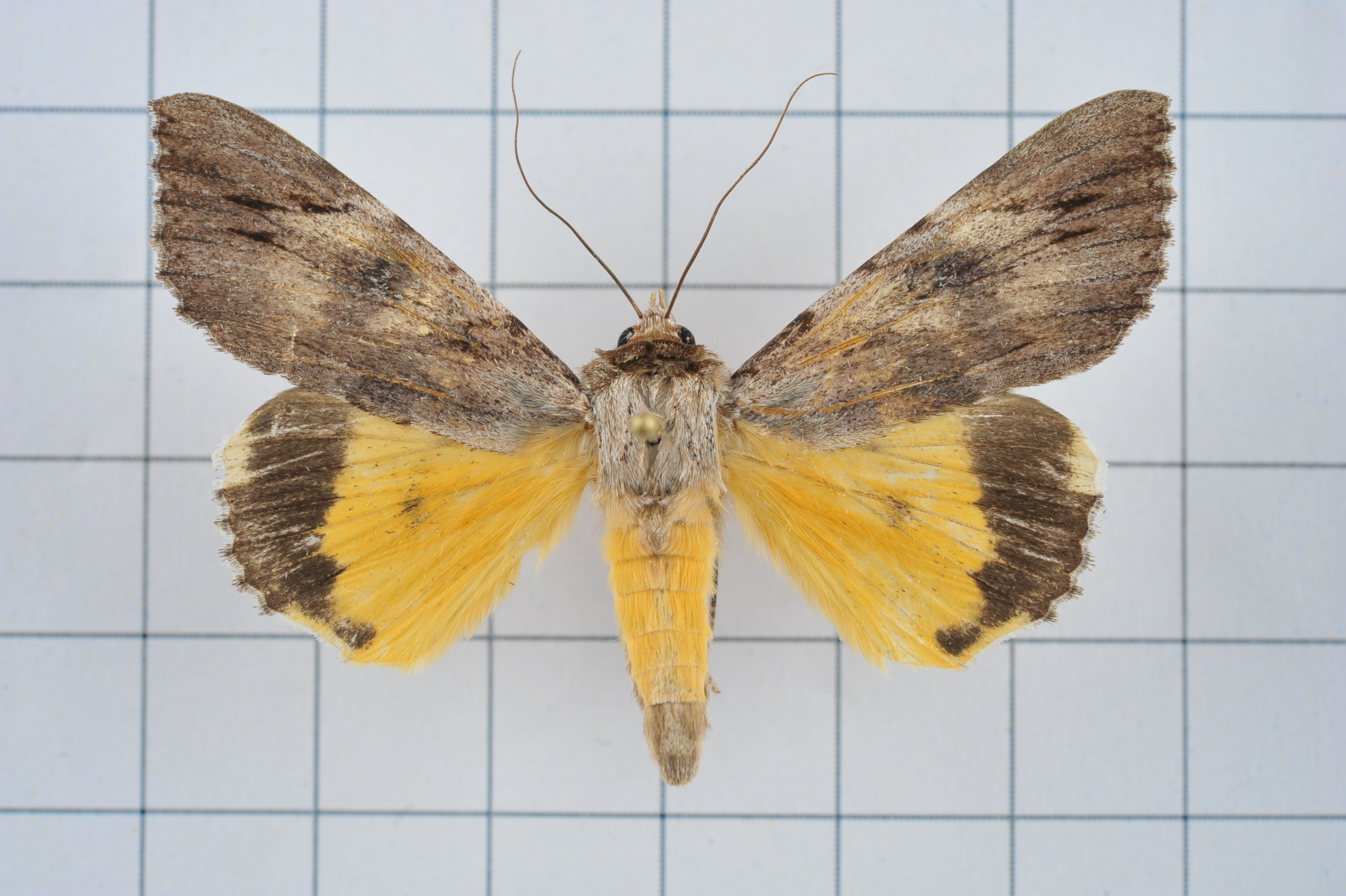

Scientific classification
- Kingdom: Animalia
- Phylum: Arthropoda
- Class: Insecta
- Order: Lepidoptera
- Superfamily: Noctuoidea
- Family: Erebidae
- Genus: Ulotrichopus
- Species: U. macula

Binomial name
- Ulotrichopus macula (Hampson, 1891)

Synonyms
- Audea macula Hampson, 1891; Catocala macula; Ulothrichopus macula reducta Prout, 1922; Ulotrichopus macula Hampson, 1891

= Ulotrichopus macula =

Species of moth

Ulotrichopus macula is a moth of the family Erebidae. It is found in the Indian Subregion, Taiwan, Thailand, Sundaland, Sulawesi and Seram.

== Subspecies ==
- Ulotrichopus macula macula
- Ulotrichopus macula reducta Prout, 1922 (Sulawesi and Seram)
