= Ulotrichopus fatilega =

Scientific classification
- Domain: Eukaryota
- Kingdom: Animalia
- Phylum: Arthropoda
- Class: Insecta
- Order: Lepidoptera
- Superfamily: Noctuoidea
- Family: Erebidae
- Genus: Ulotrichopus
- Species: U. fatilega

Binomial name
- Ulotrichopus fatilega (Felder & Rogenhofer, 1874)

Synonyms
- Anophia fatilega Felder & Rogenhofer, 1874

Species of moth

Ulotrichopus fatilega is a moth of the family Erebidae. It is found in Kenya, South Africa, Tanzania, Uganda and Zimbabwe.
