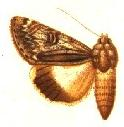

Scientific classification
- Kingdom: Animalia
- Phylum: Arthropoda
- Class: Insecta
- Order: Lepidoptera
- Superfamily: Noctuoidea
- Family: Erebidae
- Genus: Ulotrichopus
- Species: U. tinctipennis

Binomial name
- Ulotrichopus tinctipennis (Hampson, 1902)

Synonyms
- Audea tinctipennis Hampson, 1902; Audea arabica Rebel, 1907

= Ulotrichopus tinctipennis =

Species of moth

Ulotrichopus tinctipennis is a moth of the family Noctuidae first described by George Hampson in 1902. It is found in Botswana, Burkina Faso, Djibouti, Egypt, Ethiopia, Kenya, Mauritania, Namibia, Nigeria, Oman, Saudi Arabia, Somalia, Sudan, Eswatini, Tanzania, United Arab Emirates, Yemen, Zimbabwe, Israel and Jordan.

There is one generation per year. Adults are on wing from December to April.
