= Tachosa fumata =

Scientific classification
- Kingdom: Animalia
- Phylum: Arthropoda
- Clade: Pancrustacea
- Class: Insecta
- Order: Lepidoptera
- Superfamily: Noctuoidea
- Family: Erebidae
- Genus: Tachosa
- Species: T. fumata

Binomial name
- Tachosa fumata (Wallengren, 1860)

Synonyms
- Lophoptera fumata Wallengren, 1860

Species of moth

Tachosa fumata is a moth of the family Erebidae first described by Hans Daniel Johan Wallengren in 1860. It is found in Angola, Burkina Faso, the Democratic Republic of the Congo (Katanga, Orientale), Ethiopia, Kenya, Mauritania, Namibia, South Africa, Tanzania, Uganda and Zimbabwe.
