= Ulotrichopus pseudocatocala =

Scientific classification
- Domain: Eukaryota
- Kingdom: Animalia
- Phylum: Arthropoda
- Class: Insecta
- Order: Lepidoptera
- Superfamily: Noctuoidea
- Family: Erebidae
- Genus: Ulotrichopus
- Species: U. pseudocatocala

Binomial name
- Ulotrichopus pseudocatocala (Strand, 1918)

Synonyms
- Audea pseudocatocala Strand, 1918; Ulotrichopus tessmanni Gaede, 1936; Ulotrichopus catocaloides Strand (nomen nudum)

Species of moth

Ulotrichopus pseudocatocala is a moth of the family Erebidae. It is found in the Democratic Republic of Congo and South Africa, Angola, Cameroon, Equatorial Guinea, Ivory Coast, Rwanda and Uganda.
