= Tachosa guichardi =

Scientific classification
- Kingdom: Animalia
- Phylum: Arthropoda
- Clade: Pancrustacea
- Class: Insecta
- Order: Lepidoptera
- Superfamily: Noctuoidea
- Family: Erebidae
- Genus: Tachosa
- Species: T. guichardi

Binomial name
- Tachosa guichardi (Wiltshire, 1982)

Synonyms
- Audea guichardi Wiltshire, 1982

Species of moth

Tachosa guichardi is a moth of the family Erebidae. It is found in Ethiopia, Kenya, Nigeria, Saudi Arabia, Tanzania and Yemen.
