= Ortalotrypeta macula =

Scientific classification
- Kingdom: Animalia
- Phylum: Arthropoda
- Class: Insecta
- Order: Diptera
- Family: Tephritidae
- Genus: Ortalotrypeta
- Species: O. macula

Binomial name
- Ortalotrypeta macula Wang, 1988

Species of fly

Ortalotrypeta macula is a species of tephritid or fruit flies in the genus Ortalotrypeta of the family Tephritidae.
