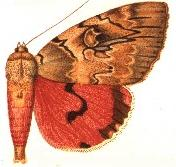

Scientific classification
- Kingdom: Animalia
- Phylum: Arthropoda
- Class: Insecta
- Order: Lepidoptera
- Superfamily: Noctuoidea
- Family: Erebidae
- Genus: Catocala
- Species: C. sponsalis

Binomial name
- Catocala sponsalis Walker, 1858

Synonyms
- Ulothrichopus maccvoodi Hampson, 1913

= Catocala sponsalis =

Species of moth

Catocala sponsalis is a moth of the family Erebidae. It is found in Nepal, China (Hubei) and northern Laos.
