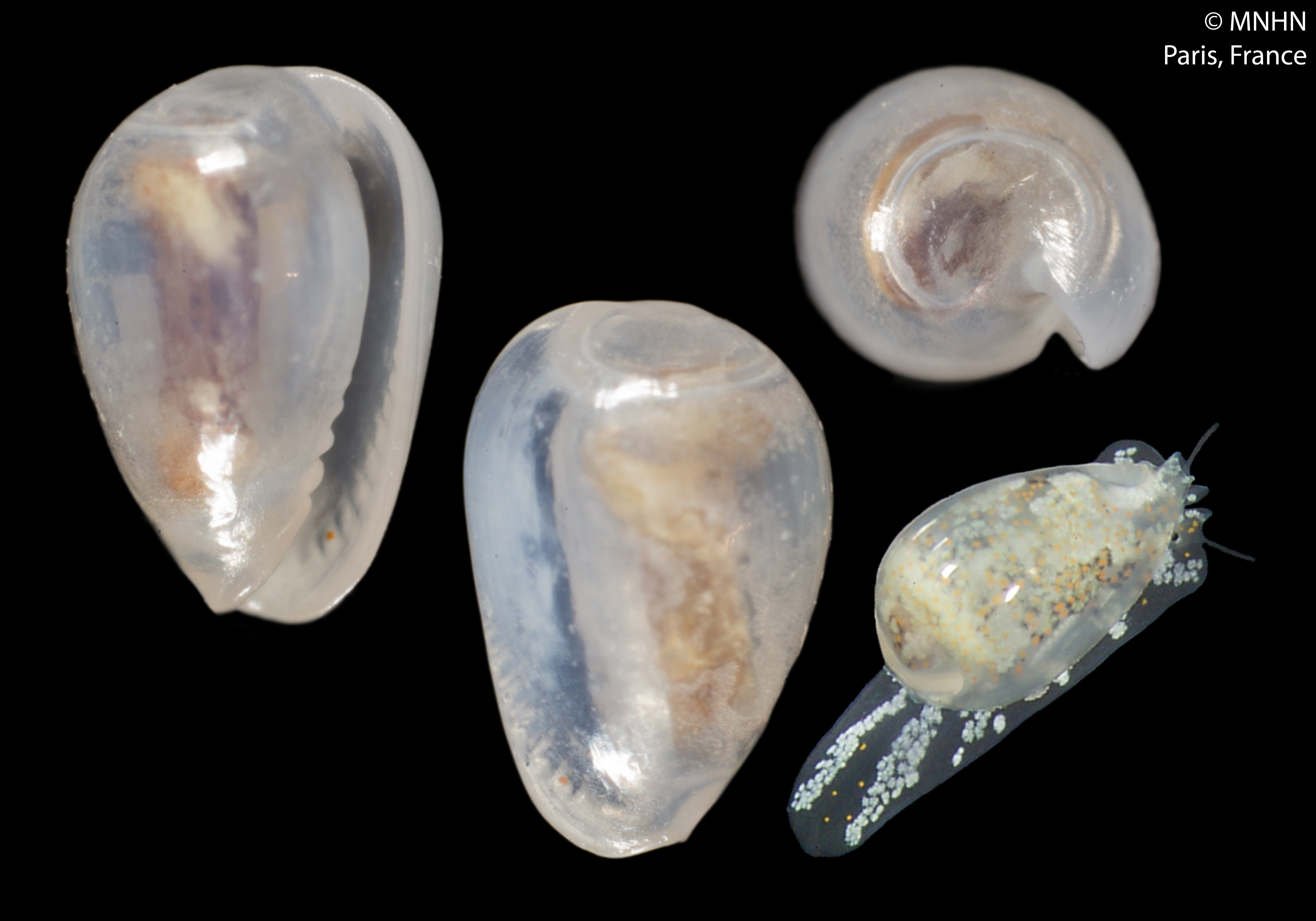
- Shell of Gibberula macula (holotype at MNHN, Paris)

Scientific classification
- Kingdom: Animalia
- Phylum: Mollusca
- Class: Gastropoda
- Subclass: Caenogastropoda
- Order: Neogastropoda
- Family: Cystiscidae
- Subfamily: Cystiscinae
- Genus: Gibberula
- Species: G. macula

Binomial name
- Gibberula macula McCleery, 2009

= Gibberula macula =

Species of gastropod

Gibberula macula is a species of very small sea snail, a marine gastropod mollusk or micromollusk in the family Cystiscidae.

== Description ==
The length of the shell attains 1.77 mm (0.070 in).

== Distribution ==
This species occurs in the Caribbean Sea off Panama.
