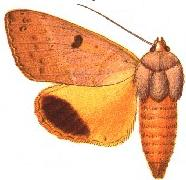
- Male
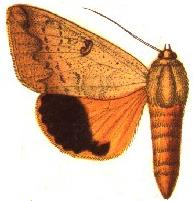
- Female

Scientific classification
- Kingdom: Animalia
- Phylum: Arthropoda
- Class: Insecta
- Order: Lepidoptera
- Superfamily: Noctuoidea
- Family: Erebidae
- Genus: Ophiusa
- Species: O. disjungens

Binomial name
- Ophiusa disjungens (Walker, 1858)

Synonyms
- Othiodes disjungens Walker, 1858; Anua tongaensis Hampson, 1913; Ophiusa tongaensis (Hampson, 1913); Anua timorensis Strand, 1913; Anua timorensis Gaede, 1938; Minucia indiscriminata Hampson, 1893; Ophiusa disjungens indiscriminata (Hampson, 1893); Ophiusa indiscriminata (Hampson, 1893); Anua indiscriminata (Hampson, 1893)

= Ophiusa disjungens =

Species of moth

Ophiusa disjungens, the guava moth, is a moth of the family Erebidae. The species was first described by Francis Walker in 1858. It is found in south-east Asia and the south Pacific, including Thailand, Japan, Tonga and New South Wales and Queensland. The adult is a fruit piercer.

== Description ==
Similar to Ophiusa discriminans, differs in head and thorax being yellowish grey. Abdomen lack black patch. Forewings yellowish grey without black specks. A maculate line runs beyond the postmedial line. A grey and dark patch beyond the sub-apical spots, and hardly a trace of the patch at anal angle. A dentate sub-marginal line with the area beyond it reddish. Hindwing orange with the black reduced to a submarginal medial patch.

Larva pale brownish, with numerous waved longitudinal black lines, between which are black specks series. There are some red between each pair of legs, and a black patch between each pair of prolegs. Small pared dorsal prominences found on 11th somites. The larvae feed on various Myrtaceae species, including Eucalyptus, Syncarpia glomulifera and Psidium guajava.

== Gallery ==
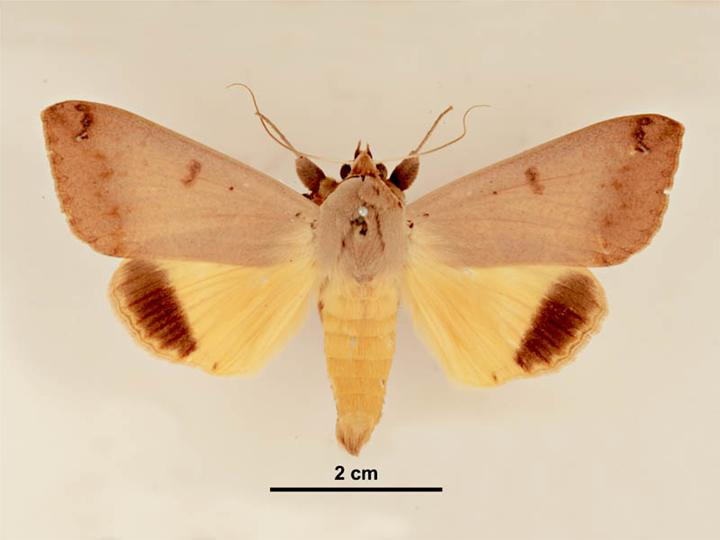
Female, dorsal view

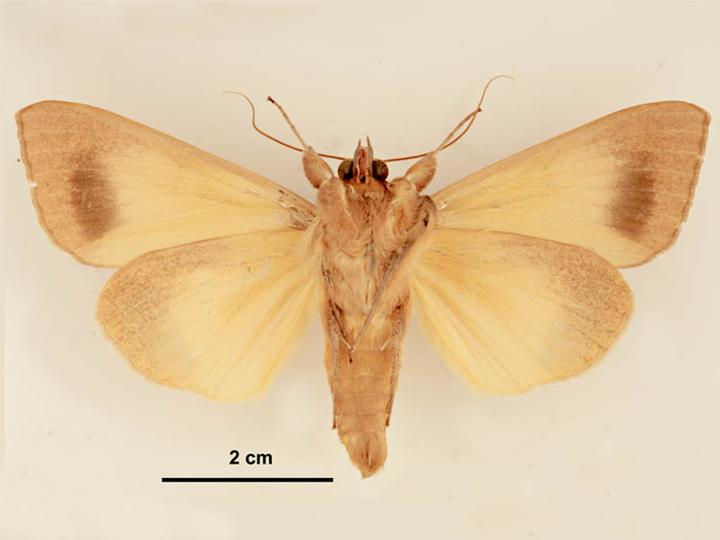
Female, ventral view

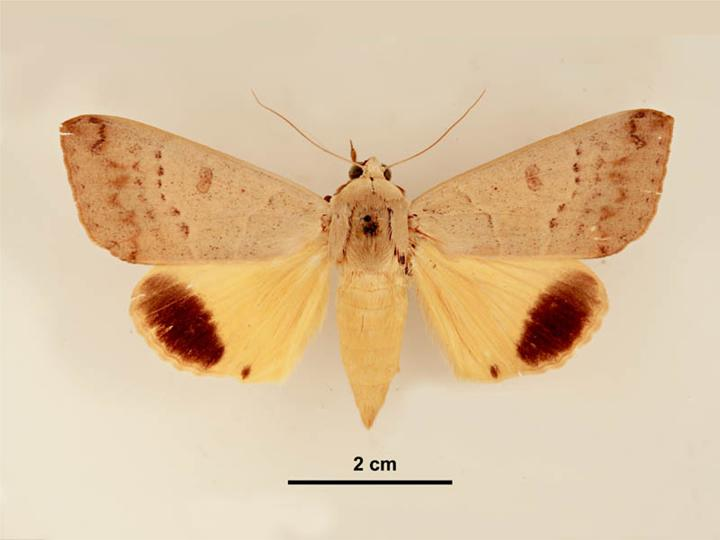
Male, dorsal view

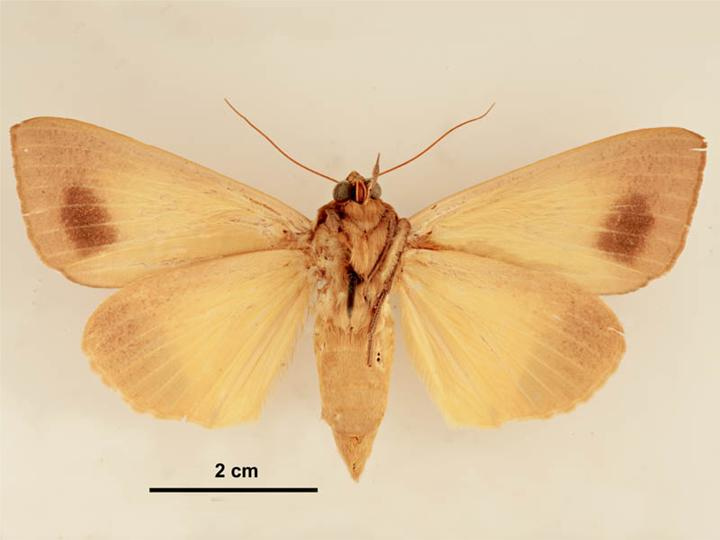
Male, ventral view
