= Ophiusa cancellata =

Scientific classification
- Kingdom: Animalia
- Phylum: Arthropoda
- Clade: Pancrustacea
- Class: Insecta
- Order: Lepidoptera
- Superfamily: Noctuoidea
- Family: Erebidae
- Genus: Ophiusa
- Species: O. cancellata

Binomial name
- Ophiusa cancellata (Saalmüller, 1891)

Synonyms
- Toxocampa cancellata Saalmüller, 1891

Species of moth

Ophiusa cancellata is a moth of the family Erebidae. It is found in subtropical Africa, and it is known from Uganda, the Democratic Republic of the Congo, Madagascar and Zambia.

It looks similar to Ophiusa melaconisia but with yellow rear wings, wingspan is 40–44 mm.
