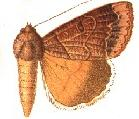

Scientific classification
- Kingdom: Animalia
- Phylum: Arthropoda
- Class: Insecta
- Order: Lepidoptera
- Superfamily: Noctuoidea
- Family: Erebidae
- Genus: Ophiusa
- Species: O. salita

Binomial name
- Ophiusa salita Distant, 1898

Synonyms
- Anua salita (Distant, 1898)

= Ophiusa salita =

Species of moth

Ophiusa salita is a moth of the family Erebidae. It is found in Africa, including South Africa.
