= Ophiusa tirhacoides =

Scientific classification
- Kingdom: Animalia
- Phylum: Arthropoda
- Clade: Pancrustacea
- Class: Insecta
- Order: Lepidoptera
- Superfamily: Noctuoidea
- Family: Erebidae
- Genus: Ophiusa
- Species: O. tirhacoides

Binomial name
- Ophiusa tirhacoides Holloway, 2005

Species of moth

Ophiusa tirhacoides is a moth of the family Erebidae. It is endemic to Borneo.

The wingspan is 25–26 mm.

Larvae have been reared on Casuarina.
