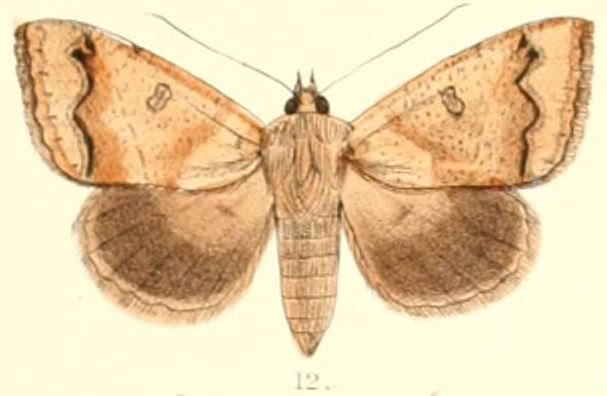

Scientific classification
- Kingdom: Animalia
- Phylum: Arthropoda
- Class: Insecta
- Order: Lepidoptera
- Superfamily: Noctuoidea
- Family: Erebidae
- Genus: Ophiusa
- Species: O. indistincta

Binomial name
- Ophiusa indistincta (Moore, 1882)

Synonyms
- Ophiodes indistincta Moore, 1882

= Ophiusa indistincta =

Species of moth

Ophiusa indistincta is a moth of the family Erebidae first described by Frederic Moore in 1882. It is found in India and Indonesia.
