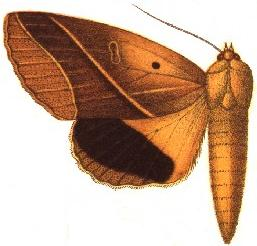

Scientific classification
- Kingdom: Animalia
- Phylum: Arthropoda
- Class: Insecta
- Order: Lepidoptera
- Superfamily: Noctuoidea
- Family: Erebidae
- Genus: Ophiusa
- Species: O. pelor

Binomial name
- Ophiusa pelor (Mabille, 1881)

Synonyms
- Ophiodes pelor Mabille, 1881; Anua pelor (Mabille, 1881)

= Ophiusa pelor =

Species of moth

Ophiusa pelor is a moth of the family Erebidae. It is found in Madagascar.
