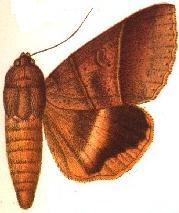

Scientific classification
- Kingdom: Animalia
- Phylum: Arthropoda
- Class: Insecta
- Order: Lepidoptera
- Superfamily: Noctuoidea
- Family: Erebidae
- Genus: Ophiusa
- Species: O. hituense

Binomial name
- Ophiusa hituense (Pagenstecher, 1884)

Synonyms
- Ophisma hituense Pagenstecher, 1884; Thyas amideta Turner, 1903; Ophiusa amideta (Turner, 1903); Anua hituensis Hampson, 1913

= Ophiusa hituense =

Species of moth

Ophiusa hituense is a moth of the family Erebidae. It is endemic to Australia and is found in Queensland.

The wingspan is 50–60 mm.

== Gallery ==
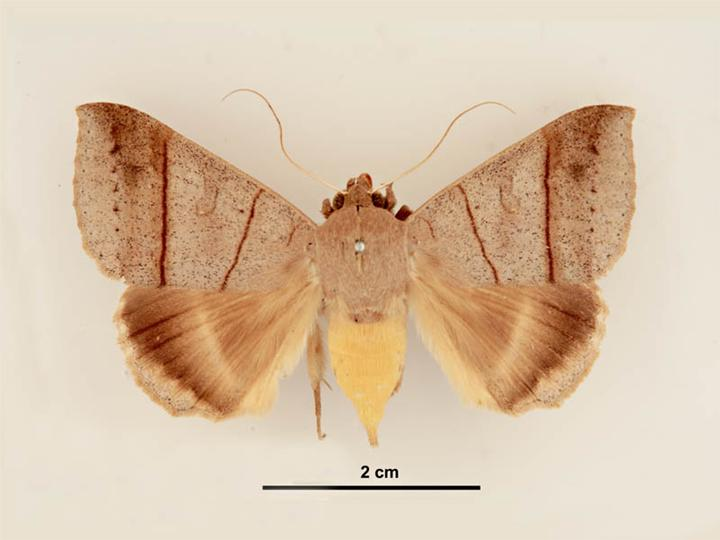
Female, dorsal view

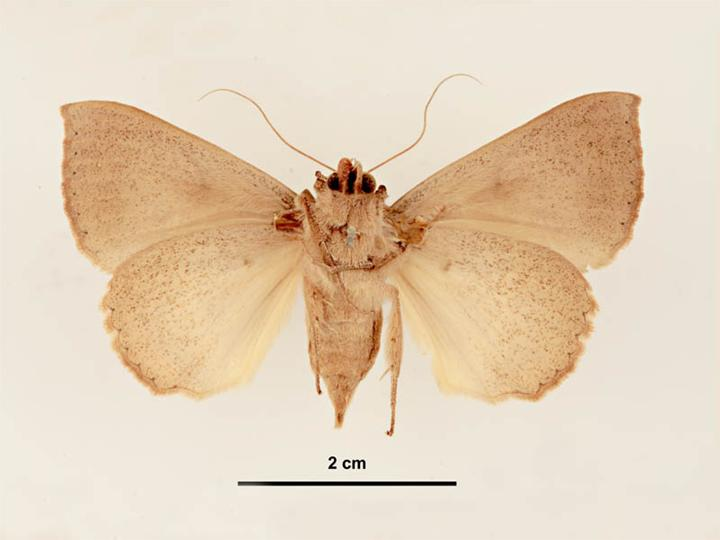
Female, ventral view

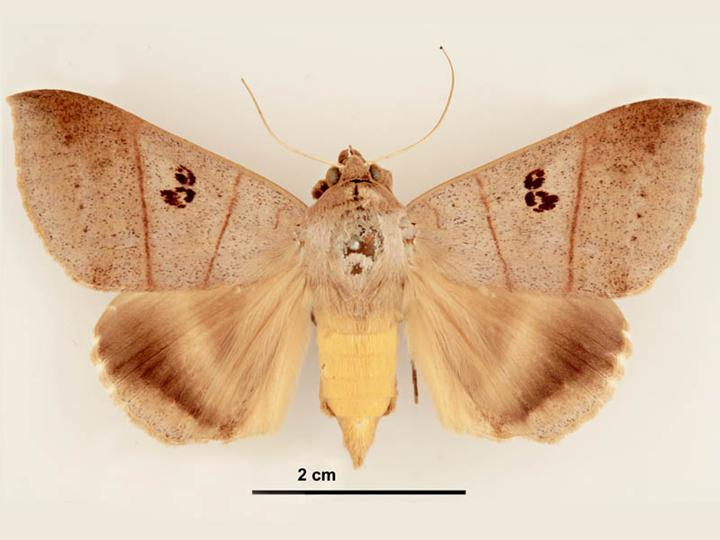
Male, dorsal view

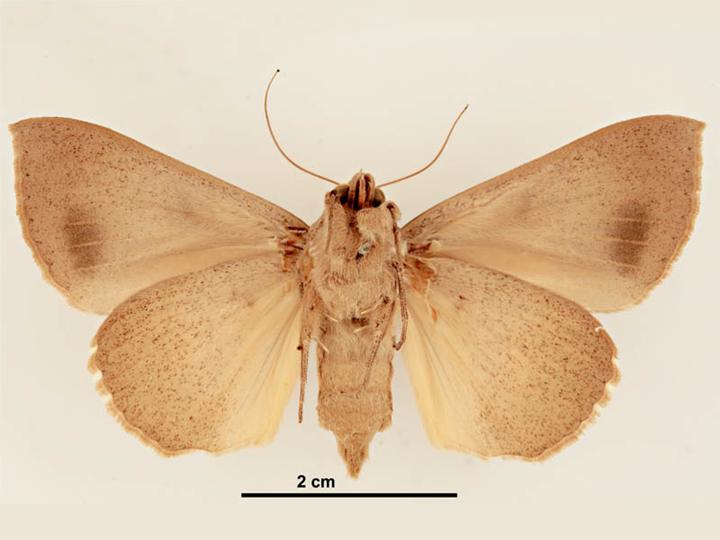
Male, ventral view
