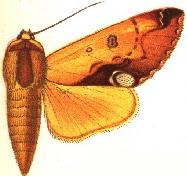

Scientific classification
- Kingdom: Animalia
- Phylum: Arthropoda
- Class: Insecta
- Order: Lepidoptera
- Superfamily: Noctuoidea
- Family: Erebidae
- Genus: Ophiusa
- Species: O. kenricki

Binomial name
- Ophiusa kenricki Bethune-Baker, 1906

Synonyms
- Anua cenricci Hampson, 1913; Ophiusa cenricci (Hampson, 1913); Anua kenricki (Bethune-Baker, 1906)

= Ophiusa kenricki =

Species of moth

Ophiusa kenricki is a moth of the family Erebidae first described by George Thomas Bethune-Baker in 1906. It is found in New Guinea.
