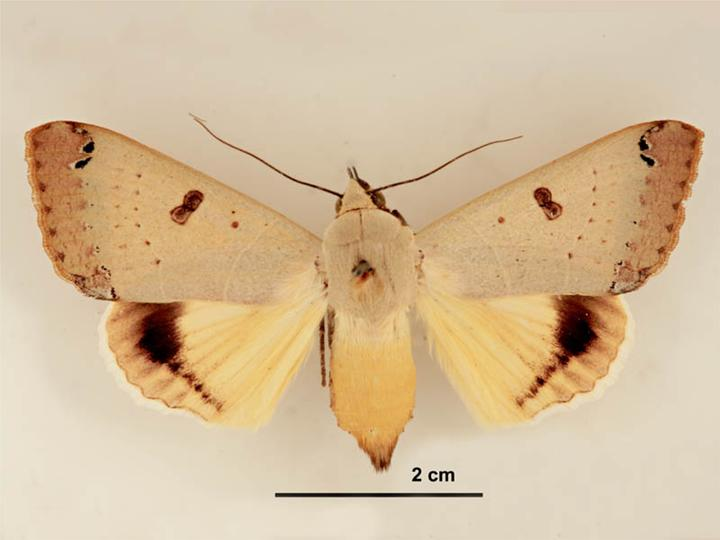
- Female
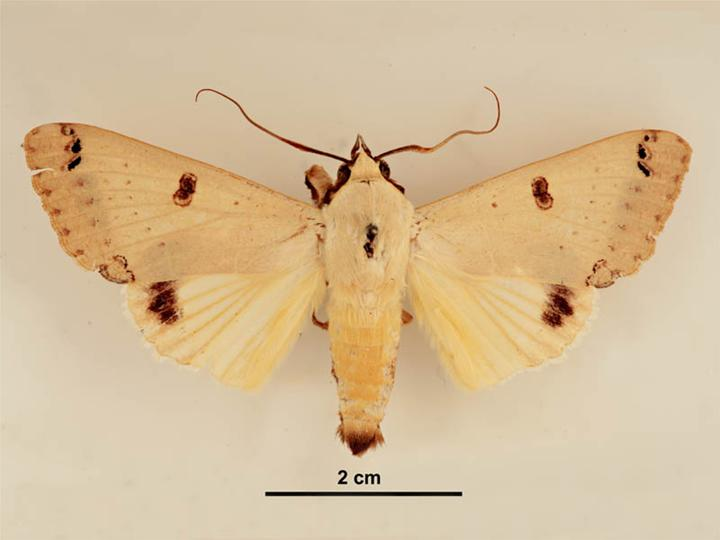
- Male

Scientific classification
- Kingdom: Animalia
- Phylum: Arthropoda
- Class: Insecta
- Order: Lepidoptera
- Superfamily: Noctuoidea
- Family: Erebidae
- Genus: Ophiusa
- Species: O. parcemacula

Binomial name
- Ophiusa parcemacula (T.P. Lucas, 1891)

Synonyms
- Anua parcimacula T.P. Lucas, 1891; Ophiodes parcemacula Lucas, 1891; Ophiodes parcimacula Turner, 1902; Anua sherlockiensis Strand, 1913; Anua sherlockiensis Gaede, 1938

= Ophiusa parcemacula =

Species of moth

Ophiusa parcemacula is a moth of the family Erebidae. It is found in New Guinea, New Caledonia and the northern half of Australia.

The wingspan is about 60 mm.

The larvae feed on Loranthaceae and Melaleuca quinquenervia.
