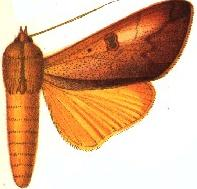

Scientific classification
- Kingdom: Animalia
- Phylum: Arthropoda
- Class: Insecta
- Order: Lepidoptera
- Superfamily: Noctuoidea
- Family: Erebidae
- Genus: Ophiusa
- Species: O. arfaki

Binomial name
- Ophiusa arfaki Bethune-Baker 1910

Synonyms
- Ophiusa arfaci (Hampson, 1913); Anua arfaci Hampson, 1913

= Ophiusa arfaki =

Species of moth

Ophiusa arfaki is a moth of the family Erebidae. It is found in New Guinea.
