= Ophiusa costiplaga =

Scientific classification
- Kingdom: Animalia
- Phylum: Arthropoda
- Class: Insecta
- Order: Lepidoptera
- Superfamily: Noctuoidea
- Family: Erebidae
- Genus: Ophiusa
- Species: O. costiplaga

Binomial name
- Ophiusa costiplaga (Hulstaert, 1924)

Synonyms
- Anua costiplaga Hulstaert, 1924

Species of moth

Ophiusa costiplaga is a moth of the family Erebidae. It is found on Kei, New Guinea and the coast of the Northern Territory of Australia.
