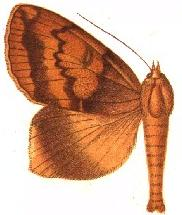

Scientific classification
- Kingdom: Animalia
- Phylum: Arthropoda
- Class: Insecta
- Order: Lepidoptera
- Superfamily: Noctuoidea
- Family: Erebidae
- Genus: Ophiusa
- Species: O. xylochroa

Binomial name
- Ophiusa xylochroa (H. Druce, 1912)

Synonyms
- Anua xylochroa H. Druce, 1912

= Ophiusa xylochroa =

Species of moth

Ophiusa xylochroa is a moth of the family Erebidae first described by Herbert Druce in 1912. It is found in Africa, including Congo region.
