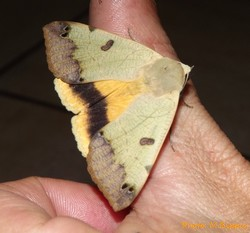
- Ophiusa legendrei

Scientific classification
- Kingdom: Animalia
- Phylum: Arthropoda
- Clade: Pancrustacea
- Class: Insecta
- Order: Lepidoptera
- Superfamily: Noctuoidea
- Family: Erebidae
- Tribe: Ophiusini
- Genus: Ophiusa; Ochsenheimer, 1816

Synonyms
- Anua Walker, 1858; Hemachra Sodoffsky, 1837; Meropis Hübner, 1818; Ophiogenes Reichenbach, 1817; Stenopis Mabille, 1880; Peranua Berio, 1959; Subanua Berio, 1959; Trichanua Berio, 1954; Perophiusa Berio, 1959

= Ophiusa (moth) =

Genus of moths

Ophiusa is a genus of moths in the family Erebidae erected by Ferdinand Ochsenheimer in 1816.

== Description ==
Palpi upturned and smoothly scaled, where the second joint reaching vertex of head and third joint variable in length and longer in female than male. Thorax and abdomen smoothly scaled. Mid tibia spiny and sometimes hind tibia as well. Tibia fringed with long hair in male. Forewings with somewhat acute apex. The outer margin nearly straight. Hindwings with slightly angled outer margin at vein 2. Larva with four pairs of abdominal prolegs, where the first pair or two pairs are rudimentary.

== Species ==
- Ophiusa alorensis (Gaede, 1938)
- Ophiusa alticola (Hampson, 1913)
- Ophiusa ambigua (Gerstaecker, 1871)
- Ophiusa anomala (Berio, 1955)
- Ophiusa arfaki Bethune-Baker 1910
- Ophiusa cancellata (Saalmüller, 1891)
- Ophiusa conspicienda (Walker, 1858)
- Ophiusa costiplaga (Hulstaert, 1924)
- Ophiusa dargei (Laporte, 1977)
- Ophiusa david (Holland, 1894)
- Ophiusa davidioides (Strand, 1918)
- Ophiusa dianaris (Guenée, 1852)
- Ophiusa despecta (Holland, 1894)
- Ophiusa diagarmma Lower, 1903
- Ophiusa digona Mabille, 1879
- Ophiusa dilecta Walker, 1865
- Ophiusa discriminans (Walker, 1858)
- Ophiusa disjungens (Walker, 1858)
- Ophiusa fijiensis (Robinson, 1969)
- Ophiusa finifascia (Walker, 1858)
- Ophiusa flavociliata (Aurivillius, 1925)
- Ophiusa gonoptera Hampson, 1910
- Ophiusa grandidieri (Viette, 1966)
- Ophiusa hituense (Pagenstecher, 1884)
- Ophiusa hopei Boisduval, 1833
- Ophiusa hypoxantha (Hampson, 1918)
- Ophiusa inangulata (Gaede, 1917)
- Ophiusa indistincta Moore, 1882
- Ophiusa kenricki Bethune-Baker 1906
- Ophiusa legendrei Viette, 1966
- Ophiusa mabillei (Viette, 1974)
- Ophiusa mejanesi (Guenée, 1852)
- Ophiusa melaconisia Hampson, 1905
- Ophiusa microtirhaca Sugi, 1990
- Ophiusa mimetica (Berio, 1954)
- Ophiusa nocturnia Hampson, 1902
- Ophiusa novenaria (Lucas, 1898)
- Ophiusa obsolescens (Hampson, 1918)
- Ophiusa olista Swinhoe, 1893
- Ophiusa overlaeti (Berio, 1956)
- Ophiusa parcemacula (Lucas, 1891)
- Ophiusa pelor (Mabille, 1881)
- Ophiusa pseudotirhaca (Berio, 1956)
- Ophiusa punctiquadrata (Berio, 1974)
- Ophiusa rectificata (Berio, 1941)
- Ophiusa recurvata (Hampson, 1913)
- Ophiusa reducta (Mabille, 1880)
- Ophiusa rogata (Berio, 1954)
- Ophiusa rufescens (Hampson, 1913)
- Ophiusa salita Distant, 1898
- Ophiusa samoensis (Tams, 1935)
- Ophiusa selenaris (Guenée, 1852)
- Ophiusa simplex Berio, 1978
- Ophiusa subdiversa (L. B. Prout, 1919)
- Ophiusa tettensis (Hopffer, 1858)
- Ophiusa tirhaca (Cramer, [1777])
- Ophiusa tirhacoides Holloway, 2005
- Ophiusa trapezium Guenée, 1852
- Ophiusa triphaenoides Walker, 1858
- Ophiusa tumidilinea Walker, 1858
- Ophiusa tumiditermina Hampson, 1910
- Ophiusa umbrilinea (Hampson, 1902)
- Ophiusa verecunda (Holland, 1894)
- Ophiusa violascens Hampson, 1902
- Ophiusa violisparsa (L. B. Prout, 1919)
- Ophiusa waterloti Viette, 1982
- Ophiusa xylochroa (Druce, 1912)

Ophiusa coronata Fabricius, 1775 is now placed in Thyas as Thyas coronata.
