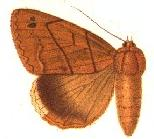

Scientific classification
- Kingdom: Animalia
- Phylum: Arthropoda
- Class: Insecta
- Order: Lepidoptera
- Superfamily: Noctuoidea
- Family: Erebidae
- Genus: Ophiusa
- Species: O. despecta

Binomial name
- Ophiusa despecta (Holland, 1894)

Synonyms
- Minucia despecta Holland, 1894; Anua despecta (Holland, 1894)

= Ophiusa despecta =

Species of moth

Ophiusa despecta is a moth of the family Erebidae. It is found in Africa, including Nigeria, Gabon and Príncipe.
