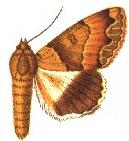

Scientific classification
- Kingdom: Animalia
- Phylum: Arthropoda
- Class: Insecta
- Order: Lepidoptera
- Superfamily: Noctuoidea
- Family: Erebidae
- Genus: Ophiusa
- Species: O. umbrilinea

Binomial name
- Ophiusa umbrilinea (Hampson, 1902)

Synonyms
- Ophius umbrilinea Hampson, 1902; Anua umbrilinca (Hampson, 1902); Ophiusa umbrilinca (Hampson, 1902)

= Ophiusa umbrilinea =

Species of moth

Ophiusa umbrilinea is a moth of the family Erebidae. It is found in Africa, including Namibia.
