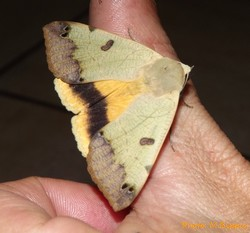

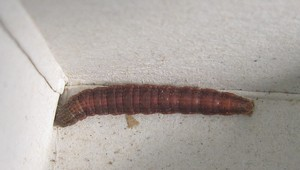

Scientific classification
- Kingdom: Animalia
- Phylum: Arthropoda
- Class: Insecta
- Order: Lepidoptera
- Superfamily: Noctuoidea
- Family: Erebidae
- Genus: Ophiusa
- Species: O. legendrei

Binomial name
- Ophiusa legendrei Viette, 1967

= Ophiusa legendrei =

Species of moth

Ophiusa legendrei is a moth of the family Erebidae first described by Pierre Viette in 1967. It is found on the Comoros, Réunion, Madagascar and in Mozambique.

Ophiusa legendrei is one of the few insects present on Europa Island.

The larvae feed on Schinus terebinthifolius.
