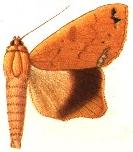

Scientific classification
- Kingdom: Animalia
- Phylum: Arthropoda
- Class: Insecta
- Order: Lepidoptera
- Superfamily: Noctuoidea
- Family: Erebidae
- Genus: Ophiusa
- Species: O. rufescens

Binomial name
- Ophiusa rufescens (Hampson, 1913)

Synonyms
- Anua rufescens Hampson, 1913

= Ophiusa rufescens =

Species of moth

Ophiusa rufescens is a moth of the family Erebidae. It is found in Africa, including Sierra Leone.
