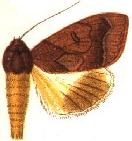

Scientific classification
- Kingdom: Animalia
- Phylum: Arthropoda
- Class: Insecta
- Order: Lepidoptera
- Superfamily: Noctuoidea
- Family: Erebidae
- Genus: Ophiusa
- Species: O. finifascia

Binomial name
- Ophiusa finifascia (Walker, 1858)

Synonyms
- Ophiusa amplior (Walker, 1858); Ophiusa lilaceofasciasta (Pagenstecher, 1907); Anua finifascia (Walker, 1858); Anua amplior Walker, 1858; Nephelodes finifascia Walker, 1858; Pseudophia lilaceofasciata Pagenstecher, 1907

= Ophiusa finifascia =

Species of moth

Ophiusa finifascia is a moth of the family Erebidae. It is found in Africa, including South Africa and the Comores.
