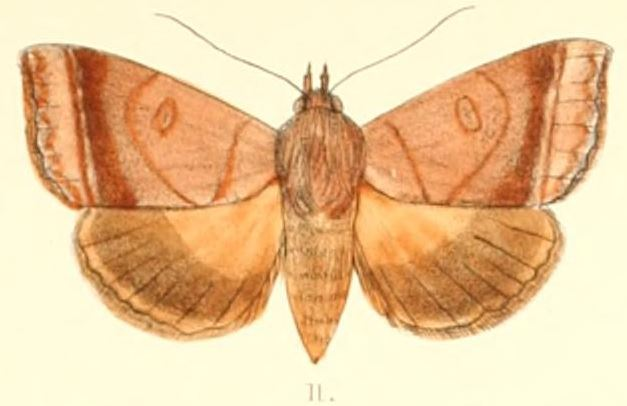

Scientific classification
- Kingdom: Animalia
- Phylum: Arthropoda
- Class: Insecta
- Order: Lepidoptera
- Superfamily: Noctuoidea
- Family: Erebidae
- Genus: Ophiusa
- Species: O. trapezium

Binomial name
- Ophiusa trapezium (Guenée, 1852)

Synonyms
- Ophiodes trapezium Guenée, 1852; Ophisma circumferens Walker, 1865; Ophiusa circumferens (Walker, 1865); Ophisma cognata Walker, 1865; Ophiusa cognata (Walker, 1865); Ophiodes adusta Moore, 1882; Ophiusa adusta (Moore, 1882); Minucia prunicolor Moore, 1885; Ophiusa prunicolor (Moore, 1885); Ophiusa kebea Bethune-Baker, 1906; Anua trapezium Guenée; Holloway, 1976; Ophiusa circumferens (Walker, 1865)

= Ophiusa trapezium =

Species of moth

Ophiusa trapezium is a moth of the family Erebidae first described by Achille Guenée in 1852. It is found from the Indo-Australian tropics of India, Sri Lanka to Queensland, the Bismarck Islands and New Caledonia. Adults are fruit piercers.

== Description ==
It has a wingspan of 66 mm. The head and thorax are bright rufous. Shaft of antennae whitish. Abdomen brownish fuscous. Forewings bright rufous suffused with purplish as far as the postmedial line and beyond the submarginal line. There is an outwardly oblique antemedial line jointed at inner margin by the obliquely waved postmedial line. The reniform with rufous outline. A double sub-marginal straight line and marginal dentate line. Hindwings brownish ochreous. The inner area clothed with fuscous hair. A broad diffused sub-marginal fuscous band present. Ventral side brownish ochreous. Forewings with fuscous cell and a submarginal patch.

Larvae have been reared on Melaleuca species (Myrtaceae) and Melastoma malabathricum (Melastomataceae).

== Gallery ==
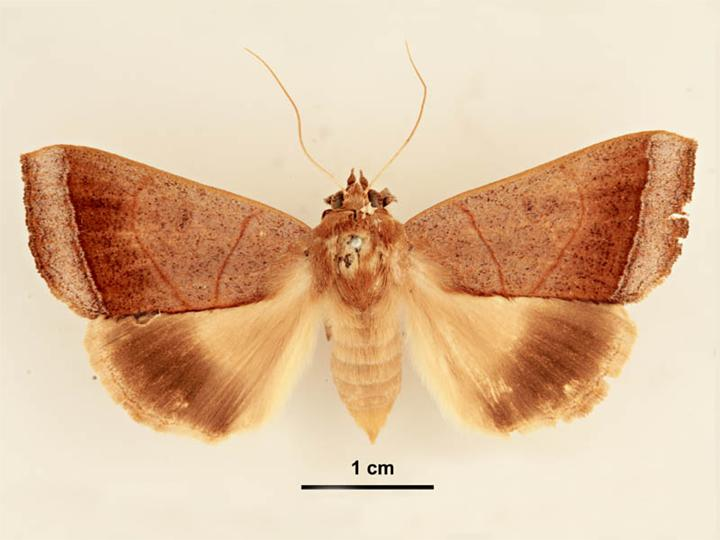
Female, dorsal view

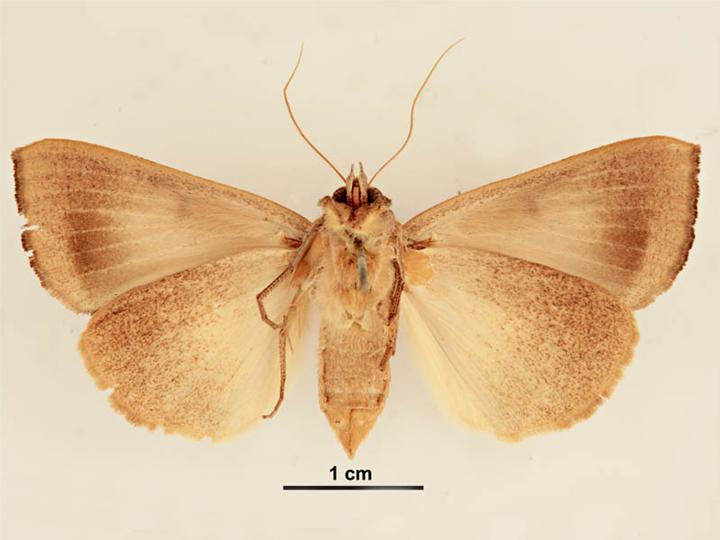
Female, ventral view

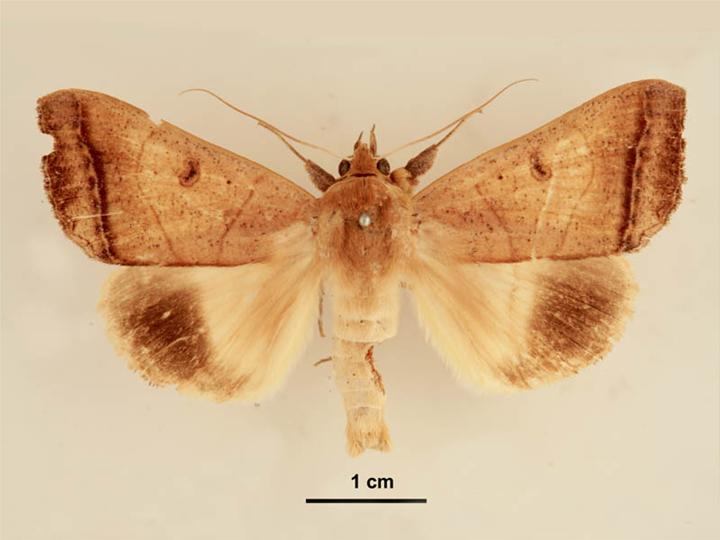
Male, dorsal view

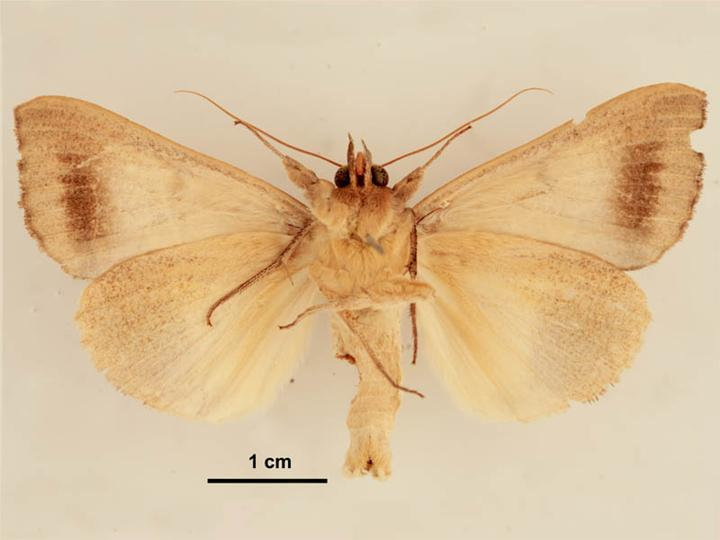
Male, ventral view
