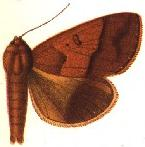

Scientific classification
- Kingdom: Animalia
- Phylum: Arthropoda
- Class: Insecta
- Order: Lepidoptera
- Superfamily: Noctuoidea
- Family: Erebidae
- Genus: Ophiusa
- Species: O. verecunda

Binomial name
- Ophiusa verecunda (Holland, 1894)

Synonyms
- Minucia verecunda Holland, 1894; Anua verecunda (Holland, 1894)

= Ophiusa verecunda =

Species of moth

Ophiusa verecunda is a moth of the family Erebidae. It is found in Africa, including Gabon.

== Subspecies ==
- Ophiusa verecunda verecunda
- Ophiusa verecunda verecundoides
