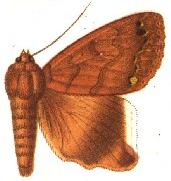

Scientific classification
- Kingdom: Animalia
- Phylum: Arthropoda
- Class: Insecta
- Order: Lepidoptera
- Superfamily: Noctuoidea
- Family: Erebidae
- Genus: Ophiusa
- Species: O. conspicienda

Binomial name
- Ophiusa conspicienda (Walker, 1858)

Synonyms
- Ophiusa producta (Holland, 1894); Ophiusa rubrescens (L.B. Prout, 1919); Anua conspicienda (Walker, 1858); Achaea conspicienda Walker, 1858; Minucia producta Holland, 1894

= Ophiusa conspicienda =

Species of moth

Ophiusa conspicienda is a moth of the family Erebidae. It is found in West Africa, Gabon and Uganda. It is in a genus with 48 other moths and was classified in 1858.
