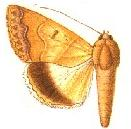

Scientific classification
- Kingdom: Animalia
- Phylum: Arthropoda
- Class: Insecta
- Order: Lepidoptera
- Superfamily: Noctuoidea
- Family: Erebidae
- Genus: Ophiusa
- Species: O. tettensis

Binomial name
- Ophiusa tettensis (Hopffer, 1858)

Synonyms
- Ophiusa cameronis (Plötz, 1880); Ophiusa expedita (Walker, 1858); Ophiodes tettensis Hopffer, 1858; Anua tettensis (Hopffer, 1858); Ophiodes cameronis Plötz, 1880; Ophisma expedita Walker, 1858

= Ophiusa tettensis =

Species of moth

Ophiusa tettensis is a moth of the family Erebidae. It is found in Africa, including Mozambique, South Africa and the Congo.

A known foodplant of this species is Combretum indicum (a Combretaceae).
