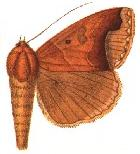

Scientific classification
- Kingdom: Animalia
- Phylum: Arthropoda
- Class: Insecta
- Order: Lepidoptera
- Superfamily: Noctuoidea
- Family: Erebidae
- Genus: Ophiusa
- Species: O. recurvata

Binomial name
- Ophiusa recurvata (Hampson, 1913)

Synonyms
- Anua recurvata Hampson, 1913

= Ophiusa recurvata =

Species of moth

Ophiusa recurvata is a moth of the family Erebidae. It is found in Africa, including Ghana.
