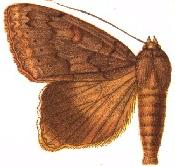

Scientific classification
- Kingdom: Animalia
- Phylum: Arthropoda
- Class: Insecta
- Order: Lepidoptera
- Superfamily: Noctuoidea
- Family: Erebidae
- Genus: Ophiusa
- Species: O. tumiditermina

Binomial name
- Ophiusa tumiditermina Hampson, 1910

Synonyms
- Ophiusa fumida (Hampson, 1913); Ophiusa hampsoni (Holland, 1920); Anua fumida Hampson, 1913; Anua hampsoni Holland, 1920

= Ophiusa tumiditermina =

Species of moth

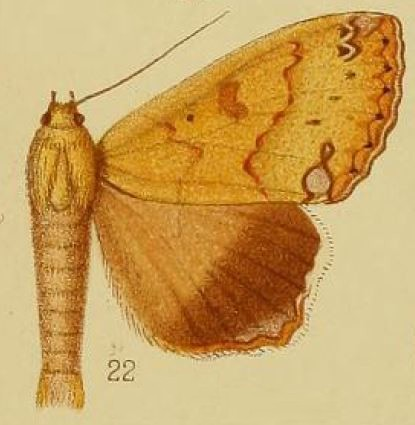
Ophiusa tumiditermina

Ophiusa tumiditermina is a moth of the family Erebidae. It is found in Africa, including South Africa, Zambia and Príncipe.
