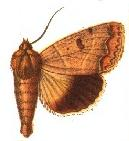

Scientific classification
- Kingdom: Animalia
- Phylum: Arthropoda
- Class: Insecta
- Order: Lepidoptera
- Superfamily: Noctuoidea
- Family: Erebidae
- Genus: Ophiusa
- Species: O. alticola

Binomial name
- Ophiusa alticola (Hampson, 1913)

Synonyms
- Anua alticola Hampson 1913

= Ophiusa alticola =

Species of moth

Ophiusa alticola is a moth of the family Erebidae first described by George Hampson in 1913. It is found in India.
