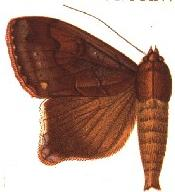

Scientific classification
- Kingdom: Animalia
- Phylum: Arthropoda
- Class: Insecta
- Order: Lepidoptera
- Superfamily: Noctuoidea
- Family: Erebidae
- Genus: Ophiusa
- Species: O. reducta

Binomial name
- Ophiusa reducta (Mabille, 1880)

Synonyms
- Stenopis reducta Mabille, 1880; Anua reducta (Mabille, 1880)

= Ophiusa reducta =

Species of moth

Ophiusa reducta is a moth of the family Erebidae. It is found in Madagascar.

Larval food-plant is Combretum indicum, a Combretaceae.
