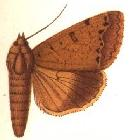

Scientific classification
- Kingdom: Animalia
- Phylum: Arthropoda
- Class: Insecta
- Order: Lepidoptera
- Superfamily: Noctuoidea
- Family: Erebidae
- Genus: Ophiusa
- Species: O. olista

Binomial name
- Ophiusa olista C. Swinhoe, 1893

Synonyms
- Anua olista (C. Swinhoe, 1893)

= Ophiusa olista =

Species of moth

Ophiusa olista is a moth of the family Erebidae first described by Charles Swinhoe in 1893. It is found in China, Thailand and Japan.

The wingspan is 46–48 mm.
