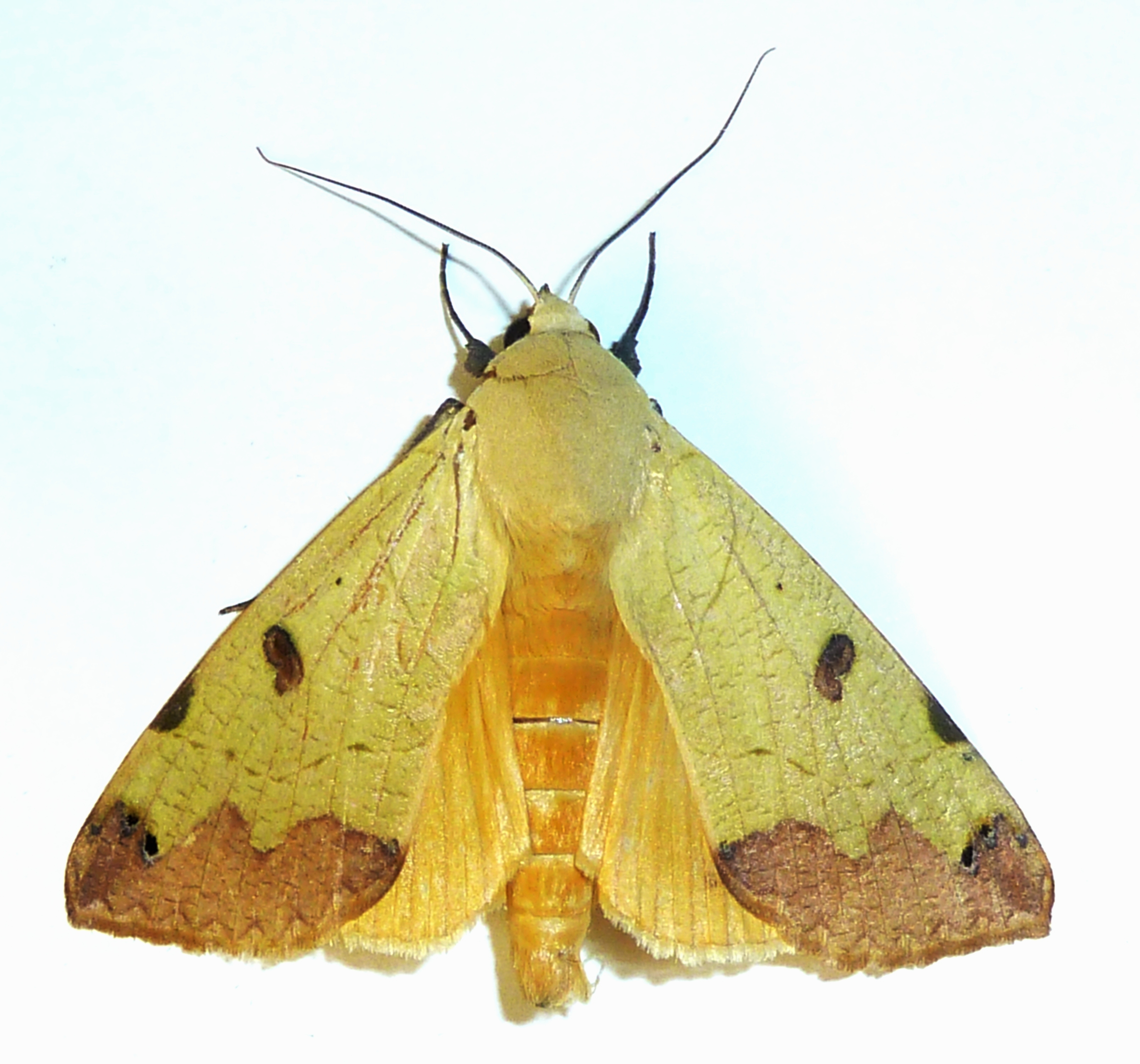

Scientific classification
- Kingdom: Animalia
- Phylum: Arthropoda
- Class: Insecta
- Order: Lepidoptera
- Superfamily: Noctuoidea
- Family: Erebidae
- Genus: Ophiusa
- Species: O. tirhaca

Binomial name
- Ophiusa tirhaca (Cramer, 1777)

Synonyms
- Phalaena tirhaca Cramer, 1777; Noctua tirrhaea Fabricius, 1781; Noctua vesta Esper, 1789; Noctua auricularis Hübner, 1803; Ophiodes hottentota Guenée, 1852; Ophiodes separans Walker, 1858; Anua absens Warren, 1913; Anua pura Warren, 1913; Anua clementi Swinhoe, 1918; Ophiusa vesta (Esper, 1789); Ophiusa auricularis (Hübner, 1803); Ophiusa hottentota (Guenée, 1852); Ophiusa separans (Walker, 1858); Ophiusa clementi (Swinhoe, 1918); Ophiusa tirrhaea (Fabricius, 1781); Ophiusa demarginata Heydemann et al., 1963; Ophiusa obscura Pinker & Bacallado, 1978

= Ophiusa tirhaca =

Green drab

Species of moth

Ophiusa tirhaca, the green drab, is a moth of the family Erebidae. The species was first described by Pieter Cramer in 1777. It is found in southern Europe, Africa, Australia and the southern parts of Asia.

The wingspan is about 50 mm.

The larvae feed on heath, Pistacia lentiscus, Pistacia terebinthus, Cotinus coggygria, Rhus coriaria, Rhus cotinus, Cistus, Eucalyptus, Osyris, Viburnum and Pelargonium.

== Gallery ==
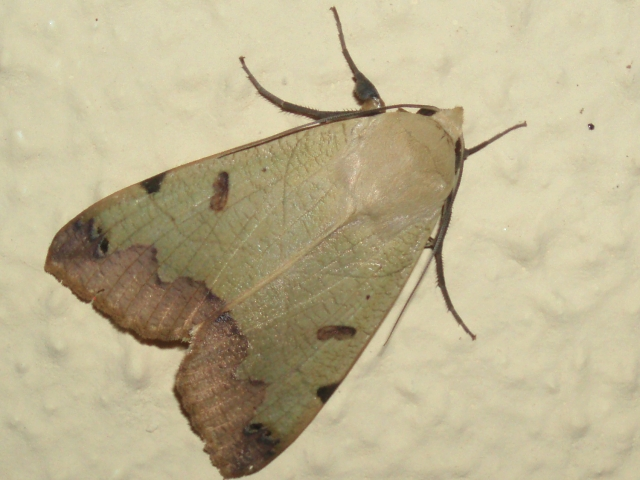

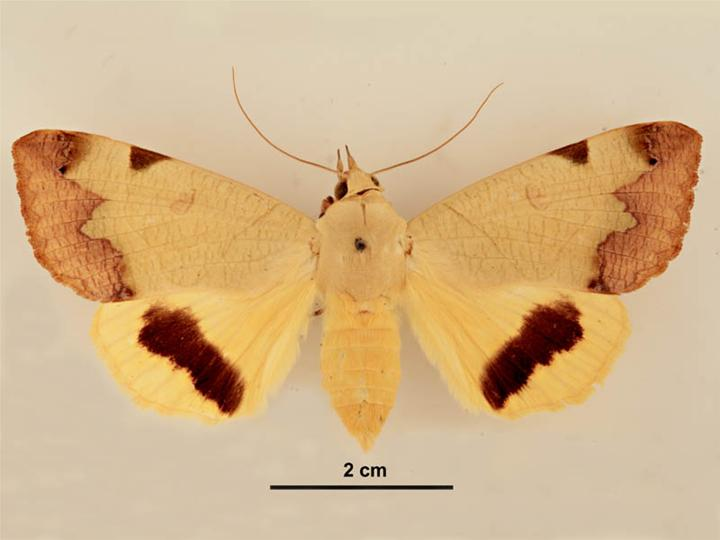
Female, dorsal view

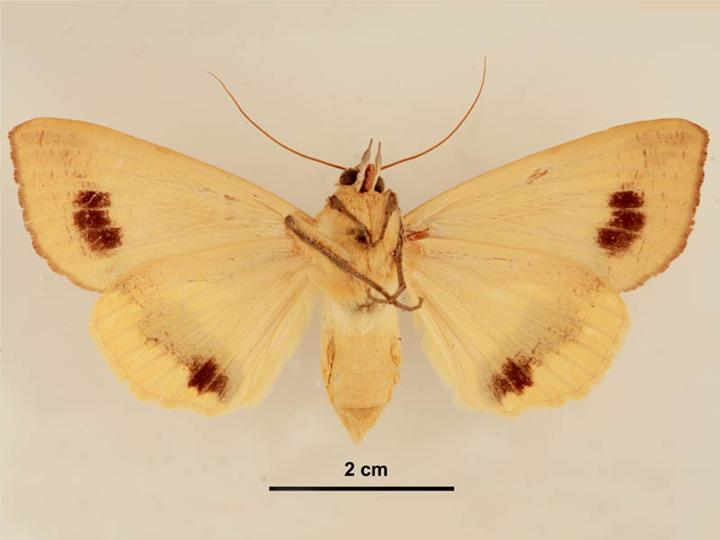
Female, ventral view

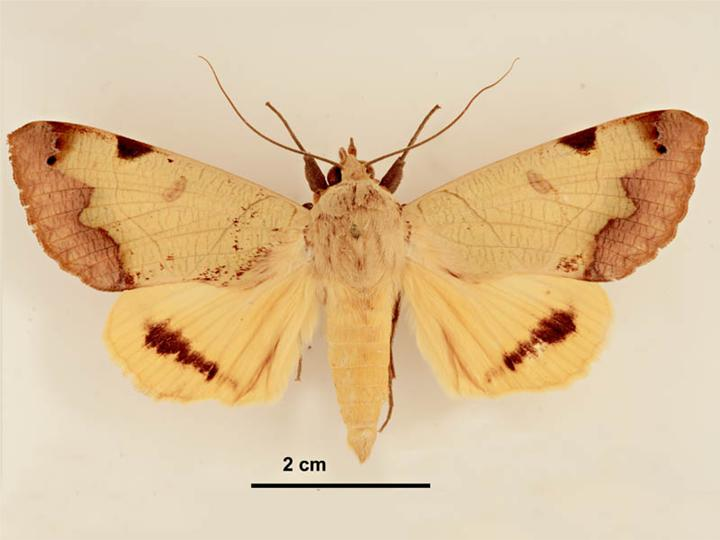
Male, dorsal view

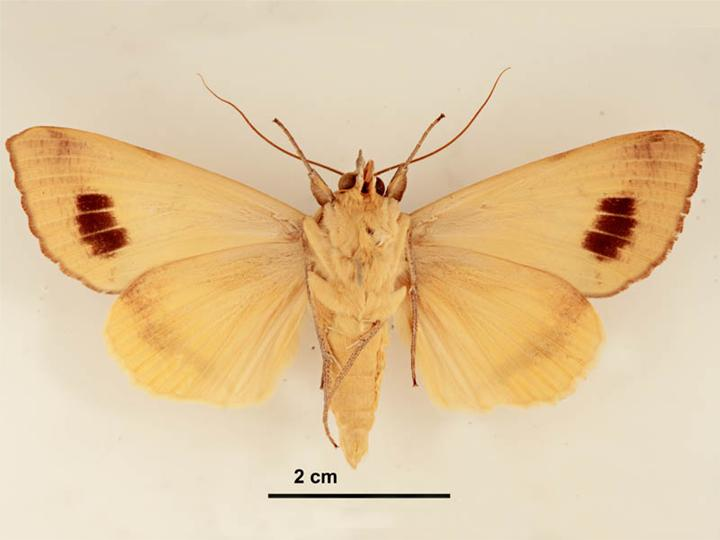
Male, ventral view
