= Ophiusa microtirhaca =

Scientific classification
- Kingdom: Animalia
- Phylum: Arthropoda
- Clade: Pancrustacea
- Class: Insecta
- Order: Lepidoptera
- Superfamily: Noctuoidea
- Family: Erebidae
- Genus: Ophiusa
- Species: O. microtirhaca

Binomial name
- Ophiusa microtirhaca Sugi, 1990

Species of moth

Ophiusa microtirhaca is a moth of the family Erebidae first described by Shigero Sugi in 1990. It is found in Asia, including Japan.
