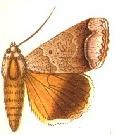

Scientific classification
- Kingdom: Animalia
- Phylum: Arthropoda
- Class: Insecta
- Order: Lepidoptera
- Superfamily: Noctuoidea
- Family: Erebidae
- Genus: Ophiusa
- Species: O. violascens

Binomial name
- Ophiusa violascens Hampson, 1902

Synonyms
- Anua violascens (Hampson, 1902)

= Ophiusa violascens =

Species of moth

Ophiusa violascens is a moth of the family Erebidae. It is found in Africa, including South Africa.
