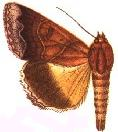

Scientific classification
- Kingdom: Animalia
- Phylum: Arthropoda
- Class: Insecta
- Order: Lepidoptera
- Superfamily: Noctuoidea
- Family: Erebidae
- Genus: Ophiusa
- Species: O. mejanesi

Binomial name
- Ophiusa mejanesi (Guenée, 1852)

Synonyms
- Anua mejanesi (Guenée, 1852); Ophiodes mejanesi Guenée, 1852; Trichanua mejanesi (Guenée, 1852); Ophiusa (Trichanua) mejanesi (Guenée, 1852)

= Ophiusa mejanesi =

Species of moth

Ophiusa mejanesi is a moth of the family Erebidae first described by Achille Guenée in 1852. It is found in Africa, including Senegal and South Africa.
