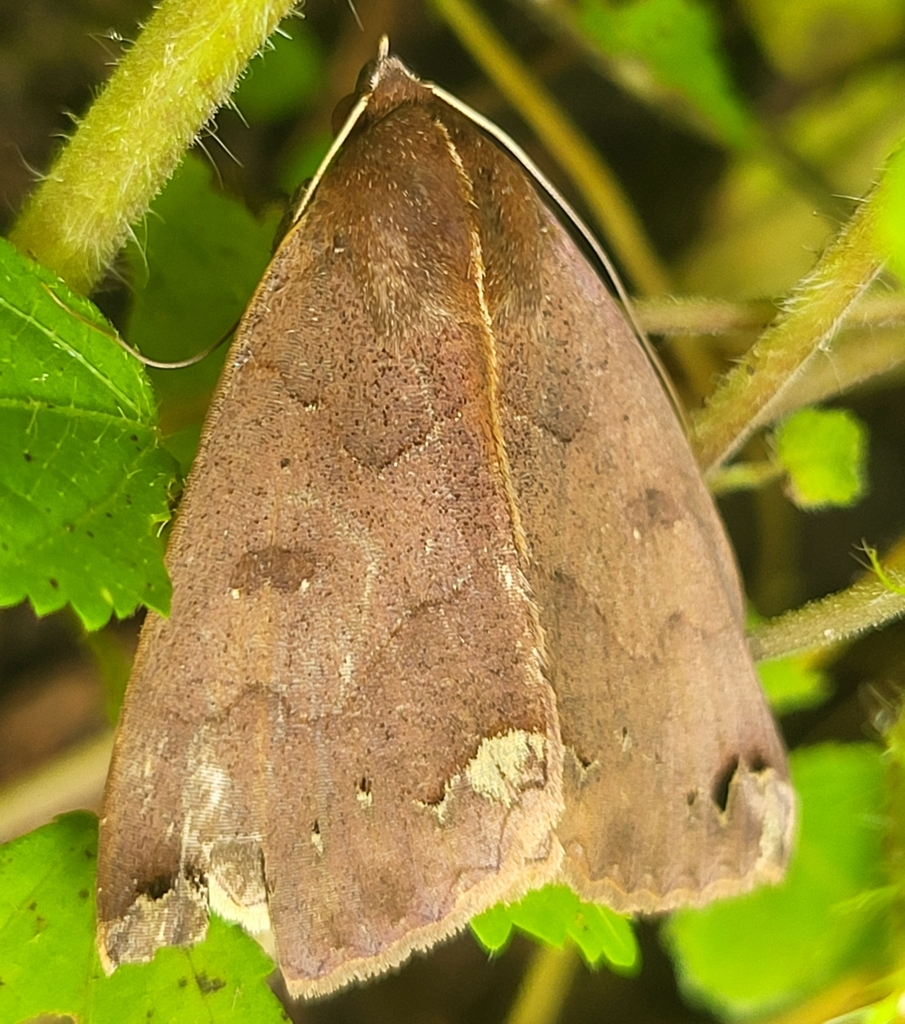
- Ophiusa subdiversa

Scientific classification
- Kingdom: Animalia
- Phylum: Arthropoda
- Clade: Pancrustacea
- Class: Insecta
- Order: Lepidoptera
- Superfamily: Noctuoidea
- Family: Erebidae
- Genus: Ophiusa
- Species: O. subdiversa

Binomial name
- Ophiusa subdiversa Prout, 1919

Synonyms
- Stenopis subdiversa (Prout L.B., 1919); Anua subdiversa (Prout L.B., 1919)

= Ophiusa subdiversa =

Species of moth in Africa

Ophiusa subdiversa is a species of moth in the Family Erebidae.

== Description ==
This species was described by Louis Beethoven Prout in 1919.

== Range ==
It is found in The Gambia, Ghana, South Africa, and Democratic Republic of the Congo.
