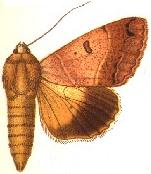

Scientific classification
- Kingdom: Animalia
- Phylum: Arthropoda
- Class: Insecta
- Order: Lepidoptera
- Superfamily: Noctuoidea
- Family: Erebidae
- Genus: Ophiusa
- Species: O. triphaenoides

Binomial name
- Ophiusa triphaenoides (Walker, 1858)

Synonyms
- Ophiodes triphaenoides Walker, 1858; Ophiodes cuprea Moore, 1867; Ophiusa cuprea (Moore, 1867)

= Ophiusa triphaenoides =

Species of moth

Ophiusa triphaenoides is a moth of the family Erebidae. It is found from the Indian subregion to China, Taiwan, Thailand, Burma, Sumatra and Borneo. It has also been recorded from Palau.

The larvae feed on Terminalia, Shorea, Syzygium and Pinus species.
