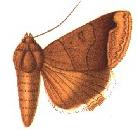

Scientific classification
- Kingdom: Animalia
- Phylum: Arthropoda
- Class: Insecta
- Order: Lepidoptera
- Superfamily: Noctuoidea
- Family: Erebidae
- Genus: Ophiusa
- Species: O. tumidilinea

Binomial name
- Ophiusa tumidilinea Walker, 1858

Synonyms
- Anua tumidilinea (Walker, 1858)

= Ophiusa tumidilinea =

Species of moth

Ophiusa tumidilinea is a moth of the family Erebidae first described by Francis Walker in 1858. It is found in Asia, including India and Thailand.
