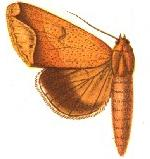

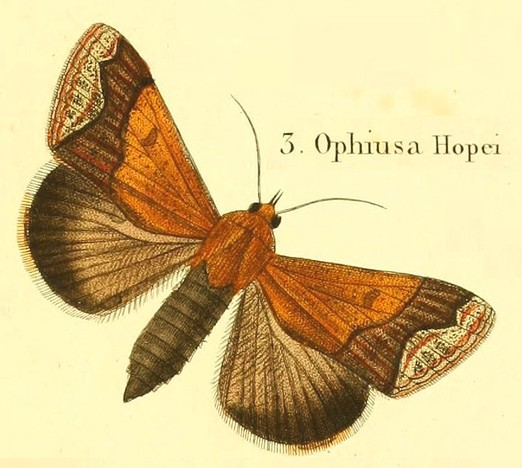

Scientific classification
- Kingdom: Animalia
- Phylum: Arthropoda
- Class: Insecta
- Order: Lepidoptera
- Superfamily: Noctuoidea
- Family: Erebidae
- Genus: Ophiusa
- Species: O. hopei

Binomial name
- Ophiusa hopei Boisduval, 1833

Synonyms
- Anua hopei (Boisduval, 1833)

= Ophiusa hopei =

Species of moth

Ophiusa hopei is a moth of the family Erebidae. It is endemic to Madagascar.
