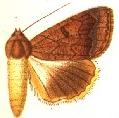

Scientific classification
- Kingdom: Animalia
- Phylum: Arthropoda
- Class: Insecta
- Order: Lepidoptera
- Superfamily: Noctuoidea
- Family: Erebidae
- Genus: Ophiusa
- Species: O. dilecta

Binomial name
- Ophiusa dilecta Walker, 1865

Synonyms
- Anua dilecta (Walker, 1865)

= Ophiusa dilecta =

Species of moth

Ophiusa dilecta is a moth of the family Erebidae. It is found in Africa, including Sierra Leone, Príncipe and South Africa.
