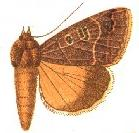

Scientific classification
- Kingdom: Animalia
- Phylum: Arthropoda
- Class: Insecta
- Order: Lepidoptera
- Superfamily: Noctuoidea
- Family: Erebidae
- Genus: Ophiusa
- Species: O. melaconisia

Binomial name
- Ophiusa melaconisia Hampson, 1905

Synonyms
- Anua melaconisia (Hampson, 1905)

= Ophiusa melaconisia =

Species of moth

Ophiusa melaconisia is a moth of the family Erebidae. It is found in Africa, including Zimbabwe and South Africa.
