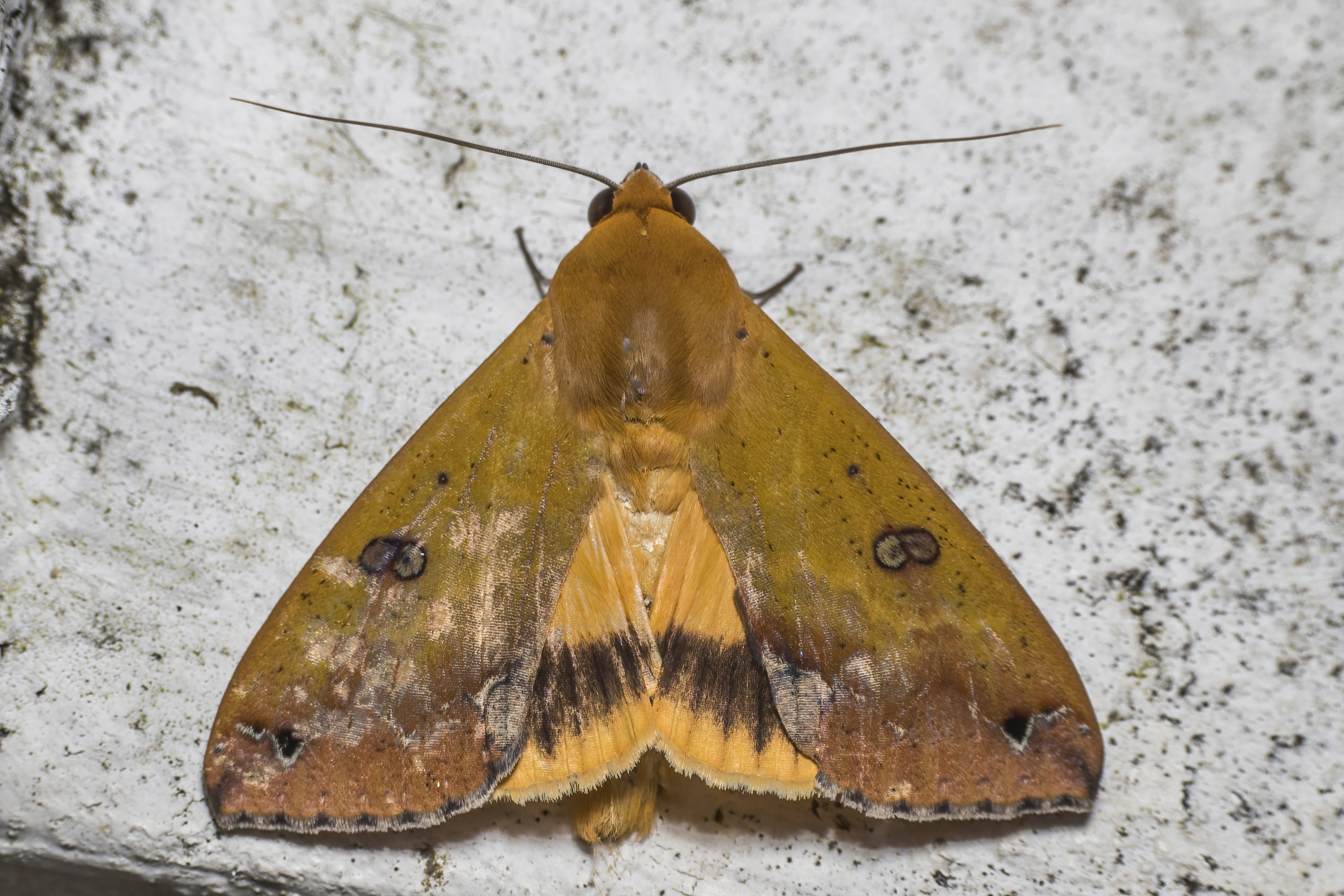
- In Sri Lanka

Scientific classification
- Kingdom: Animalia
- Phylum: Arthropoda
- Class: Insecta
- Order: Lepidoptera
- Superfamily: Noctuoidea
- Family: Erebidae
- Genus: Ophiusa
- Species: O. discriminans

Binomial name
- Ophiusa discriminans (Walker, 1858)

Synonyms
- Anua intacta Hampson, 1913; Anua keyensis Strand, 1913; Anua keyensis Gaede, 1938; Ophiusa intacta (Hampson, 1913); Ophiodes discriminans Walker, 1858; Pseudophila pygospila (Snellen, 1880); Pseudophia pygospila Snellen, 1880; Ophiusa pygospila (Snellen, 1880); Ophiusa sublutea Bethune-Baker, 1906; Anua sublutea (Bethune-Baker, 1906)

= Ophiusa discriminans =

Species of moth

Ophiusa discriminans is a moth of the family Erebidae first described by Francis Walker in 1858. It is found in Brunei, New Caledonia, New Guinea, Sri Lanka, Thailand and in Australia in the Northern Territory and Queensland.

The larvae feed on Melaleuca species.

== Subspecies ==
- Ophiusa discriminans discriminans
- Ophiusa discriminans sublutea (New Guinea)

== Gallery ==
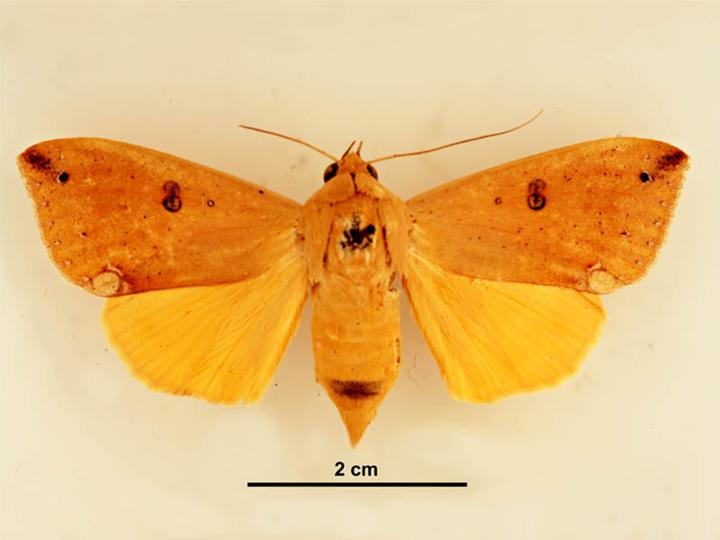
Female, dorsal view

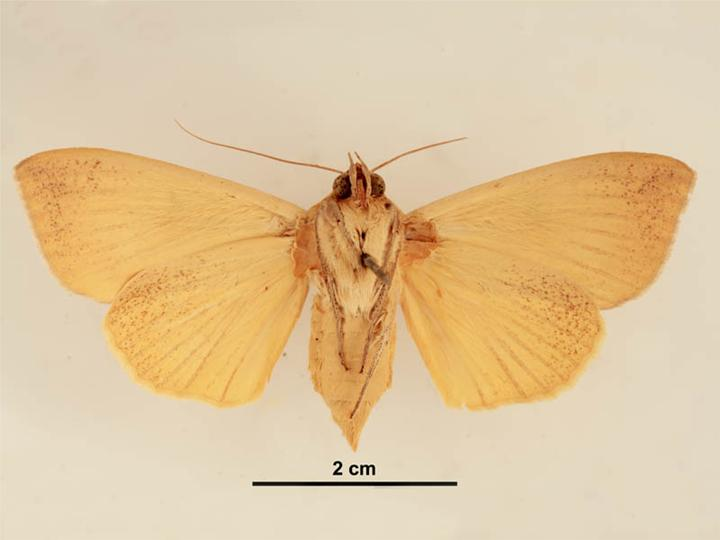
Female, ventral view

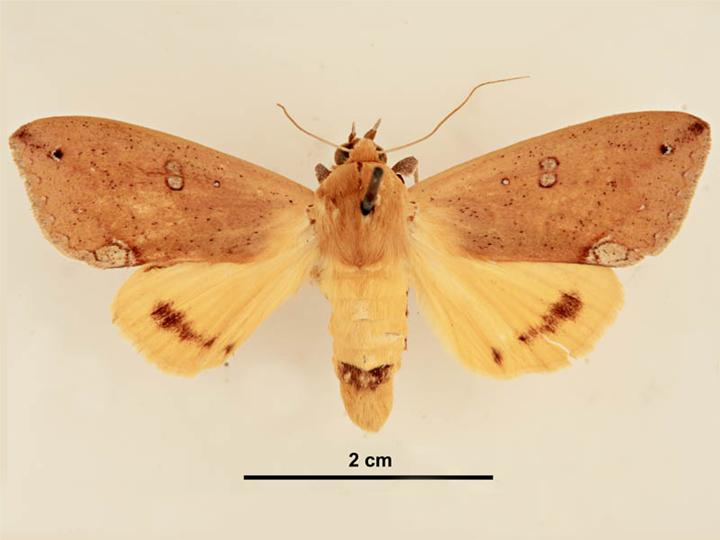
Male, dorsal view

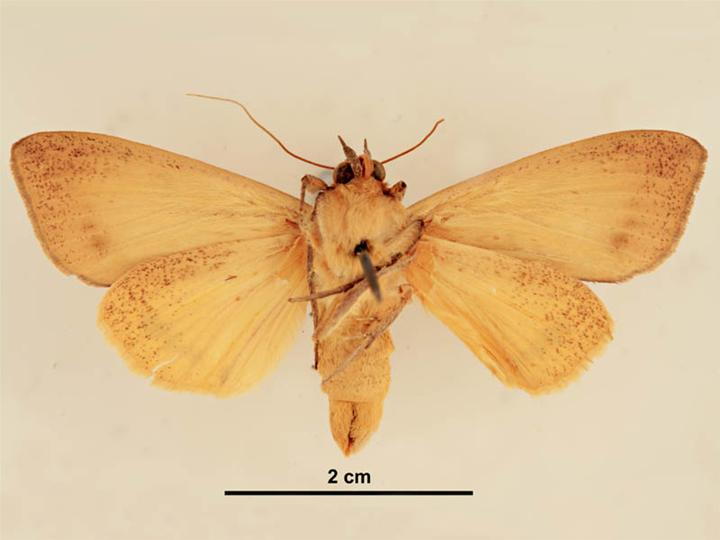
Male, ventral view
