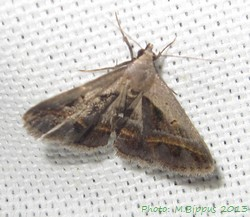
- Acantholipes trimeni

Scientific classification
- Kingdom: Animalia
- Phylum: Arthropoda
- Clade: Pancrustacea
- Class: Insecta
- Order: Lepidoptera
- Superfamily: Noctuoidea
- Family: Erebidae
- Tribe: Acantholipini
- Genus: Acantholipes; Lederer, 1857

Synonyms
- Docela Walker, 1866; Isatoolna Nye, 1975; Lasionota Warren, 1912; Nolaseniola Strand, 1920

= Acantholipes =

Genus of moths

Acantholipes is a genus of moths in the family Erebidae erected by Julius Lederer in 1857.

== Description ==
Palpi obliquely upturned, where the second joint very broadly fringed with hair and a minute third joint. Thorax and abdomen smoothly scaled and slender. Tibia spineless and no long hairs. Forewings with quadrate or slightly acute apex.

== Species ==
- Acantholipes acephala Strand, 1912
- Acantholipes afar Laporte, 1991
- Acantholipes aurea Berio, 1966
- Acantholipes canofusca Hacker & Saldaitis, 2010
- Acantholipes circumdata (Walker, 1858) (or Acantholipes circumdatus)
- Acantholipes curvilinea Leech, 1900
- Acantholipes germainae Laporte, 1991
- Acantholipes hypenoides Moore, 1881
- Acantholipes juba Swinhoe, 1902
- Acantholipes larentioides Strand, 1920
- Acantholipes namacensis (Guenée, 1852)
- Acantholipes plecopteroides Strand, 1920
- Acantholipes plumbeonitens Hampson, 1926
- Acantholipes regularis (Hübner, [1813])
- Acantholipes regulatrix Wiltshire, 1961
- Acantholipes semiaurea Berio, 1966
- Acantholipes similis Moore, 1879
- Acantholipes singularis Gerasimov, 1931
- Acantholipes tenuipoda Strand, 1920
- Acantholipes trajecta Walker, 1865
- Acantholipes transiens Berio, 1955
- Acantholipes trimeni Felder & Rogenhofer, 1874
- Acantholipes zuboides (Montague, 1914)

== Former species ==
- Acantholipes mesoscota Hampson, 1904
