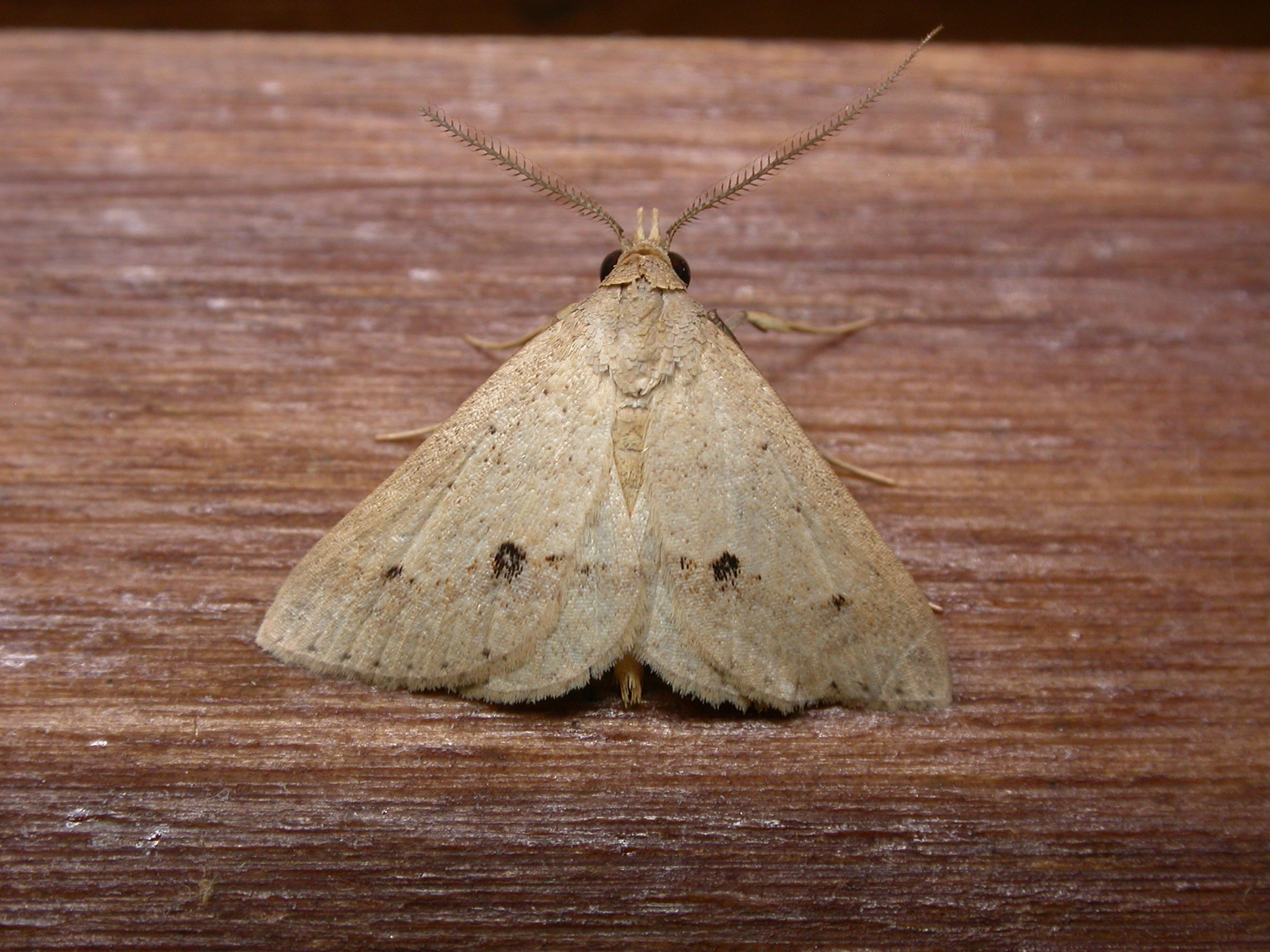
- Gesonia obeditalis

Scientific classification
- Kingdom: Animalia
- Phylum: Arthropoda
- Class: Insecta
- Order: Lepidoptera
- Superfamily: Noctuoidea
- Family: Erebidae
- Subfamily: Calpinae
- Genus: Gesonia; Walker, [1859]

Synonyms
- Amblygoes Butler, 1879; Apphadana Walker, 1866; Dragana Walker, 1859; Hileia Walker, 1862; Maresia Walker, 1866

= Gesonia =

Genus of moths

Gesonia is a genus of moths of the family Erebidae erected by Francis Walker in 1859.

== Species ==
- Gesonia dinawa (Bethune-Baker, 1906)
- Gesonia elongalis (Viette, 1954)
- Gesonia gemma Swinhoe, 1885
- Gesonia grisea Wileman & West, 1928
- Gesonia holochrysa (Meyrick, 1902)
- Gesonia inscitia (Swinhoe, 1885)
- Gesonia irrorata (Bethune-Baker, 1908)
- Gesonia mesoscota (Hampson, 1904)
- Gesonia nigripalpa Wiltshire, 1977
- Gesonia obeditalis Walker, [1859]
- Gesonia silvestralis Viette, 1956
- Gesonia stictigramma Hampson, 1926
- Gesonia thermesina Hampson, 1926
