= Acantholipes juba =

Scientific classification
- Domain: Eukaryota
- Kingdom: Animalia
- Phylum: Arthropoda
- Class: Insecta
- Order: Lepidoptera
- Superfamily: Noctuoidea
- Family: Erebidae
- Genus: Acantholipes
- Species: A. juba

Binomial name
- Acantholipes juba Swinhoe, 1902

Synonyms
- Melioptis juba Swinhoe, 1902

Species of moth

Acantholipes juba is a species of moth in the family Erebidae. It is found in Australia, where it has been recorded from Queensland and the Northern Territory.

The wingspan is about 20 mm. The wings are blotchy brown, with a pale-edged submarginal line on the forewings.
