= Acantholipes semiaurea =

Scientific classification
- Domain: Eukaryota
- Kingdom: Animalia
- Phylum: Arthropoda
- Class: Insecta
- Order: Lepidoptera
- Superfamily: Noctuoidea
- Family: Erebidae
- Genus: Acantholipes
- Species: A. semiaurea

Binomial name
- Acantholipes semiaurea Berio, 1966

Synonyms
- Acantholipes semiaureus Berio 1966

Species of moth

Acantholipes semiaurea is a species of moth in the family Erebidae. It is found in Senegal.
