= Acantholipes transiens =

Scientific classification
- Domain: Eukaryota
- Kingdom: Animalia
- Phylum: Arthropoda
- Class: Insecta
- Order: Lepidoptera
- Superfamily: Noctuoidea
- Family: Erebidae
- Genus: Acantholipes
- Species: A. transiens

Binomial name
- Acantholipes transiens Berio, 1956

Species of moth

Acantholipes transiens is a species of moth in the family Erebidae. It is found in Madagascar and Tanzania.
