= Acantholipes curvilinea =

Scientific classification
- Domain: Eukaryota
- Kingdom: Animalia
- Phylum: Arthropoda
- Class: Insecta
- Order: Lepidoptera
- Superfamily: Noctuoidea
- Family: Erebidae
- Genus: Acantholipes
- Species: A. curvilinea

Binomial name
- Acantholipes curvilinea Leech, 1900

Species of moth

Acantholipes curvilinea is a species of moth in the family Erebidae. It is found in western China.

The wingspan is about 34 mm. The forewings are leaden-grey with blackish ante- and postmedial lines. The first is slightly oblique and the second band-like and incurved below the cell. The submarginal line is vinous-brown, edged with fuscous, slightly curved and followed by three patches of black. The reniform stigma is lunular and the orbicular is punctiform. Both are black. The hindwings are fuscous-grey with a darker medial line, and a dark edged ochreous-brown submarginal band, the space between the band and line is leaden-grey. Adults have been recorded on wing in June.
