= Acantholipes plecopteroides =

Scientific classification
- Domain: Eukaryota
- Kingdom: Animalia
- Phylum: Arthropoda
- Class: Insecta
- Order: Lepidoptera
- Superfamily: Noctuoidea
- Family: Erebidae
- Genus: Acantholipes
- Species: A. plecopteroides

Binomial name
- Acantholipes plecopteroides Strand, 1920

Synonyms
- Nolaseniola plecopteroides

Species of moth

Acantholipes plecopteroides is a species of moth in the family Erebidae. It is found in Taiwan.
