= Acantholipes trajecta =

Scientific classification
- Kingdom: Animalia
- Phylum: Arthropoda
- Clade: Pancrustacea
- Class: Insecta
- Order: Lepidoptera
- Superfamily: Noctuoidea
- Family: Erebidae
- Genus: Acantholipes
- Species: A. trajecta

Binomial name
- Acantholipes trajecta (Walker, 1865)

Synonyms
- Euclidia trajecta Walker, 1865; Acantholipes trajectus (Walker, 1865); Acantholipes inconspicuus Butler, 1880; Acantholipes trifasciatus Moore, 1885

Species of moth

Acantholipes trajecta is a species of moth in the family Erebidae. It was described by Francis Walker in 1865. It is found in South Africa, India, Sri Lanka, Taiwan, and Australia (Western Australia, the Northern Territory, and Queensland).

== Description ==
The colouration is dark leaden-grey. The forewing has an oblique antemedial line from the cell to the inner margin. A red-brown band runs from the apex. The medial band of the hindwing is red-brown and narrow. The wingspan is about 28 mm.
