= Acantholipes zuboides =

Scientific classification
- Kingdom: Animalia
- Phylum: Arthropoda
- Clade: Pancrustacea
- Class: Insecta
- Order: Lepidoptera
- Superfamily: Noctuoidea
- Family: Erebidae
- Genus: Acantholipes
- Species: A. zuboides

Binomial name
- Acantholipes zuboides (Montague, 1914)

Synonyms
- Anumeta zuboides Montague, 1914

Species of moth

Acantholipes zuboides is a species of moth in the family Erebidae. It is found in Australia, where it has been recorded from the Montebello Islands.
