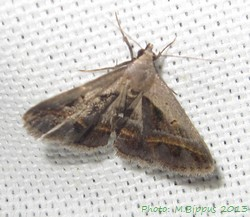

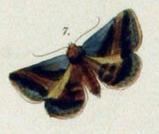

Scientific classification
- Kingdom: Animalia
- Phylum: Arthropoda
- Clade: Pancrustacea
- Class: Insecta
- Order: Lepidoptera
- Superfamily: Noctuoidea
- Family: Erebidae
- Genus: Acantholipes
- Species: A. trimeni

Binomial name
- Acantholipes trimeni Felder & Rogenhofer, 1874

= Acantholipes trimeni =

Species of moth

Acantholipes trimeni, or Trimen's knob, is a species of moth in the family Erebidae. The species is found in various countries of subtropical Africa.
