= Acantholipes plumbeonitens =

Scientific classification
- Kingdom: Animalia
- Phylum: Arthropoda
- Class: Insecta
- Order: Lepidoptera
- Superfamily: Noctuoidea
- Family: Erebidae
- Genus: Acantholipes
- Species: A. plumbeonitens

Binomial name
- Acantholipes plumbeonitens Hampson, 1926

Species of moth

Acantholipes plumbeonitens is a species of moth in the family Erebidae. It is found in Angola.
