= Acantholipes aurea =

Scientific classification
- Kingdom: Animalia
- Phylum: Arthropoda
- Class: Insecta
- Order: Lepidoptera
- Superfamily: Noctuoidea
- Family: Erebidae
- Genus: Acantholipes
- Species: A. aurea

Binomial name
- Acantholipes aurea Berio, 1966

Synonyms
- Acantholipes aureus Berio 1966

Species of moth

Acantholipes aurea is a species of moth in the family Erebidae. It is found in Cape Verde, Saudi Arabia, Senegal, and Yemen.
