= Acantholipes germainae =

Scientific classification
- Domain: Eukaryota
- Kingdom: Animalia
- Phylum: Arthropoda
- Class: Insecta
- Order: Lepidoptera
- Superfamily: Noctuoidea
- Family: Erebidae
- Genus: Acantholipes
- Species: A. germainae

Binomial name
- Acantholipes germainae Laporte, 1991

Species of moth

Acantholipes germainae is a species of moth in the family Erebidae. It is found in Djibouti.
