= Acantholipes hypenoides =

Scientific classification
- Domain: Eukaryota
- Kingdom: Animalia
- Phylum: Arthropoda
- Class: Insecta
- Order: Lepidoptera
- Superfamily: Noctuoidea
- Family: Erebidae
- Genus: Acantholipes
- Species: A. hypenoides

Binomial name
- Acantholipes hypenoides Moore, 1881

Synonyms
- Rivula magniplaga Swinhoe 1905

Species of moth

Acantholipes hypenoides is a species of moth in the family Erebidae. It is found in India (Khasia Hills, Darjeeling).

The forewings are greyish ochreous-brown, covered with dark-brown speckles and with a transverse lower discal blackish-brown band, which is broadest in females. This band is bordered outwardly by a slender yellowish line, indistinctly angled at its upper end and bent inward to the costa. There is a dark-brown waved fascia below the apex and the outer margin has a pale line below the apex, as well as some pale speckles at the end of the costa. The hindwings are pale ochreous-brown.
