= Acantholipes namacensis =

Scientific classification
- Domain: Eukaryota
- Kingdom: Animalia
- Phylum: Arthropoda
- Class: Insecta
- Order: Lepidoptera
- Superfamily: Noctuoidea
- Family: Erebidae
- Genus: Acantholipes
- Species: A. namacensis

Binomial name
- Acantholipes namacensis (Guenée, 1852)

Synonyms
- Microphysa namacensis Guenée, 1852

Species of moth

Acantholipes namacensis is a species of moth in the family Erebidae. It is found in Angola, Ethiopia, Mozambique and South Africa.
