= Acantholipes singularis =

Scientific classification
- Domain: Eukaryota
- Kingdom: Animalia
- Phylum: Arthropoda
- Class: Insecta
- Order: Lepidoptera
- Superfamily: Noctuoidea
- Family: Erebidae
- Genus: Acantholipes
- Species: A. singularis

Binomial name
- Acantholipes singularis Gerasimov, 1931

Species of moth

Acantholipes singularis is a species of moth in the family Erebidae. It is found in Uzbekistan.
