= Acantholipes acephala =

Scientific classification
- Kingdom: Animalia
- Phylum: Arthropoda
- Clade: Pancrustacea
- Class: Insecta
- Order: Lepidoptera
- Superfamily: Noctuoidea
- Family: Erebidae
- Genus: Acantholipes
- Species: A. acephala

Binomial name
- Acantholipes acephala Strand, 1912

Species of moth

Acantholipes acephala is a species of moth in the family Erebidae. It is found in the Democratic Republic of the Congo.
