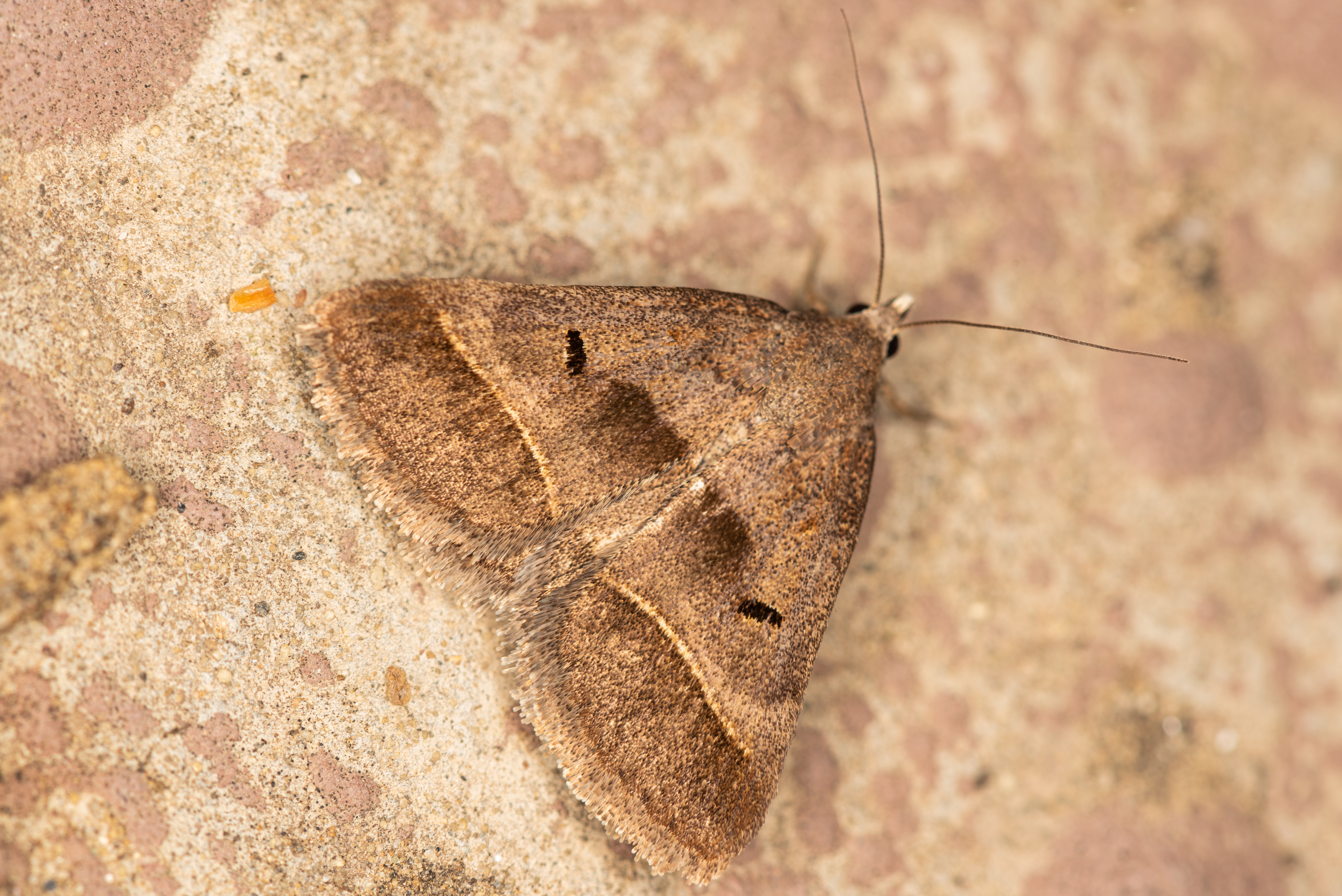

Scientific classification
- Kingdom: Animalia
- Phylum: Arthropoda
- Clade: Pancrustacea
- Class: Insecta
- Order: Lepidoptera
- Superfamily: Noctuoidea
- Family: Erebidae
- Genus: Acantholipes
- Species: A. regularis

Binomial name
- Acantholipes regularis (Hübner, 1813)

Synonyms
- Noctua regularis Hübner, 1813

= Acantholipes regularis =

Species of moth

Acantholipes regularis is a species of moth in the family Erebidae first described by Jacob Hübner in 1813. It is found in southern Europe, the Near East and Middle East, western China, Afghanistan, Iran and Saudi Arabia.

There are two generations per year. Adults are on wing from April to May and September.

The larvae feed on Glycyrrhiza glabra.

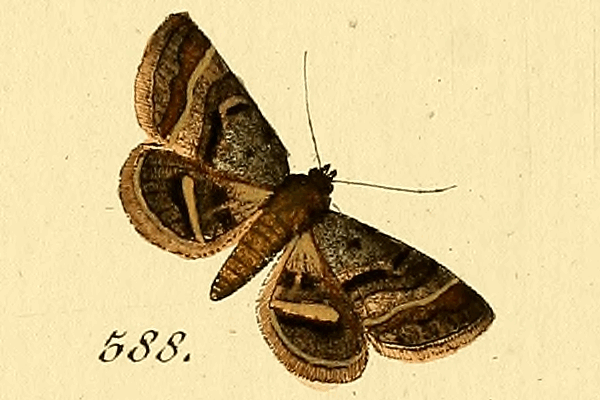
