= Acantholipes canofusca =

Scientific classification
- Kingdom: Animalia
- Phylum: Arthropoda
- Clade: Pancrustacea
- Class: Insecta
- Order: Lepidoptera
- Superfamily: Noctuoidea
- Family: Erebidae
- Genus: Acantholipes
- Species: A. canofusca

Binomial name
- Acantholipes canofusca Hacker & Saldaitis, 2010

Species of moth

Acantholipes canofusca is a species of moth in the family Erebidae first described by Hermann Heinrich Hacker and Aidas Saldaitis in 2010. It is found on Socotra, an island off Yemen.
