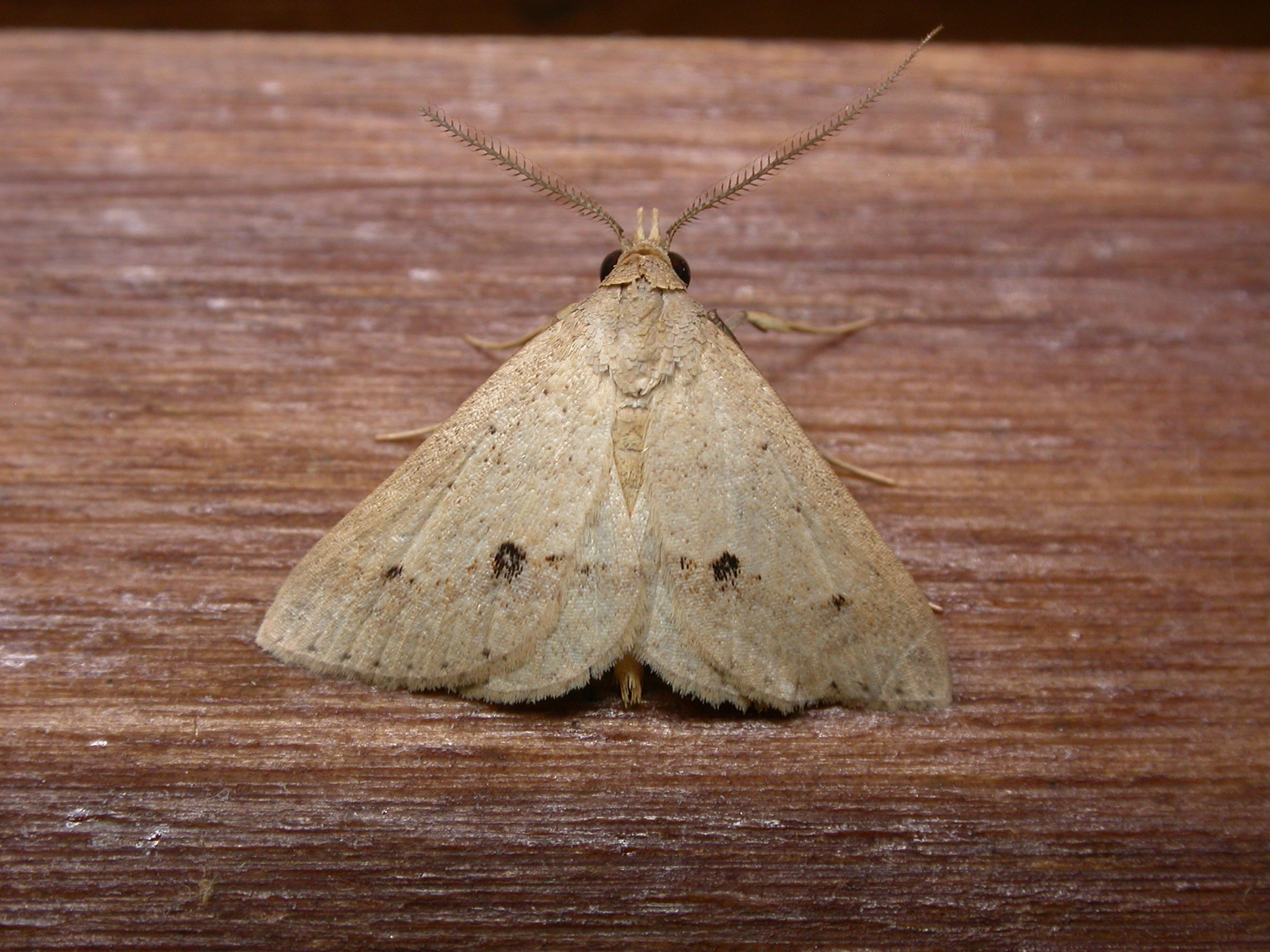

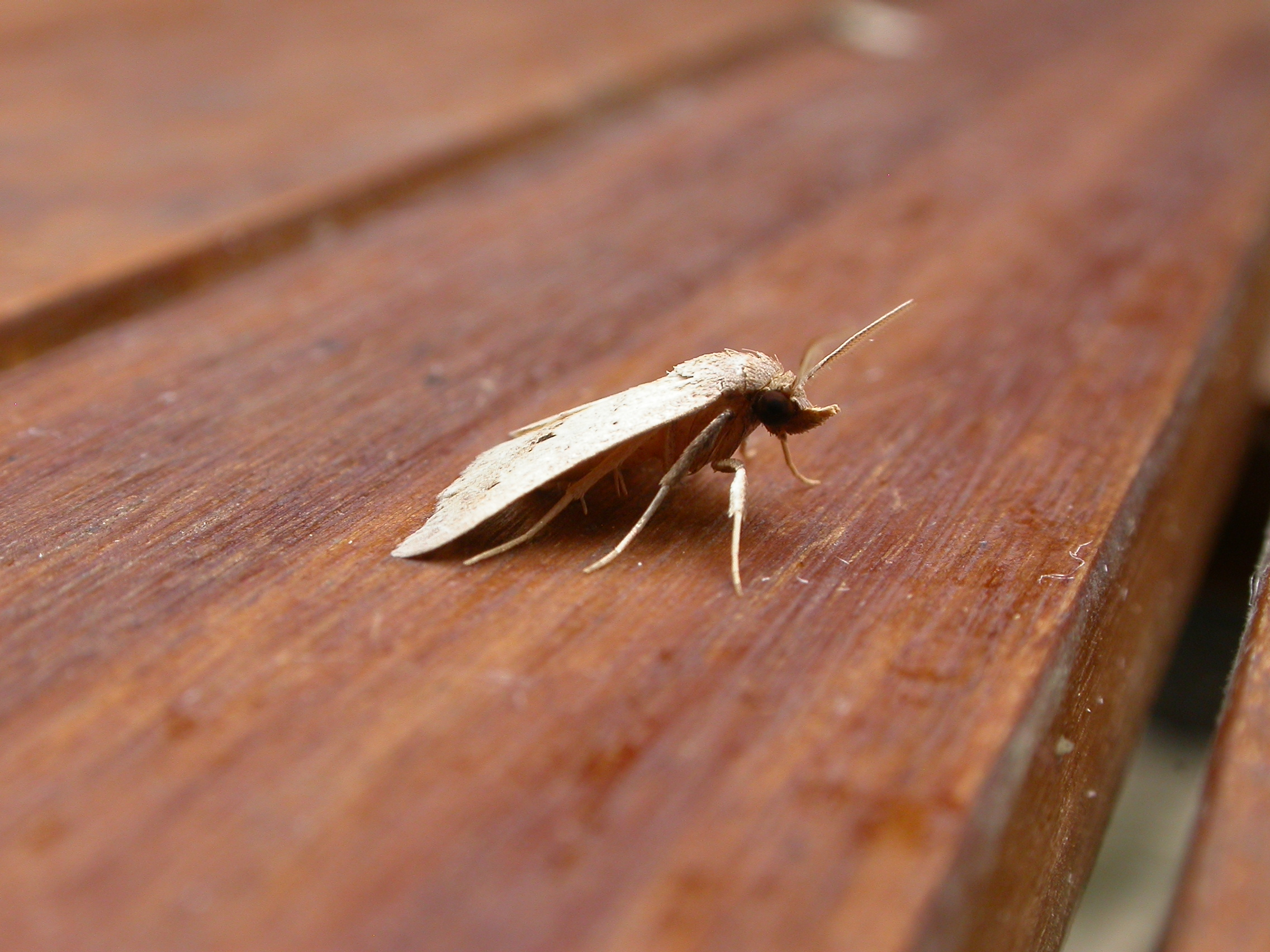

Scientific classification
- Kingdom: Animalia
- Phylum: Arthropoda
- Class: Insecta
- Order: Lepidoptera
- Superfamily: Noctuoidea
- Family: Erebidae
- Genus: Gesonia
- Species: G. obeditalis

Binomial name
- Gesonia obeditalis Walker, [1859]

Synonyms
- Dragana pansalis Walker, [1859]; Gesonia secundalis Walker, [1859]; Hileia crambisata Walker, 1862; Apphadana evulsalis Walker, [1866]; Maresia binotata Walker, 1866; Poaphila concors Walker, 1866; Rivula terrosa Snellen, 1872; Apphadana rubicundula Swinhoe, 1885; Apphadana rusticula Swinhoe, 1885; Apphadana nigrofusca Swinhoe, 1885; Apphadana festina Swinhoe, 1885

= Gesonia obeditalis =

Species of moth

Gesonia obeditalis is a species of moth of the family Noctuidae first described by Francis Walker in 1859. It is found from eastern Africa, the Seychelles, the Maldives and the Oriental tropics of India, Myanmar, Sri Lanka east to the Philippines, the Sula Islands and Australia. The adult moth has brown wings with a scalloped dark brown band near the margin. The hindwings are similar in pattern to the forewings but are a paler shade of brown.

== Description ==
The wingspan is about 22–24 mm (0.87–0.94 in). Antennae of male serrate and fasciculated. Body fuscous or rufous brown. Palpi chocolate at sides. Forewings with traces of antemedial and postmedial waved lines, where postmedial line curved inwards below cell. There are traces of specks in and at end of cell. An obliquely sinuous postmedial pale line found with rufous diffused on its outer edge with a marginal dark specks series. Hindwings with postmedial line developed towards inner margin. A marginal series of dark specks present. Traces of medial and submarginal lines can be seen. Some specimens have a dark spot beyond the postmedial line of forewings at middle, and another above inner margin. Some has ochreous ground color in forewings as far as submarginal line and another has color between antemedial and postmedial line fuscous black.

== Life cycle ==
The larvae feed on Gramineae (grass) species, as well as Stylosanthes species. Two pairs of prolegs are missing so the caterpillar moves by looping.
