= Acantholipes circumdata =

Scientific classification
- Kingdom: Animalia
- Phylum: Arthropoda
- Class: Insecta
- Order: Lepidoptera
- Superfamily: Noctuoidea
- Family: Erebidae
- Genus: Acantholipes
- Species: A. circumdata

Binomial name
- Acantholipes circumdata Walker, 1858

Synonyms
- Docela affinis Butler, 1880; Acantholipes flavisigna Moore, 1881; Acantholipes nigrisigna Moore, 1881; Docela vetustalis Walker 1866; Acantholipes circumdatus (Walker, 1858)

Species of moth

Acantholipes circumdata is a species of moth in the family Erebidae first described by Francis Walker in 1858. It is found from India and Pakistan through Afghanistan and Iran to the Arabian Peninsula and eastern Africa.

There are multiple generations per year.

The larvae feed on Taverniera spartea.
