= Acantholipes regulatrix =

Scientific classification
- Kingdom: Animalia
- Phylum: Arthropoda
- Class: Insecta
- Order: Lepidoptera
- Superfamily: Noctuoidea
- Family: Erebidae
- Genus: Acantholipes
- Species: A. regulatrix

Binomial name
- Acantholipes regulatrix Wiltshire, 1961

Species of moth

Acantholipes regulatrix is a species of moth in the family Erebidae. It is found in Afghanistan.
