= Gesonia mesoscota =

Scientific classification
- Kingdom: Animalia
- Phylum: Arthropoda
- Class: Insecta
- Order: Lepidoptera
- Superfamily: Noctuoidea
- Family: Erebidae
- Genus: Gesonia
- Species: G. mesoscota

Binomial name
- Gesonia mesoscota (Hampson, 1904)

Synonyms
- Acantholipes mesoscota Hampson, 1904

Species of moth

Gesonia mesoscota is a species of moth in the family Erebidae. It is found on the Bahamas.
