= List of moths of Australia (Noctuidae) =

Partial list of Australian moths

This is a list of the Australian moth species of the family Noctuidae. It also acts as an index to the species articles and forms part of the full List of moths of Australia.

== Acontiinae ==
- Acontia clerana (Lower, 1902)
- Acontia crocata Guenée, 1852
- Acontia detrita Butler, 1886
- Acontia elaeoa (Hampson, 1910)
- Acontia nivipicta Butler, 1886
- Acontia thapsina (Turner, 1902)
- Alypophanes iridocosma Turner, 1908
- Amyna apicalis (Walker, 1865)
- Amyna apicipuncta (Turner, 1936)
- Amyna auriculata (Turner, 1903)
- Amyna axis (Guenée, 1852)
- Amyna natalis (Walker, 1859)
- Amyna onthodes (Lower, 1903)
- Amyna punctum (Fabricius, 1794)
- Araeopteron canescens (Walker, 1866)
- Araeopteron epiphracta (Turner, 1902)
- Araeopteron imbecilla (Turner, 1933)
- Araeopteron micraeola (Meyrick, 1902)
- Araeopteron microclyta (Turner, 1920)
- Araeopteron pleurotypa (Turner, 1902)
- Araeopteron poliobapta (Turner, 1925)
- Autoba abrupta (Walker, 1865)
- Autoba crassiuscula (Walker, 1864)
- Autoba dispar Warren, 1913
- Autoba latericolor (Turner, 1945)
- Autoba loxotoma (Turner, 1909)
- Autoba pectorora (T.P. Lucas, 1895)
- Autoba quadrapex (Hampson, 1891)
- Autoba rubra (Hampson, 1902)
- Autoba silicula (Swinhoe, 1897)
- Autoba sphragidota (Turner, 1902)
- Autoba undilinea Warren, 1913
- Autoba versicolor Walker, 1864
- Carmara subcervina Walker, 1863
- Cerynea trogobasis Hampson, 1910
- Chaograptis crystallodes Meyrick, 1902
- Chaograptis euchrysa (Lower, 1903)
- Chaograptis rhaptina (Turner, 1904)
- Clytoscopa iorrhoda Turner, 1931
- Clytoscopa serena Turner, 1931
- Coccidiphaga scitula (Rambur, 1833)
- Cophanta funestalis Walker, 1864
- Corgatha ancistrodes Turner, 1936
- Corgatha dichionistis Turner, 1902
- Corgatha dipyra Turner, 1902
- Corgatha drosera (Meyrick, 1891)
- Corgatha figuralis (Walker, 1866)
- Corgatha miltophyres Turner, 1920
- Corgatha minuta (Bethune-Baker, 1906)
- Corgatha molybdophaes Turner, 1936
- Corgatha ochrobapta Turner, 1941
- Corgatha omopis (Meyrick, 1902)
- Corgatha pleuroplaca Turner, 1936
- Corgatha semipardata (Walker, 1861)
- Corgatha sideropasta (Turner, 1936)
- Decticryptis deleta (Moore, 1885)
- Diastema tigris Guenée, 1852
- Ecnomia hesychima Turner, 1936
- Enispa daphoena (Hampson, 1910)
- Enispa niviceps (Turner, 1909)
- Enispa parva (Bethune-Baker, 1906)
- Enispa phaeopa Turner, 1945
- Enispa prolectus (Turner, 1908)
- Enispa rhodopleura Turner, 1945
- Enispa violacea (T.P. Lucas, 1894)
- Epopsima fasciolata (Butler, 1886)
- Eublemma anachoresis (Wallengren, 1863)
- Eublemma cochylioides (Guenée, 1852)
- Eublemma dimidialis (Fabricius, 1794)
- Eublemma inconspicua (Walker, 1865)
- Eublemma innocens (Butler, 1886)
- Eublemma leucodesma (Lower, 1899)
- Eublemma lozostropha Turner, 1902
- Eublemma marmaropa Meyrick, 1902
- Eublemma nymphodora Meyrick, 1902
- Eublemma pudica (Snellen, 1880)
- Eublemma ragusana (Freyer, 1845)
- Eublemma rivula (Moore, 1882)
- Eublemma roseana (Moore, 1881)
- Eublemma rufipuncta Turner, 1902
- Eublemma vestalis (Butler, 1886)
- Eugatha thermochroa Hampson, 1911
- Eulocastra fasciata Butler, 1886
- Eulocastra tripartita (Butler, 1886)
- Eustrotia papuensis Warren, 1913
- Habrophyes xuthosoma (Turner, 1909)
- Haplopseustis erythrias Meyrick, 1902
- Heterorta plutonis (T.P. Lucas, 1895)
- Himerois angustitaenia (Warren, 1913)
- Himerois basiscripta (Warren, 1913)
- Himerois periphaea Turner, 1920
- Himerois thiochroa Turner, 1902
- Himerois univittata (Pagenstecher, 1900)
- Holocryptis phasianura T.P. Lucas, 1892
- Hypobleta cymaea Turner, 1908
- Hyposada addescens (Swinhoe, 1901)
- Hyposada aspersa (Turner, 1945)
- Hyposada hydrocampata (Guenée, 1857)
- Hyposada postvittata (Moore, 1887)
- Lacistophanes hackeri Turner, 1947
- Maliattha amorpha (Butler, 1886)
- Maliattha ferrugina Turner, 1908
- Maliattha ritsemae (Snellen, 1880)
- Maliattha signifera (Walker, 1858)
- Mataeomera acrosticha (Turner, 1920)
- Mataeomera anaemacta (Turner, 1920)
- Mataeomera brevipalpis (Turner, 1945)
- Mataeomera coccophaga (Meyrick, 1887)
- Mataeomera dubia Butler, 1886
- Mataeomera ligata (T.P. Lucas, 1895)
- Mataeomera mesotaenia (Turner, 1929)
- Mataeomera porphyris (Turner, 1920)
- Mataeomera punctilinea (Turner, 1945)
- Metachrostis paurograpta Butler, 1886
- Metasada polycesta (Turner, 1902)
- Micraeschus rufipallens Warren, 1913
- Micrapatetis icela Turner, 1920
- Micrapatetis leucozona (Turner, 1902)
- Micrapatetis orthozona Meyrick, 1897
- Microedma extorris Warren, 1913
- Mimasura albiceris (Turner, 1903)
- Narangodes nigridiscata (Swinhoe, 1901)
- Oruza cervinipennis Warren, 1913
- Oruza crocodeta (Turner, 1903)
- Ozarba chrysaspis (Meyrick, 1891)
- Ozarba punctigera Walker, 1865
- Parerastria castaneata Warren, 1914
- Peperita molybdopasta (Turner, 1908)
- Pseudcraspedia puntata Hampson, 1898
- Pseudephyra straminea Butler, 1886
- Pseudozarba hemiplaca (Meyrick, 1902)
- Pseudozarba orthopetes (Meyrick, 1897)
- Pyripnoa auricularia (T.P. Lucas, 1895)
- Pyripnoa pyraspis (Meyrick, 1891)
- Pyripnoa sciaptera (Lower, 1903)
- Sophta concavata Walker, 1863
- Sophta hapalopis Turner, 1925
- Sophta poecilota (Turner, 1908)
- Tabomeeres dolera (Turner, 1939)
- Technemon epichares Turner, 1945
- Thaumasiodes eurymitra Turner, 1939
- Trissernis ochrochlora (Turner, 1902)
- Trissernis prasinoscia Meyrick, 1902
- Vescisa digona (Hampson, 1910)
- Xanthograpta glycychroa (Turner, 1904)
- Xanthograpta purpurascens (Hampson, 1910)
- Xenopseustis poecilastis Meyrick, 1897

The following species belongs to the subfamily Acontiinae, but have not been assigned to a genus yet. Given here is the original name given to the species when it was first described:

- Micrapatetis albiviata Hampson, 1910
- Eublemma amphidasys Turner, 1933
- Tortrix apicana Donovan, 1805
- Sarrothripa baeopis Turner, 1906
- Oruza bipunctata Warren, 1913
- Thermesia cariosa T.P. Lucas, 1895
- Erastria clandestina Turner, 1909
- Eublemma eurynipha Turner, 1902
- Xenogenes eustrotiodes L.B. Prout, 1910
- Eublemma glaucochroa Turner, 1902
- Megalodes hedychroa Turner, 1904
- Eublemma iophaenna Turner, 1920
- Oruza leucostigma Turner, 1945
- Oruza lithochroma Turner, 1929
- Oruza megalospila Turner, 1933
- Erastria miasma Hampson, 1891
- Parasada molybdocolpa Turner, 1945
- Eulocastra phaeozona Hampson, 1910
- Eromene rosata Lower, 1894
- Selenis semilux Walker, 1865
- Zagira stragulata Pagenstecher, 1900
- Eulocastra thermozona Hampson, 1910

== Amphipyrinae ==
- Acrapex albicostata (Lower, 1905)
- Acrapex exsanguis Lower, 1902
- Acronicta dinawa (Bethune-Baker, 1906)
- Acronicta psorallina (Lower, 1903)
- Actinotia hyperici (Denis & Schiffermüller, 1775)
- Aedia arctipennis (Hulstaert, 1924)
- Aedia leucomelas (Linnaeus, 1758)
- Aedia olivescens (Guenée, 1852)
- Aedia sericea (Butler, 1882)
- Ancara plaesiosema Turner, 1943
- Athetis maculatra (Lower, 1902)
- Athetis reclusa (Walker, 1862)
- Athetis striolata (Butler, 1886)
- Athetis tenuis (Butler, 1886)
- Athetis thoracica (Moore, 1884)
- Aucha triphaenoides (Walker, 1865)
- Aucha vesta Swinhoe, 1901
- Bagada turpisoides (Poole, 1989)
- Barybela chionostigma Turner, 1944
- Bathytricha aethalion Turner, 1944
- Bathytricha leonina (Walker, 1865)
- Bathytricha monticola Turner, 1925
- Bathytricha phaeosticha Turner, 1931
- Bathytricha truncata (Walker, 1856)
- Borbotana nivifascia Walker, 1858
- Callopistria ferruginea (Hampson, 1908)
- Callopistria insularis Butler, 1882
- Callopistria maillardi (Guenée, 1862)
- Callopistria placodoides (Guenée, 1852)
- Callopistria rivularis Walker, 1858
- Callyna leuconota Lower, 1903
- Callyna leucosticha Turner, 1911
- Callyna monoleuca Walker, 1858
- Calophasidia cana (Turner, 1939)
- Calophasidia dentifera Hampson, 1909
- Calophasidia dichroa (Hampson, 1926)
- Calophasidia latens (Turner, 1929)
- Calophasidia lucala (Swinhoe, 1902)
- Calophasidia radiata (Swinhoe, 1902)
- Chasmina candida (Walker, 1865)
- Chasmina pulchra (Walker, 1858)
- Chasmina tenuilinea Hampson, 1910
- Chasmina tibialis (Fabricius, 1775)
- Condica aroana (Bethune-Baker, 1906)
- Condica dolorosa (Walker, 1865)
- Condica illecta (Walker, 1865)
- Condica praesecta (Warren, 1912)
- Condica sublucens (Warren, 1912)
- Cosmodes elegans (Donovan, 1805)
- Craniophora fasciata (Moore, 1884)
- Craniophora nodyna (Turner, 1904)
- Craniophora phaeocosma (Turner, 1920)
- Data aroa (Bethune-Baker, 1906)
- Data dissimilis Warren, 1911
- Data ochroneura (Turner, 1943)
- Data pratti (Bethune-Baker, 1906)
- Data thalpophiloides Walker, 1862
- Diplonephra ditata (T.P. Lucas, 1892)
- Dipterygina babooni (Bethune-Baker, 1906)
- Dipterygina kebeae (Bethune-Baker, 1906)
- Eccleta xuthophanes Turner, 1902
- Ecpatia dulcistriga (Walker, 1858)
- Ecpatia melas (Bethune-Baker, 1906)
- Epicyrtica bryistis (Turner, 1902)
- Epicyrtica docima (Turner, 1920)
- Epicyrtica hippolopha (Turner, 1936)
- Epicyrtica lathridia Turner, 1908
- Epicyrtica leucostigma (Turner, 1902)
- Epicyrtica lichenophora (Lower, 1902)
- Epicyrtica melanops (Lower, 1902)
- Epicyrtica metallica (T.P. Lucas, 1898)
- Epicyrtica oostigma (Turner, 1929)
- Epicyrtica pamprepta (Turner, 1922)
- Eremaula minor (Butler, 1886)
- Eremochroa alphitias Meyrick, 1897
- Eremochroa lunata (Lower, 1903)
- Eremochroa macropa (Lower, 1897)
- Eremochroa paradesma Lower, 1902
- Eremochroa psammias Meyrick, 1897
- Eremochroa thermidora Hampson, 1909
- Eucatephia dinawa (Bethune-Baker, 1906)
- Euryschema tricycla Turner, 1925
- Hypoperigea tonsa (Guenée, 1852)
- Lignispalta incertissima (Bethune-Baker, 1906)
- Lophocalama neuritis Hampson, 1910
- Lophocalama suffusa (T.P. Lucas, 1894)
- Musothyma cyanastis Meyrick, 1897
- Neumichtis adamantina (Turner, 1906)
- Neumichtis archephanes Turner, 1920
- Neumichtis callisina (Turner, 1902)
- Neumichtis expulsa (Guenée, 1852)
- Neumichtis iorrhoa (Meyrick, 1902)
- Neumichtis mesophaea (Hampson, 1906)
- Neumichtis nigerrima (Guenée, 1852)
- Neumichtis prolifera (Walker, 1856)
- Neumichtis saliaris (Guenée, 1852)
- Neumichtis sepultrix (Guenée, 1852)
- Neumichtis signata (Lower, 1905)
- Neumichtis spumigera (Guenée, 1852)
- Pachythrix hampsoni Nye, 1975
- Pachythrix mniochlora (Meyrick, 1889)
- Pansemna beryllodes (Turner, 1903)
- Paromphale caeca (Swinhoe, 1902)
- Platyprosopa nigrostrigata (Bethune-Baker, 1906)
- Prometopus inassueta Guenée, 1852
- Proteuxoa acontoura (Lower, 1915)
- Proteuxoa adelopa (Hampson, 1909)
- Proteuxoa adelphodes (Lower, 1902)
- Proteuxoa amaurodes (Lower, 1902)
- Proteuxoa angasi (R. Felder & Rogenhofer, 1874)
- Proteuxoa argonephra (Turner, 1931)
- Proteuxoa asbolaea (Turner, 1931)
- Proteuxoa atmoscopa (Lower, 1902)
- Proteuxoa atra (Guenée, 1852)
- Proteuxoa atrisquamata (Lower, 1902)
- Proteuxoa bistrigula (Walker, 1857)
- Proteuxoa callimera (Lower, 1897)
- Proteuxoa capularis (Guenée, 1852)
- Proteuxoa chrysospila (Lower, 1902)
- Proteuxoa cinereicollis (Guenée, 1852)
- Proteuxoa coelenoptera (Lower, 1915)
- Proteuxoa confinis (Walker, 1857)
- Proteuxoa cornuta (Lower, 1902)
- Proteuxoa cryphaea (Turner, 1908)
- Proteuxoa crypsicharis (Lower, 1902)
- Proteuxoa cyanoloma (Lower, 1902)
- Proteuxoa desertorum (Turner, 1944)
- Proteuxoa ebenodes (Turner, 1911)
- Proteuxoa epiplecta (Guenée, 1868)
- Proteuxoa euchroa (Lower, 1902)
- Proteuxoa eupolia (Turner, 1936)
- Proteuxoa flexirena (Walker, 1865)
- Proteuxoa florescens (Walker, 1857)
- Proteuxoa goniographa (Turner, 1943)
- Proteuxoa gypsina (Lower, 1897)
- Proteuxoa heliosema (Lower, 1902)
- Proteuxoa heterogama (Hampson, 1909)
- Proteuxoa hydraecioides (Guenée, 1852)
- Proteuxoa hypochalchis (Turner, 1902)
- Proteuxoa imparata (Walker, 1857)
- Proteuxoa instipata (Walker, 1857)
- Proteuxoa interferens (Walker, 1857)
- Proteuxoa leptochroa (Turner, 1925)
- Proteuxoa leucosticta (Turner, 1908)
- Proteuxoa marginalis (Walker, 1865)
- Proteuxoa melanographa (Turner, 1908)
- Proteuxoa melodora (Lower, 1902)
- Proteuxoa mesombra (Lower, 1893)
- Proteuxoa metableta (Turner, 1939)
- Proteuxoa metaneura (Lower, 1908)
- Proteuxoa microdes (Lower, 1902)
- Proteuxoa microspila (Lower, 1902)
- Proteuxoa monochroa (Lower, 1902)
- Proteuxoa nuna (Guenée, 1868)
- Proteuxoa nyctereutica (Turner, 1942)
- Proteuxoa nycteris (Turner, 1908)
- Proteuxoa nyctimesa (Hampson, 1911)
- Proteuxoa ochrias (Turner, 1911)
- Proteuxoa oxygona (Lower, 1902)
- Proteuxoa paragypsa (Lower, 1902)
- Proteuxoa paratorna (Lower, 1902)
- Proteuxoa passalota (Hampson, 1909)
- Proteuxoa petrodora (Lower, 1902)
- Proteuxoa pissonephra (Turner, 1939)
- Proteuxoa plaesiospila (Turner, 1939)
- Proteuxoa poliocrossa (Turner, 1903)
- Proteuxoa porphyrescens (Lower, 1902)
- Proteuxoa restituta (Guenée, 1852)
- Proteuxoa rhodocentra (Lower, 1902)
- Proteuxoa rubripuncta (Turner, 1933)
- Proteuxoa rufimaculis (Turner, 1943)
- Proteuxoa sanguinipuncta (Guenée, 1852)
- Proteuxoa sarcomorpha (Lower, 1902)
- Proteuxoa scotti (R. Felder & Rogenhofer, 1874)
- Proteuxoa senta (Lower, 1902)
- Proteuxoa spilocrossa (Turner, 1915)
- Proteuxoa spodias Turner, 1908
- Proteuxoa testaceicollis (Guenée, 1852)
- Proteuxoa tibiata (Guenée, 1852)
- Proteuxoa tortisigna (Walker, 1857)
- Proteuxoa typhlopa (Lower, 1900)
- Proteuxoa verecunda (Walker, 1858)
- Pseudoedaleosia scoparioides Strand, 1924
- Sasunaga apiciplaga Warren, 1912
- Sasunaga leucorina (Hampson, 1908)
- Sasunaga tenebrosa (Moore, 1867)
- Spodoptera apertura (Walker, 1865)
- Spodoptera exempta (Walker, 1857)
- Spodoptera exigua (Hübner, 1808)
- Spodoptera litura (Fabricius, 1775)
- Spodoptera mauritia (Boisduval, 1833)
- Spodoptera picta (Guérin-Méneville, 1831)
- Spodoptera umbraculata (Walker, 1858)
- Stenopterygia kebea (Bethune-Baker, 1906)
- Syntheta xylitis Turner, 1902
- Thalatha artificiosa Turner, 1936
- Thalatha bryochlora (Meyrick, 1897)
- Thalatha chionobola (Turner, 1941)
- Thalatha guttalis (Walker, 1866)
- Thalatha melaleuca Hampson, 1908
- Thalatha melanophrica Turner, 1922
- Thalatha symprepes (Turner, 1933)
- Thalatha trichroma (Meyrick, 1902)
- Thegalea haemorrhanta (Hampson, 1909)

The following species belongs to the subfamily Amphipyrinae, but have not been assigned to a genus yet. Given here is the original name given to the species when it was first described:

- Orthosia columbaris T.P. Lucas, 1894
- Orthosia cremnodes Lower, 1893
- Euprora crypsichlora Turner, 1931
- Perigea dinawa Bethune-Baker, 1906
- Stauropus euryscia Lower, 1903
- Nitocris limbosa Guenée, 1868
- Chasmina lispodes Turner, 1936
- Tringilburra lugens T.P. Lucas, 1901
- Xanthoptera macrosema Lower, 1903
- Euplexia polycmeta Turner, 1902

== Agaristinae ==
- Agarista agricola (Donovan, 1805)
- Agaristodes feisthamelii (Herrich-Schäffer, 1853)
- Apina callisto (Angas, 1847)
- Argyrolepidia aequalis (Walker, 1864)
- Argyrolepidia fractus (Rothschild, 1899)
- Argyrolepidia thoracophora (Turner, 1920)
- Burgena varia (Walker, 1854)
- Coenotoca subaspersa (Walker, 1865)
- Coenotoca unimacula (Lower, 1903)
- Comocrus behri (Angas, 1847)
- Cremnophora angasii (Angas, 1847)
- Cruria donowani (Boisduval, 1832)
- Cruria epicharita Turner, 1911
- Cruria kochii (W.J. Macleay, 1866)
- Cruria latifascia Jordan, 1912
- Cruria synopla Turner, 1903
- Cruria tropica (T.P. Lucas, 1891)
- Eutrichopidia latinus (Donovan, 1805)
- Hecatesia exultans Walker, 1865
- Hecatesia fenestrata Boisduval, 1828
- Hecatesia thyridion Feisthamel, 1839
- Idalima aethrias (Turner, 1908)
- Idalima affinis (Boisduval, 1832)
- Idalima leonora (Doubleday, 1846)
- Idalima metasticta Hampson, 1910
- Idalima tasso (Jordan, 1912)
- Ipanica cornigera (Butler, 1886)
- Leucogonia cosmopis (Lower, 1897)
- Leucogonia ekeikei (Bethune-Baker, 1906)
- Mimeusemia centralis (Rothschild, 1896)
- Mimeusemia econia Hampson, 1900
- Mimeusemia simplex (T.P. Lucas, 1891)
- Periopta ardescens (Butler, 1884)
- Periopta diversa (Walker, 1865)
- Periscepta butleri (Swinhoe, 1892)
- Periscepta polysticta (Butler, 1875)
- Phalaenoides glycinae Lewin, 1805
- Phalaenoides tristifica (Hübner, 1818)
- Platagarista macleayi (W.J. Macleay, 1864)
- Radinocera maculosus (Rothschild, 1896)
- Radinocera vagata (Walker, 1865)
- Zalissa catocalina Walker, 1865
- Zalissa pratti (Bethune-Baker, 1906)
- Zalissa stichograpta Turner, 1943

== Catocalinae ==
- Abriesa derna Swinhoe, 1900
- Acantholipes juba (Swinhoe, 1902)
- Acantholipes trajecta (Walker, 1865)
- Acantholipes zuboides (Montague, 1914)
- Acanthoprora melanoleuca Hampson, 1926
- Achaea argilla Swinhoe, 1901
- Achaea eusciasta Hampson, 1913
- Achaea janata (Linnaeus, 1758)
- Achaea mercatoria (Fabricius, 1775)
- Achaea serva (Fabricius, 1775)
- Agamana callixeris (Lower, 1903)
- Agamana cavatalis Walker, 1866
- Agamana conjungens (Walker, 1858)
- Agamana pergrata (Turner, 1933)
- Agamana sarmentosa (R. Felder & Rogenhofer, 1874)
- Alapadna pauropis Turner, 1902
- Alophosoma emmelopis (Turner, 1929)
- Alophosoma hypoxantha (Lower, 1902)
- Alophosoma syngenes Turner, 1929
- Amphiongia chordophoides (T.P. Lucas, 1892)
- Anisoneura aluco (Fabricius, 1775)
- Anomis albitibia (Walker, 1858)
- Anomis combinans (Walker, 1858)
- Anomis definata T.P. Lucas, 1894
- Anomis figlina Butler, 1889
- Anomis flava (Fabricius, 1775)
- Anomis involuta (Walker, 1858)
- Anomis lyona (Swinhoe, 1919)
- Anomis nigritarsis (Walker, 1858)
- Anomis planalis (Swinhoe, 1902)
- Anomis psamathodes (Turner, 1902)
- Anomis schistosema Hampson, 1926
- Anticarsia distorta Hampson, 1926
- Anticarsia irrorata (Fabricius, 1781)
- Arcte coerula (Guenée, 1852)
- Aroana hemicyclophora (Turner, 1944)
- Aroana ochreistriga (Bethune-Baker, 1906)
- Aroana rubra Bethune-Baker, 1906
- Arsacia rectalis (Walker, 1863)
- Arthisma scissuralis Moore, 1883
- Athyrma subpunctata (Bethune-Baker, 1906)
- Attonda trifasciata (Moore, 1877)
- Audea irioleuca (Meyrick, 1897)
- Avatha discolor (Fabricius, 1794)
- Avatha novoguineana (Bethune-Baker, 1906)
- Avatha subumbra (Bethune-Baker, 1906)
- Avirostrum pratti Bethune-Baker, 1908
- Avitta discipuncta (R. Felder & Rogenhofer, 1874)
- Avitta longicorpus A.E. Prout, 1922
- Avitta ophiusalis (Walker, 1859)
- Avitta quadrilinea (Walker, 1863)
- Avitta rufifrons Moore, 1887
- Avitta zopheropa (Turner, 1909)
- Axiocteta oenoplex Turner, 1902
- Axiocteta turneri Bethune-Baker, 1906
- Bocula odontosema Turner, 1909
- Bocula sejuncta (Walker, 1856)
- Brachycyttara crypsipyrrha Turner, 1933
- Brachyona xylodesma Hampson, 1926
- Brana calopasa Walker, 1858
- Brevipecten captata (Butler, 1889)
- Calyptra minuticornis (Guenée, 1852)
- Chalciope alcyona (H. Druce, 1888)
- Chodda costiplaga (Bethune-Baker, 1906)
- Chodda ochreovenata (Bethune-Baker, 1906)
- Chrysopera combinans (Walker, 1858)
- Conosema pratti (Bethune-Baker, 1908)
- Crioa acronyctoides Walker, 1858
- Crioa aroa (Bethune-Baker, 1908)
- Crioa hades (Lower, 1903)
- Crioa indistincta (Walker, 1865)
- Crithote pannicula (Swinhoe, 1904)
- Crypsiprora ophiodesma Meyrick, 1902
- Crypsiprora orthogramma (Turner, 1936)
- Crypsiprora peratoscia (Hampson, 1926)
- Cultripalpa partita Guenée, 1852
- Cyclodes spectans Snellen, 1886
- Dahlia capnobela Turner, 1902
- Daona constellans (T.P. Lucas, 1898)
- Daona detersalis (Walker, 1866)
- Dasypodia cymatodes Guenée, 1852
- Dasypodia selenophora Guenée, 1852
- Delgamma pangonia (Guenée, 1852)
- Diatenes aglossoides Guenée, 1852
- Diatenes chalybescens Guenée, 1852
- Diatenes gerula Guenée, 1852
- Diatenes igneipicta (Lower, 1902)
- Dinumma mediobrunnea Bethune-Baker, 1906
- Diplothecta loxomita (Turner, 1908)
- Donuca castalia (Fabricius, 1775)
- Donuca lanipes (Butler, 1877)
- Donuca orbigera (Guenée, 1852)
- Donuca rubropicta (Butler, 1874)
- Donuca spectabilis Walker, 1865
- Donuca xanthopyga (Turner, 1909)
- Dordura aliena (Walker, 1865)
- Dysgonia absentimacula (Guenée, 1852)
- Dysgonia arctotaenia (Guenée, 1852)
- Dysgonia constricta (Butler, 1874)
- Dysgonia copidiphora (Hampson, 1913)
- Dysgonia curvisecta (L.B. Prout, 1919)
- Dysgonia dicoela (Turner, 1909)
- Dysgonia frontinus (Donovan, 1805)
- Dysgonia hamatilis (Guenée, 1852)
- Dysgonia hercodes (Meyrick, 1902)
- Dysgonia hicanora (Turner, 1903)
- Dysgonia infractafinis (T.P. Lucas, 1895)
- Dysgonia latizona (Butler, 1874)
- Dysgonia monogona (Lower, 1903)
- Dysgonia palumba (Guenée, 1852)
- Dysgonia propyrrha (Walker, 1858)
- Dysgonia senex (Walker, 1858)
- Dysgonia serratilinea (Bethune-Baker, 1906)
- Dysgonia simillima (Guenée, 1852)
- Dysgonia solomonensis (Hampson, 1913)
- Ecphysis robiginosa (Turner, 1943)
- Egone atrisquamata Hampson, 1926
- Egone bipunctalis Walker, 1863
- Entomogramma torsa Guenée, 1852
- Episparis angulatilinea Bethune-Baker, 1906
- Eporectis phenax Meyrick, 1902
- Eporectis tephropis (Turner, 1902)
- Ercheia dubia (Butler, 1874)
- Ercheia ekeikei Bethune-Baker, 1906
- Ercheia kebea Bethune-Baker, 1906
- Erebus crepuscularis (Linnaeus, 1758)
- Erebus macfarlanei (Butler, 1876)
- Erebus nyctaculis (Snellen, 1880)
- Erebus terminitincta (Gaede, 1938)
- Ericeia goniosema Hampson, 1922
- Ericeia inangulata (Guenée, 1852)
- Ericeia pertendens (Walker, 1858)
- Ericeia plaesiodes Turner, 1932
- Ericeia sobria Walker, 1858
- Ericeia subsignata (Walker, 1858)
- Erygia apicalis Guenée, 1852
- Eudesmeola lawsoni (R. Felder & Rogenhofer, 1874)
- Eudocima aurantia (Moore, 1877
- Eudocima cocalus (Cramer, 1777)
- Eudocima fullonia (Clerck, 1764)
- Eudocima iridescens (T.P. Lucas, 1894)
- Eudocima jordani (Holland, 1900)
- Eudocima materna (Linnaeus, 1767)
- Eudocima salaminia (Cramer, 1777)
- Eurythmus bryophiloides Butler, 1886
- Facidina polystigma (Lower, 1903)
- Facidina spilophracta (Turner, 1933)
- Felinia precedens (Walker, 1858)
- Fodina ostorius (Donovan, 1805)
- Gesonia obeditalis Walker, 1859
- Grammodes cooma Swinhoe, 1900
- Grammodes diagarmma (Lower, 1903)
- Grammodes geometrica (Fabricius, 1775)
- Grammodes justa Walker, 1858
- Grammodes occulta Berio, 1956
- Grammodes ocellata Tepper, 1890
- Grammodes oculata Snellen, 1880
- Grammodes oculicola Walker, 1858
- Grammodes pulcherrima T.P. Lucas, 1892
- Grammodes quaesita Swinhoe, 1901
- Grammodes stolida (Fabricius, 1775)
- Hamodes propitia (Guérin-Méneville, 1831)
- Heterormista modesta Swinhoe, 1901
- Heterormista psammochroa (Lower, 1903)
- Homodes bracteigutta (Walker, 1862)
- Homodes crocea Guenée, 1852
- Homodes iomolybda Meyrick, 1889
- Hopetounia albida Hampson, 1926
- Hopetounia carda Swinhoe, 1902
- Hopetounia pudica (Lower, 1903)
- Hulodes caranea (Cramer, 1780)
- Hulodes drylla Guenée, 1852
- Hyperlopha amicta Turner, 1903
- Hyperlopha aridela Turner, 1902
- Hyperlopha cristifera (Walker, 1865)
- Hypocala affinis Rothschild, 1915
- Hypocala deflorata (Fabricius, 1792)
- Hypocala guttiventris Walker, 1858
- Hypocala toana Swinhoe, 1915
- Hypocala violacea Butler, 1879
- Hypoprora tyra (Swinhoe, 1902)
- Hyposemansis asbolaea (Lower, 1903)
- Hypospila creberrima (Walker, 1858)
- Hypospila dochmotoma (Turner, 1939)
- Ischyja albata (R. Felder & Rogenhofer, 1874)
- Ischyja ebusa Swinhoe, 1902
- Ischyja manlia (Cramer, 1766)
- Ischyja neocherina (Butler, 1877)
- Lacera noctilio (Fabricius, 1794)
- Lacera uniformis Holloway, 1979
- Leptotroga costalis (Moore, 1883)
- Lophoruza albisecta (Warren, 1913)
- Lophoruza diversalis (Walker, 1866)
- Lophozancla prolixa Turner, 1932
- Loxioda hampsoni (Bethune-Baker, 1906)
- Lyncestis melanoschista (Meyrick, 1897)
- Lyncestis phaeocrossa Turner, 1932
- Mecodina bisignata (Walker, 1865)
- Mecodina praecipua (Walker, 1865)
- Meranda gilviceps (Turner, 1908)
- Meranda holochrysa Meyrick, 1902
- Meranda susialis (Walker, 1859)
- Mocis alterna (Walker, 1858)
- Mocis frugalis (Fabricius, 1775)
- Mocis trifasciata (Stephens, 1830)
- Nagia compsotrephes (Turner, 1932)
- Nagia linteola (Guenée, 1852)
- Nagia sthenistica Hampson, 1926
- Neogabara plagiola Wileman & West, 1929
- Niguza anisogramma Lower, 1905
- Niguza eucesta (Turner, 1903)
- Niguza habroscopa Lower, 1915
- Niguza oculita Swinhoe, 1901
- Niguza spiramioides Walker, 1858
- Olyssa calamitosa Walker, 1858
- Ophisma gravata Guenée, 1852
- Ophiusa coronata (Fabricius, 1775)
- Ophiusa costiplaga (Hulstaert, 1924)
- Ophiusa discriminans (Walker, 1858)
- Ophiusa disjungens (Walker, 1858)
- Ophiusa hituense (Pagenstecher, 1884)
- Ophiusa novenaria (T.P. Lucas, 1898)
- Ophiusa parcemacula (T.P. Lucas, 1891)
- Ophiusa tirhaca (Cramer, 1777)
- Ophiusa trapezium (Guenée, 1852)
- Ophyx eurrhoa (Lower, 1903)
- Ophyx ochroptera Guenée, 1852
- Ophyx pseudoptera (Lower, 1903)
- Oraesia argyrosigna Moore, 1884
- Oraesia emarginata (Fabricius, 1794)
- Orthozancla rhythmotypa Turner, 1933
- Oxygonitis sericeata Hampson, 1893
- Oxyodes scrobiculata (Fabricius, 1775)
- Oxyodes tricolor Guenée, 1852
- Pandesma partita (Walker, 1858)
- Pandesma quenavadi Guenée, 1852
- Pandesma submurina (Walker, 1865)
- Pangrapta adoxopis (Turner, 1908)
- Pangrapta aroa Bethune-Baker, 1906
- Pantydia canescens Walker, 1869
- Pantydia capistrata T.P. Lucas, 1894
- Pantydia diemeni Guenée, 1852
- Pantydia metaphaea (Hampson, 1912)
- Pantydia metaspila (Walker, 1858)
- Pantydia sparsa Guenée, 1852
- Parapadna placospila (Turner, 1908)
- Parapadna zonophora (Turner, 1908)
- Pericyma cruegeri (Butler, 1886)
- Phyllodes imperialis H. Druce, 1888
- Phytometra formosalis (Walker, 1866)
- Phytometra laevis (Swinhoe, 1901)
- Platyja cyanopasta (Turner, 1908)
- Platyja exequialis (T.P. Lucas, 1901)
- Platyja umminia (Cramer, 1780)
- Plecoptera quaesita (Swinhoe, 1885)
- Plusiodonta arctipennis Butler, 1886
- Plusiodonta coelonota (Kollar, 1844)
- Polydesma boarmoides Guenée, 1852
- Polydesmiola meekii (T.P. Lucas, 1894)
- Praxis aterrima (Walker, 1856)
- Praxis difficilis (Walker, 1858)
- Praxis dirigens Walker, 1858
- Praxis edwardsii Guenée, 1852
- Praxis limbatis (Strand, 1924)
- Praxis marmarinopa Meyrick, 1897
- Praxis pandesma (Lower, 1902)
- Praxis porphyretica Guenée, 1852
- Prorocopis eulopha (Lower, 1903)
- Prorocopis euxantha Lower, 1902
- Prorocopis leucocrossa Lower, 1903
- Prorocopis melanochorda Meyrick, 1897
- Prorocopis transversilinea (Turner, 1941)
- Pseudogyrtona fulvana Bethune-Baker, 1908
- Pseudogyrtona perversa (Walker, 1862)
- Pterocyclophora huntei Warren, 1903
- Radara subcupralis (Walker, 1866)
- Ramadasa crystallina (Lower, 1899)
- Raparna crocophara Turner, 1922
- Rhapsa eretmophora Turner, 1932
- Rhapsa occidentalis Turner, 1944
- Rhapsa suscitatalis (Walker, 1859)
- Rhesala imparata Walker, 1858
- Rhesalides curvata (T.P. Lucas, 1895)
- Saroba maculicosta (Walker, 1858)
- Saroba niphomacula (Lower, 1903)
- Saroba rufescens (Pagenstecher, 1884)
- Saroba trimaculata (Warren, 1903)
- Savara variabilis (Pagenstecher, 1888)
- Schistorhynx unistriga Roepke, 1938
- Serrodes campana Guenée, 1852
- Serrodes mediopallens A.E. Prout, 1924
- Speiredonia darwiniana Zilli, 2010
- Speiredonia mutabilis (Fabricius, 1794)
- Speiredonia spectans (Guenée, 1852)
- Speiredonia zamis (Stoll, 1790)
- Spirama recessa (Walker, 1858)
- Stenocarsia metaplatys Hampson, 1926
- Stenoprora adelopis (Lower, 1903)
- Stenoprora apicinota (Turner, 1944)
- Stenoprora lophota (Lower, 1903)
- Stenoprora perspicua (Turner, 1941)
- Stenoprora triplax Turner, 1944
- Sympis parkeri T.P. Lucas, 1894
- Sympis rufibasis Guenée, 1852
- Sypna buruensis A.E. Prout, 1926
- Tamba conscripta (T.P. Lucas, 1892)
- Tamba cyrtogramma (Turner, 1908)
- Tamba elachista Hampson, 1926
- Tamba haemacta (Turner, 1908)
- Tamba meeki (Bethune-Baker, 1906)
- Tamba syndesma (Lower, 1903)
- Tamba tephraea (Turner, 1909)
- Tathorhynchus fallax Swinhoe, 1902
- Throana blechrodes (Turner, 1903)
- Thyas miniacea (R. Felder & Rogenhofer, 1874)
- Tolpiodes aphanta (Turner, 1902)
- Tolpiodes melanoproctis Hampson, 1926
- Tolpiodes oligolasia Hampson, 1926
- Trigonodes cephise (Cramer, 1779)
- Trigonodes hyppasia (Cramer, 1779)
- Tropidtamba lepraota (Hampson, 1898)
- Ulotrichopus dinawa (Bethune-Baker, 1906)
- Veia caeruleotincta (Rothschild, 1915)
- Veia contracta (Walker, 1865)
- Veia microsticta (Turner, 1908)
- Xanthanomis fuscifrons (Walker, 1864)
- Xenogenes chrysoplaca Meyrick, 1910
- Xenogenes gloriosa (T.P. Lucas, 1891)

The following species belongs to the subfamily Catocalinae, but have not been assigned to a genus yet. Given here is the original name given to the species when it was first described:

- Prorocopis acroleuca Turner, 1929
- Eustrotia acroleuca Turner, 1945
- Crioa acronyctina Butler, 1886
- Catada acrospila Turner, 1906
- Sophta aeluropis Meyrick, 1902
- Zethes alfura R. Felder & Rogenhofer, 1874
- Glottula atronitens Walker, 1856
- Madope auferens T.P. Lucas, 1898
- Zethes ekeikei Bethune-Baker, 1906
- Stenoprora eurycycla Turner, 1936
- Crioa lophosoma Turner, 1906
- Raparna lugubris Turner, 1922
- Oruza maerens Turner, 1936
- Noctua microrrhoea Fabricius, 1775
- Crioa niphobleta Turner, 1929
- Crioa nycterina Turner, 1902
- Crysiprora oxymetopa Turner, 1941
- Plecoptera plinthochroa Hampson, 1926
- Oglasa prionosticha Turner, 1944
- Amyna spilonota Lower, 1903
- Prorocopis stenota Lower, 1903
- Hypoprora tortuosa Turner, 1929
- Raparna trigramma Turner, 1906

== Chloephorinae ==
- Acachmena xylonota (Lower, 1903)
- Aiteta iridias (Meyrick, 1889)
- Ariola coelisigna Walker, 1858
- Armactica columbina Walker, 1865
- Armactica conchidia (Butler, 1886)
- Armactica endoleuca Hampson, 1912
- Austrocarea iocephala (Turner, 1902)
- Beara falcata Holloway, 1982
- Cacyparis brevipennis Warren, 1916
- Cacyparis melanolitha Turner, 1909
- Carea unipunctata Bethune-Baker, 1906
- Careades huntei (Warren, 1903)
- Careades plana Warren, 1916
- Clytophylla artia Turner, 1929
- Earias chlorodes Meyrick, 1902
- Earias flavida C. Felder, 1861
- Earias huegeliana Gaede, 1937
- Earias luteolaria Hampson, 1891
- Earias paralella T.P. Lucas, 1898
- Earias smaragdina Butler, 1886
- Earias subviridis T.P. Lucas, 1898
- Earias vittella (Fabricius, 1794)
- Eligma orthoxantha Lower, 1903
- Gabala australiata Warren, 1916
- Lasiolopha saturata (Walker, 1865)
- Maceda mansueta Walker, 1858
- Maceda rotundimacula Warren, 1912
- Maurilia iconica (Walker, 1857)
- Negeta signata (Walker, 1863)
- Orthocraspis leptoplasta Turner, 1920
- Paracrama latimargo Warren, 1916
- Pterogonia cardinalis Holloway, 1976
- Vizaga mirabilis (Bethune-Baker, 1906)
- Westermannia argentata Butler, 1886
- Westermannia concha Butler, 1886
- Westermannia gloriosa (Hampson, 1912)
- Xanthodes albago (Fabricius, 1794)
- Xanthodes amata Walker, 1865
- Xanthodes congenita (Hampson, 1912)
- Xanthodes emboloscia (Turner, 1902)
- Xanthodes transversa Guenée, 1852

The following species belongs to the subfamily Chloephorinae, but have not been assigned to a genus yet. Given here is the original name given to the species when it was first described:

- Blenina samphirophora Turner, 1920

== Cuculliinae ==
- Neogalea sunia (Guenée, 1852)

== Euteliinae ==
- Anigraea cinctipalpis (Walker, 1865)
- Anigraea ochrobasis Hampson, 1912
- Anigraea particolor Warren, 1914
- Aplotelia tripartita (Semper, 1900)
- Atacira olivaceiplaga (Bethune-Baker, 1906)
- Chlumetia euthysticha (Turner, 1941)
- Chlumetia transversa (Walker, 1863)
- Paectes costistrigata (Bethune-Baker, 1906)
- Paectes cyanodes (Turner, 1902)
- Pataeta carbo (Guenée, 1852)
- Penicillaria dorsipuncta (Hampson, 1912)
- Penicillaria jocosatrix Guenée, 1952
- Targalla delatrix (Guenée, 1852)
- Targalla palliatrix (Guenée, 1852)
- Targalla plumbea (Walker, 1865)
- Targalla scelerata (Holland, 1900)
- Targalla subocellata (Walker, 1863)
- Targalla suffundens (Walker, 1863)

The following species belongs to the subfamily Euteliinae, but have not been assigned to a genus yet. Given here is the original name given to the species when it was first described:

- Eutelia diapera Hampson, 1902

== Hadeninae ==
- Brithys crini (Fabricius, 1775)
- Cirphis ebriosa (Guenée, 1852)
- Dasygaster atrata Turner, 1931
- Dasygaster padockina Guillou, 1841)
- Elusa ceneusalis Walker, 1859
- Elusa oenolopha Turner, 1902
- Elusa pyrrhobaphes (Turner, 1943)
- Elusa semipecten Swinhoe, 1901
- Eurypsyche lewinii (Butler, 1886)
- Leucania loreyi (Duponchel, 1827)
- Leucania stenographa Lower, 1900
- Leucania cruegeri Butler, 1886
- Leucania linearis T.P. lucas, 1892
- Leucania obumbrata T.P. Lucas, 1894
- Leucania polysticha Turner, 1902
- Leucania venalba Moore, 1867
- Leucania yu Guenée, 1852
- Leucania abdominalis (Walker, 1856)
- Leucania dasycnema (Turner, 1912)
- Leucania designata Walker, 1856
- Leucania diatrecta Butler, 1886
- Leucania leucosta Lower, 1902
- Leucania porphyrodes (Turner, 1911)
- Leucania rhodopsara (Turner, 1911)
- Leucania uda Guenée, 1852
- Leucania vibicosa (Turner, 1920)
- Metopiora sanguinata (T.P. Lucas, 1892)
- Mythimna acontosema (Turner, 1903)
- Mythimna reversa (Moore, 1884)
- Mythimna convecta (Walker, 1857)
- Mythimna separata (Walker, 1865)
- Mythimna consanguis (Guenée, 1852)
- Mythimna cryptargyrea (Bethune-Baker, 1905)
- Mythimna decisissima (Walker, 1865)
- Mythimna formosana (Butler, 1880)
- Mythimna leucosphenia (Bethune-Baker, 1905)
- Mythimna nigrilinea (Leech, 1889)
- Mythimna semicana (Pagenstecher, 1900)
- Persectania dyscrita Common, 1954
- Persectania ewingii (Westwood, 1839)
- Tiracola plagiata (Walker, 1857)

== Heliothinae ==
- Adisura litarga (Turner, 1920)
- Adisura marginalis (Walker, 1858)
- Australothis exopisso Matthews, 1999
- Australothis rubrescens (Walker, 1858)
- Australothis tertia (Roepke, 1941)
- Helicoverpa armigera (Hübner, 1808)
- Helicoverpa assulta (Guenée, 1852)
- Helicoverpa hardwicki Matthews, 1999
- Helicoverpa prepodes (Common, 1985)
- Helicoverpa punctigera (Wallengren, 1860)
- Heliocheilus abaccheutus Matthews, 1999
- Heliocheilus aberrans (Butler, 1886)
- Heliocheilus albivenata (Montague, 1914)
- Heliocheilus aleurota (Lower, 1902)
- Heliocheilus atrilinea (Turner, 1943)
- Heliocheilus canusina (Swinhoe, 1901)
- Heliocheilus cistella (Swinhoe, 1901)
- Heliocheilus cladotus Swinhoe, 1901
- Heliocheilus cramboides (Guenée, 1852)
- Heliocheilus eodora (Meyrick, 1902)
- Heliocheilus ferruginosa (Turner, 1911)
- Heliocheilus flavitincta (Lower, 1908)
- Heliocheilus fumata (T.P. Lucas, 1890)
- Heliocheilus halimolimnus Matthews, 1999
- Heliocheilus ionola (Swinhoe, 1901)
- Heliocheilus melibaphes (Hampson, 1903)
- Heliocheilus mesoleuca (Lower, 1902)
- Heliocheilus moribunda (Guenée, 1852)
- Heliocheilus neurota (Lower, 1903)
- Heliocheilus pallida (Butler, 1886)
- Heliocheilus puncticulata (Warren, 1913)
- Heliocheilus ranalaetensis Matthews, 1999
- Heliocheilus rhodopolia (Turner, 1911)
- Heliocheilus thelycritus Matthews, 1999
- Heliocheilus vulpinotatus Matthews, 1999
- Heliothis hoarei Matthews, 1999
- Heliothis punctifera Walker, 1857
- Heliothis roseivena (Walker, 1866)

== Hypeninae ==
- Aethalina asaphes Turner, 1902
- Arrade cristatum (Hampson, 1893)
- Arrade destituta (Walker, 1865)
- Arrade erebusalis Walker, 1863
- Arrade leucocosmalis (Walker, 1863)
- Arrade percnopis Turner, 1908
- Artigisa byrsopa (Lower, 1903)
- Artigisa dentilinea (Turner, 1909)
- Artigisa impropria (Walker, 1865)
- Artigisa lignicolaria (Walker, 1866)
- Artigisa melanephele Hampson, 1914
- Britha biguttata Walker, 1866
- Calathusa aethalistis Lower, 1915
- Calathusa allopis (Meyrick, 1902)
- Calathusa anisocentra Turner, 1944
- Calathusa basicunea Walker, 1858
- Calathusa charactis (Meyrick, 1902)
- Calathusa cyrtosticha Turner, 1929
- Calathusa dispila (Turner, 1902)
- Calathusa eremna (Turner, 1902)
- Calathusa glaucopasta Turner, 1941
- Calathusa hemicapna Turner, 1939
- Calathusa hemiscia Lower, 1915
- Calathusa hypotherma (Lower, 1903)
- Calathusa ischnodes (Turner, 1903)
- Calathusa maritima Turner, 1941
- Calathusa mesospila (Turner, 1902)
- Calathusa metableta (Turner, 1902)
- Calathusa octogesima (Turner, 1902)
- Calathusa phaeoneura Turner, 1939
- Calathusa polyplecta Turner, 1929
- Calathusa stenophylla (Turner, 1902)
- Calathusa taphreuta (Meyrick, 1902)
- Calathusa thermosticha Lower, 1915
- Catada charalis Swinhoe, 1900
- Catadoides punctata Bethune-Baker, 1908
- Dichromia quinqualis Walker, 1859
- Elaphristis anthracia Meyrick, 1891
- Elaphristis anthracitis (Turner, 1902)
- Elaphristis leucochorda (Turner, 1902)
- Elaphristis melanica (Turner, 1902)
- Elaphristis psoloessa (Turner, 1909)
- Epitripta acosmopis Turner, 1902
- Esthlodora cyanospila Turner, 1908
- Esthlodora variabilis (Swinhoe, 1901)
- Esthlodora versicolor Turner, 1902
- Euphiuche apoblepta (Turner, 1908)
- Foveades aroensis Bethune-Baker, 1908
- Goniocraspedon mistura (Swinhoe, 1891)
- Goniophylla fragilis Turner, 1945
- Harita brachyphylla (Turner, 1903)
- Harita nebulosa (Moore, 1881)
- Harita nodyna (Bethune-Baker, 1908)
- Hypena conscitalis Walker, 1866
- Hypena euryzostra Turner, 1932
- Hypena gonospilalis Walker, 1866
- Hypena gypsospila Turner, 1903
- Hypena hoareae Holloway, 1977
- Hypena incognata Bethune-Baker, 1908
- Hypena isogona Meyrick, 1889
- Hypena labatalis Walker, 1859
- Hypena laceratalis Walker, 1859
- Hypena mandatalis Walker, 1859
- Hypena masurialis Guenée, 1854
- Hypena orthographa Turner, 1932
- Hypena pelodes Turner, 1932
- Hypena simplex T.P. Lucas, 1895
- Hypena subvittalis Walker, 1866
- Hypena sylpha Butler, 1887
- Hypenagonia mesoscia (Turner, 1933)
- Hypenarana acrocausta (Turner, 1944)
- Hypertrocta brunnea (Bethune-Baker, 1908)
- Lophotoma diagrapha Turner, 1902
- Lophotoma metabula Turner, 1902
- Lysimelia lenis (T.P. Lucas, 1898)
- Mecistoptera albisigna Hampson, 1912
- Mecistoptera lithochroa Lower, 1903
- Metaphoenia rhodias (Turner, 1908)
- Meyrickella ruptellus (Walker, 1863)
- Meyrickella torquesauria (T.P. Lucas, 1892)
- Naarda calliceros Turner, 1932
- Naarda xanthonephra Turner, 1908
- Olulis subrosea Turner, 1908
- Panilla aroa Bethune-Baker, 1906
- Panilla spilotis (Meyrick, 1902)
- Paonidia anthracias (Lower, 1897)
- Parilyrgis concolor Bethune-Baker, 1908
- Parilyrgis nyctichroa (Turner, 1908)
- Paurophylla aleuropasta Turner, 1902
- Pherechoa crypsichlora Turner, 1932
- Philogethes metableta Turner, 1939
- Prionopterina grammatistis (Meyrick, 1897)
- Prionopterina modesta Turner, 1936
- Prionopterina tritosticha (Turner, 1902)
- Prolophota pallida (Turner, 1936)
- Rhodina falculalis Guenée, 1854
- Rhodina hyporrhoda (Turner, 1902)
- Rhynchina inornata (Butler, 1886)
- Rhynchodontodes chalcias (T.P. Lucas, 1895)
- Sandava scitisignata (Walker, 1862)
- Sandava xylistis Swinhoe, 1900
- Sarobela litterata (Pagenstecher, 1888)
- Stenopaltis lithina Swinhoe, 1901
- Synolulis rhodinastis (Meyrick, 1902)
- Tigrana detritalis Walker, 1866
- Tigrana fervidalis Walker, 1866

== Hypenodinae ==
- Luceria oculalis (Moore, 1877)
- Schrankia capnophanes (Turner, 1939)
- Schrankia costaestrigalis (Stephens, 1834)
- Trigonistis demonias Meyrick, 1902

== Noctuinae ==
- Agrotis emboloma (Lower, 1918)
- Agrotis infusa (Boisduval, 1832)
- Agrotis interjectionis Guenée, 1852
- Agrotis ipsilon (Hufnagel, 1766)
- Agrotis munda Walker, 1857
- Agrotis poliophaea Turner, 1926
- Agrotis poliotis (Hampson, 1903)
- Agrotis porphyricollis Guenée, 1852
- Agrotis radians Guenée, 1852
- Buciara bipartita Walker, 1869
- Diarsia intermixta (Guenée, 1852)
- Ectopatria aspera (Walker, 1857)
- Ectopatria clavigera (Turner, 1943)
- Ectopatria contrasta Strand, 1924
- Ectopatria deloptis (Lower, 1908)
- Ectopatria euglypta (Lower, 1908)
- Ectopatria horologa (Meyrick, 1897)
- Ectopatria loxonephra (Turner, 1944)
- Ectopatria mniodes (Lower, 1902)
- Ectopatria mundoides (Lower, 1893)
- Ectopatria neuroides (Swinhoe, 1901)
- Ectopatria ochroleuca (Lower, 1902)
- Ectopatria paurogramma (Lower, 1902)
- Ectopatria pelosticta (Lower, 1902)
- Ectopatria plinthina (Hampson, 1909)
- Ectopatria spilonata (Lower, 1902)
- Ectopatria subrufescens (Walker, 1865)
- Ectopatria umbrosa Hampson, 1903
- Ectopatria virginea Lower, 1905
- Ectopatria xerampelina (Turner, 1904)

== Nolinae ==
- Acatapaustus atrinota (Hampson, 1911)
- Acatapaustus leucospila (Turner, 1899)
- Acatapaustus mesoleuca (Lower, 1903)
- Acatapaustus metallopa (Meyrick, 1886)
- Aquita plagiochyta (Turner, 1944)
- Aquita tactalis (Walker, 1863)
- Barasa cymatistis (Meyrick, 1889)
- Elesma subglauca Walker, 1865
- Meganola major (Hampson, 1891)
- Nola achromia Hampson, 1909
- Nola aenictis (Meyrick, 1888)
- Nola albalis (Walker, 1866)
- Nola amorpha (Turner, 1944)
- Nola anisogona (Lower, 1893)
- Nola argentea (T.P. Lucas, 1890)
- Nola atmophanes (Turner, 1944)
- Nola aulacota (Meyrick, 1886)
- Nola bathycyrta (Turner, 1944)
- Nola belotypa Hampson, 1914
- Nola bifascialis (Walker, 1865)
- Nola biguttalis Walker, 1866
- Nola celaenephes (Turner, 1944)
- Nola ceramota (Turner, 1944)
- Nola cerraunias (Turner, 1899)
- Nola coelobathra (Turner, 1944)
- Nola coelophora (Turner, 1944)
- Nola crucigera (Turner, 1944)
- Nola cycota (Meyrick, 1886)
- Nola cymatias (Turner, 1944)
- Nola delograpta (Turner, 1944)
- Nola desmotes (Turner, 1899)
- Nola diastropha (Turner, 1944)
- Nola elaphra (Turner, 1944)
- Nola elaphropasta (Turner, 1944)
- Nola epicentra (Meyrick, 1886)
- Nola eucolpa (Turner, 1944)
- Nola eucompsa (Turner, 1944)
- Nola euraphes (Turner, 1944)
- Nola eurrhyncha (Turner, 1944)
- Nola eurylopha Turner, 1944
- Nola fasciata (Walker, 1866)
- Nola fovifera (Hampson, 1903)
- Nola goniophora Turner, 1944
- Nola hesycha (Meyrick, 1888)
- Nola irenica (Meyrick, 1886)
- Nola lechriopa Hampson, 1914
- Nola lechriotropa (Turner, 1944)
- Nola leucolopha (Turner, 1944)
- Nola leucoma (Meyrick, 1886)
- Nola maculifera (Turner, 1944)
- Nola melanogramma Hampson, 1900
- Nola microphila (Turner, 1899)
- Nola monozona (Lower, 1897)
- Nola niphostena (Lower, 1896)
- Nola ochrosticha Turner, 1944
- Nola parallacta (Meyrick, 1886)
- Nola paromoea (Meyrick, 1886)
- Nola paroxynta (Meyrick, 1886)
- Nola phaeogramma (Turner, 1944)
- Nola phloeophila Hampson, 1914
- Nola plagioschema Turner, 1939
- Nola platygona (Lower, 1897)
- Nola pleurochorda (Turner, 1944)
- Nola pleurosema (Turner, 1944)
- Nola poliophasma (Turner, 1933)
- Nola porrigens (Walker, 1858)
- Nola pothina Turner, 1944
- Nola pycnographa (Turner, 1944)
- Nola pycnopasta (Turner, 1944)
- Nola pygmaeodes (Turner, 1944)
- Nola scabralis (Walker, 1866)
- Nola semograpta (Meyrick, 1886)
- Nola sphaerospila (Turner, 1944)
- Nola subpallida (Turner, 1944)
- Nola taeniata Snellen, 1875
- Nola tetralopha (Turner, 1944)
- Nola tholera (Turner, 1926)
- Nola tornotis (Meyrick, 1888)
- Nola vepallida Turner, 1944
- Nola vernalis Lower, 1900
- Nola zaplethes Hampson, 1914
- Pisara hyalospila Hampson, 1914
- Uraba deplanana Walker, 1866
- Uraba lugens Walker, 1863

== Plusiinae ==
- Anadevidia peponis (Fabricius, 1775)
- Argyrogramma signata (Fabricius, 1775)
- Chrysodeixis acuta (Walker, 1858)
- Chrysodeixis argentifera (Guenée, 1852)
- Chrysodeixis eriosoma (Doubleday, 1843)
- Chrysodeixis illuminata (G.S. Robinson, 1968)
- Chrysodeixis subsidens (Walker, 1858)
- Ctenoplusia albostriata (Bremer & Grey, 1853)
- Ctenoplusia chillagoes (T.P. Lucas, 1900)
- Ctenoplusia furcifera (Walker, 1858)
- Dactyloplusia impulsa (Walker, 1865)
- Notioplusia illustrata (Guenée, 1852)
- Scriptoplusia rubiflabellata (A.E. Prout, 1921)
- Thysanoplusia orichalcea (Fabricius, 1775)
- Trichoplusia lectula (Walker, 1858)
- Zonoplusia ochreata (Walker, 1865)

== Rivulinae ==
- Rivula aenictopis Turner, 1908
- Rivula biagi Bethune-Baker, 1908
- Rivula concinna (T.P. Lucas, 1895)
- Rivula curvifera (Walker, 1862)
- Rivula everta Swinhoe, 1901
- Rivula niphodesma Meyrick, 1891
- Rivula obtusalis Walker, 1866 (status unknown, probably invalid)

== Sarrothripinae ==
- Blenina donans Walker, 1858
- Blenina lichenopa (Meyrick, 1897)
- Blenina viridata Bethune-Baker, 1906
- Characoma curiosa (Swinhoe, 1890)
- Characoma nilotica (Rogenhofer, 1882)
- Characoma vallata (Meyrick, 1902)
- Dilophothripa lobata Hampson, 1907
- Etanna basalis Walker, 1862
- Garella rotundipennis Walker, 1863
- Giaura punctata (T.P. Lucas, 1890)
- Gyrtothripa pusilla (Moore, 1888)
- Hypolispa leucopolia Turner, 1926
- Iscadia inexacta (Walker, 1858)
- Iscadia poliochroa (Hampson, 1912)
- Iscadia pulchra (Butler, 1886)
- Labanda huntei Warren, 1903
- Lophothripa vitea (Swinhoe, 1885)
- Microthripa baeota (Turner, 1902)
- Mniothripa bradleyi D.S. Fletcher, 1957
- Nanaguna albisecta Hampson, 1905
- Nanaguna breviuscula Walker, 1863
- Nanaguna clopaea (Turner, 1902)
- Nanaguna polypoecila Turner, 1929
- Nanaguna praedulcis Turner, 1920
- Nanaguna quadrifera Warren, 1914
- Nanaguna variegata (Hampson, 1894)
- Nycteola exophila (Meyrick, 1888)
- Nycteola indica (R. Felder, 1874)
- Nycteola minutum (Turner, 1902)
- Nycteola polycyma (Turner, 1899)
- Nycteola symmicta (Turner, 1902)
- Ochrothripa leptochroma (Turner, 1902)
- Ochthophora sericina Turner, 1902
- Ochthophora turneri Bethune-Baker, 1906
- Risoba grisea Bethune-Baker, 1906
- Selepa celtis Moore, 1858
- Selepa circulella (Walker, 1866)
- Selepa discigera (Walker, 1864)
- Selepa euryochra Turner, 1920
- Selepa geraea (Hampson, 1905)
- Selepa rhythmopis (Turner, 1902)
- Thriponea melanograpta (Turner, 1920)
- Thriponea nigrostrigata (Bethune-Baker, 1905)
- Thriponea orbiculigera (Turner, 1936)
- Timorodes blepharias Meyrick, 1902

== Stictopterinae ==
- Aegilia describens Walker, 1858
- Aegilia indescribens (A.E. Prout, 1922)
- Gyrtona polionota Hampson, 1905
- Gyrtona semicarbonalis Walker, 1863
- Lophoptera abbreviata Walker, 1865
- Lophoptera hemithyris (Hampson, 1905)
- Lophoptera melanesigera Holloway, 1985
- Lophoptera nama (Swinhoe, 1900)
- Lophoptera vittigera Walker, 1865
- Savoca divitalis (Walker, 1863)
- Savoca lophota (Turner, 1909)
- Savoca xista (Swinhoe, 1893)
- Stictoptera aequisecta Turner, 1933
- Stictoptera cucullioides Guenée, 1852
- Stictoptera macromma Snellen, 1880
- Stictoptera pammeces Turner, 1920

== Stirriinae ==
- Austrazenia pura (Swinhoe, 1902)
- Austrazenia tusa (Swinhoe, 1902)

== Aganainae ==
- Agape chloropyga (Walker, 1854)
- Asota australis (Boisduval, 1832)
- Asota caricae (Fabricius, 1775)
- Asota heliconia (Linnaeus, 1758)
- Asota iodamia (Herrich-Schäffer, 1854)
- Asota orbona (Vollenhoven, 1863)
- Asota plagiata (Walker, 1854)
- Digama marmorea Butler, 1877
- Neochera dominia (Cramer, 1780)
