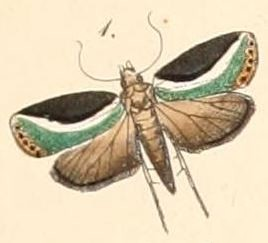

Scientific classification
- Kingdom: Animalia
- Phylum: Arthropoda
- Class: Insecta
- Order: Lepidoptera
- Superfamily: Noctuoidea
- Family: Nolidae
- Genus: Ariola
- Species: A. ransonneti

Binomial name
- Ariola ransonneti Felder & Rogenhofer, 1874

= Ariola ransonneti =

Species of moth

Ariola ransonneti is a moth of the family Nolidae first described by Felder and Rogenhofer in 1874. It is only known from Sri Lanka.

== Taxonomy ==
Ariola ransonneti was placed as a synonym of Ariola coelisigna in Poole (1989), it is now treated as a valid species.
