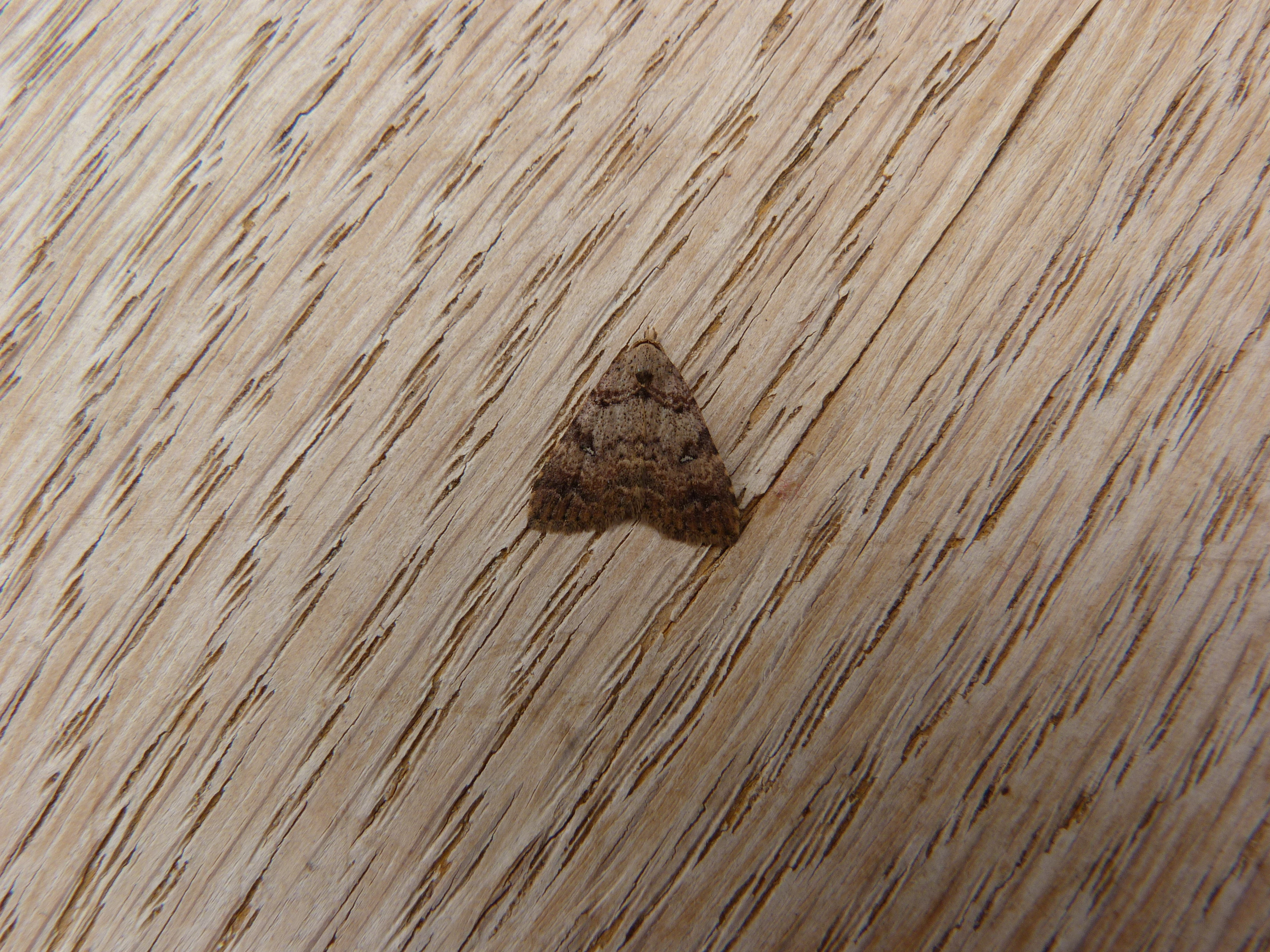
- Alapadna pauropis

Scientific classification
- Domain: Eukaryota
- Kingdom: Animalia
- Phylum: Arthropoda
- Class: Insecta
- Order: Lepidoptera
- Superfamily: Noctuoidea
- Family: Noctuidae (?)
- Subfamily: Catocalinae
- Genus: Alapadna; Turner, 1902

= Alapadna =

Genus of moths

Alapadna is a genus of moths of the family Noctuidae. The genus was erected by Alfred Jefferis Turner in 1902.

== Species ==
- Alapadna micropis Hampson, 1926
- Alapadna pauropis Turner, 1902
