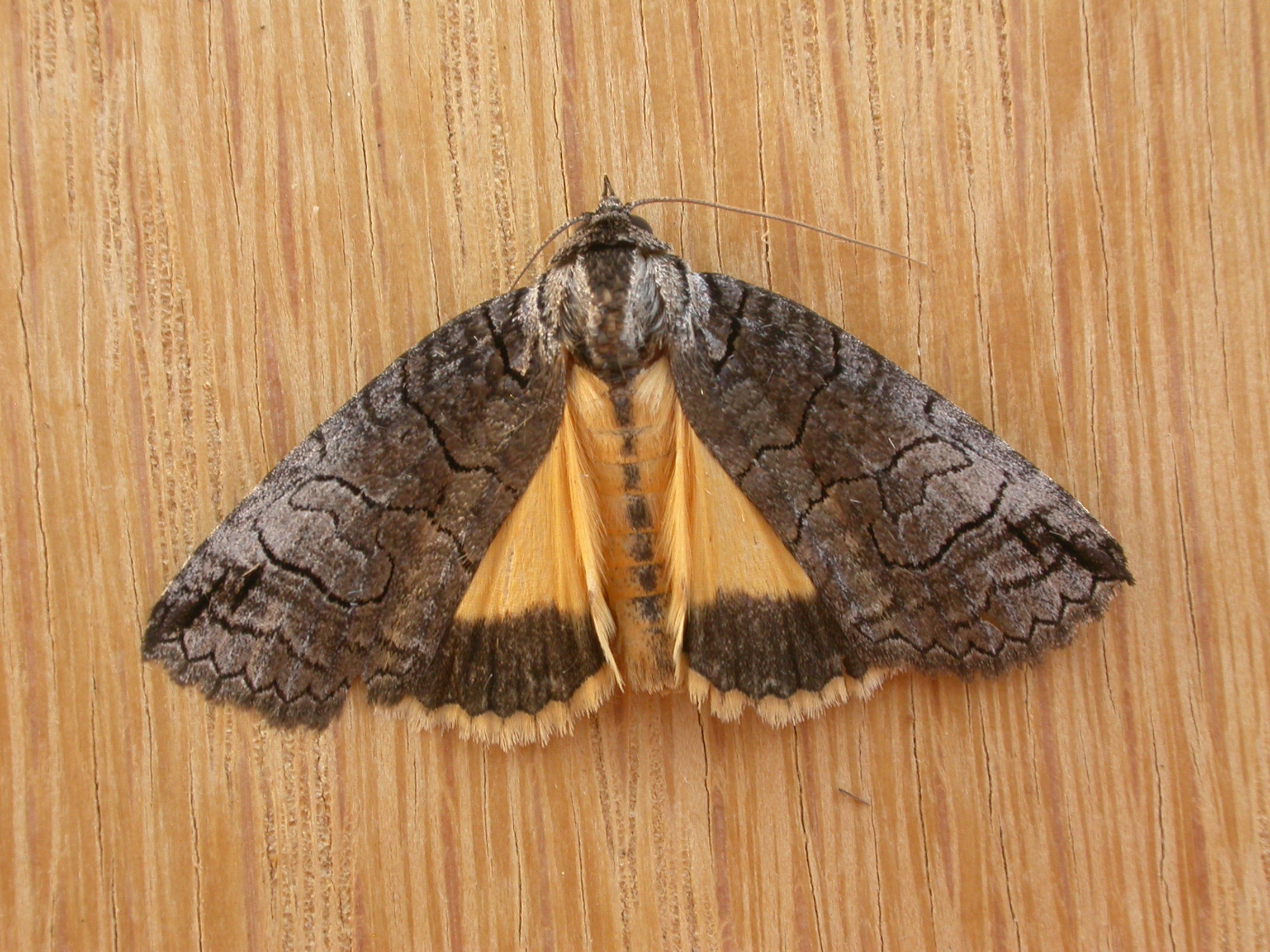
- Prorocopis euxantha

Scientific classification
- Kingdom: Animalia
- Phylum: Arthropoda
- Class: Insecta
- Order: Lepidoptera
- Superfamily: Noctuoidea
- Family: Noctuidae
- Genus: Prorocopis; Meyrick, 1897

= Prorocopis =

Genus of moths

Prorocopis is a genus of moths of the family Erebidae. The genus was erected by Edward Meyrick in 1897. All the species in the genus are known from Australia.

== Species ==
- Prorocopis acroleuca Turner, 1929 Queensland
- Prorocopis eulopha (Lower, 1903) New South Wales
- Prorocopis euxantha Lower, 1902 Queensland
- Prorocopis leucocrossa Lower, 1903 New South Wales
- Prorocopis melanochorda Meyrick, 1897 Western Australia
- Prorocopis stenota Lower, 1903 Queensland, New South Wales
- Prorocopis transversilinea (Turner, 1941) Queensland
