= Alypophanes =

Scientific classification
- Domain: Eukaryota
- Kingdom: Animalia
- Phylum: Arthropoda
- Class: Insecta
- Order: Lepidoptera
- Superfamily: Noctuoidea
- Family: Noctuidae
- Subfamily: Acontiinae
- Genus: Alypophanes; Turner, 1908

Genus of moths

Alypophanes is a genus of moths of the family Noctuidae.

== Species ==
- Alypophanes flavirosea Hampson, 1911
- Alypophanes iridocosma Turner, 1908
- Alypophanes phoenicoxantha Hampson, 1911
