= Austrazenia =

Scientific classification
- Domain: Eukaryota
- Kingdom: Animalia
- Phylum: Arthropoda
- Class: Insecta
- Order: Lepidoptera
- Superfamily: Noctuoidea
- Family: Noctuidae
- Subfamily: Acontiinae
- Tribe: Chamaecleini
- Genus: Austrazenia; Warren, 1913

Genus of moths

Austrazenia is a genus of moths of the family Noctuidae.

== Species ==
- Austrazenia pura (Swinhoe, 1902)
- Austrazenia tusa (Swinhoe, 1902)
