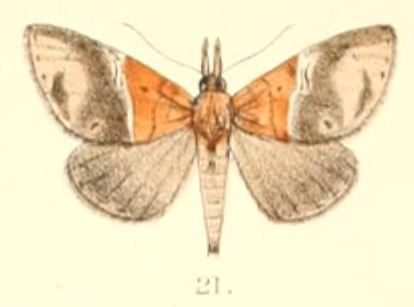

Scientific classification
- Domain: Eukaryota
- Kingdom: Animalia
- Phylum: Arthropoda
- Class: Insecta
- Order: Lepidoptera
- Superfamily: Noctuoidea
- Family: Erebidae
- Genus: Euphiuche
- Species: E. picta

Binomial name
- Euphiuche picta (Moore, 1882)

Synonyms
- Bocana picta Moore, 1882; Catada picta Poole

= Euphiuche picta =

Species of moth

Euphiuche picta is a species of moth of the family Noctuidae first described by Frederic Moore in 1882. It is known from India, Thailand, Peninsular Malaysia, Sumatra, Java, Borneo and Sulawesi.
