= Pseudoedaleosia =

Scientific classification
- Domain: Eukaryota
- Kingdom: Animalia
- Phylum: Arthropoda
- Class: Insecta
- Order: Lepidoptera
- Superfamily: Noctuoidea
- Family: Noctuidae
- Genus: Pseudoedaleosia; Strand, 1924

Genus of moths

Pseudoedaleosia is a genus of moth in the family Noctuidae.

== Species ==
- Pseudoedaleosia scoparioides Strand, 1924
