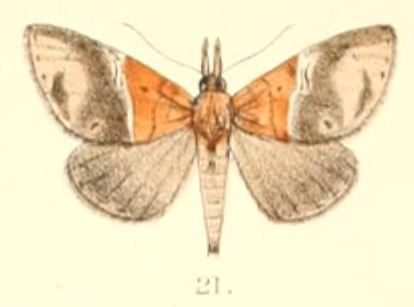
- Euphiuche picta

Scientific classification
- Kingdom: Animalia
- Phylum: Arthropoda
- Clade: Pancrustacea
- Class: Insecta
- Order: Lepidoptera
- Superfamily: Noctuoidea
- Family: Erebidae
- Subfamily: Hypeninae
- Genus: Euphiuche; Holloway, 2008

= Euphiuche =

Genus of moths

Euphiuche is a genus of moths of the family Erebidae. The genus was erected by Jeremy Daniel Holloway in 2008.

== Species ==
- Euphiuche picta (Moore, 1882)
- Euphiuche apoblepta (Turner, 1908)
