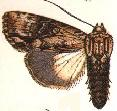
- Dipterygia babooni

Scientific classification
- Kingdom: Animalia
- Phylum: Arthropoda
- Clade: Pancrustacea
- Class: Insecta
- Order: Lepidoptera
- Superfamily: Noctuoidea
- Family: Noctuidae
- Genus: Dipterygina; Sugi, 1954

= Dipterygina =

Genus of moths

Dipterygina is a genus of moths of the family Noctuidae.

== Species ==
- Dipterygina babooni (Bethune-Baker, 1906)
- Dipterygina cupreotincta Sugi, 1954
- Dipterygina dorsipallens (Holloway, 1976)
- Dipterygina indica (Moore, 1867)
- Dipterygina japonica (Leech, 1889)
- Dipterygina kebeae (Bethune-Baker, 1906)
- Dipterygina major Holloway, 1989
- Dipterygina obscurior (Warren, 1913)
- Dipterygina vagivitta (Walker, 1862)
