= Austrazenia tusa =

Scientific classification
- Domain: Eukaryota
- Kingdom: Animalia
- Phylum: Arthropoda
- Class: Insecta
- Order: Lepidoptera
- Superfamily: Noctuoidea
- Family: Noctuidae
- Genus: Austrazenia
- Species: A. tusa

Binomial name
- Austrazenia tusa (C. Swinhoe, 1902)

Synonyms
- Megalodes tusa C. Swinhoe, 1902

Species of moth

Austrazenia tusa is a moth of the family Noctuidae first described by Charles Swinhoe in 1902. It is found in Australia.
