= Ecnomia =

Scientific classification
- Domain: Eukaryota
- Kingdom: Animalia
- Phylum: Arthropoda
- Class: Insecta
- Order: Lepidoptera
- Superfamily: Noctuoidea
- Family: Noctuidae
- Subfamily: Acontiinae
- Genus: Ecnomia; Turner, 1936
- Species: E. hesychima

Binomial name
- Ecnomia hesychima Turner, 1936

Synonyms
- Generic: Asaphes Turner, 1945; Paventia Rossi, 1958; Specific: Asaphes asemantica Turner, 1945

Genus of moths

Ecnomia is a monotypic moth genus of the family Noctuidae. Its only species, Ecnomia hesychima, is found in Australia in Western Australia, the Northern Territory and Queensland. Both the genus and species were first described by Turner in 1936.
