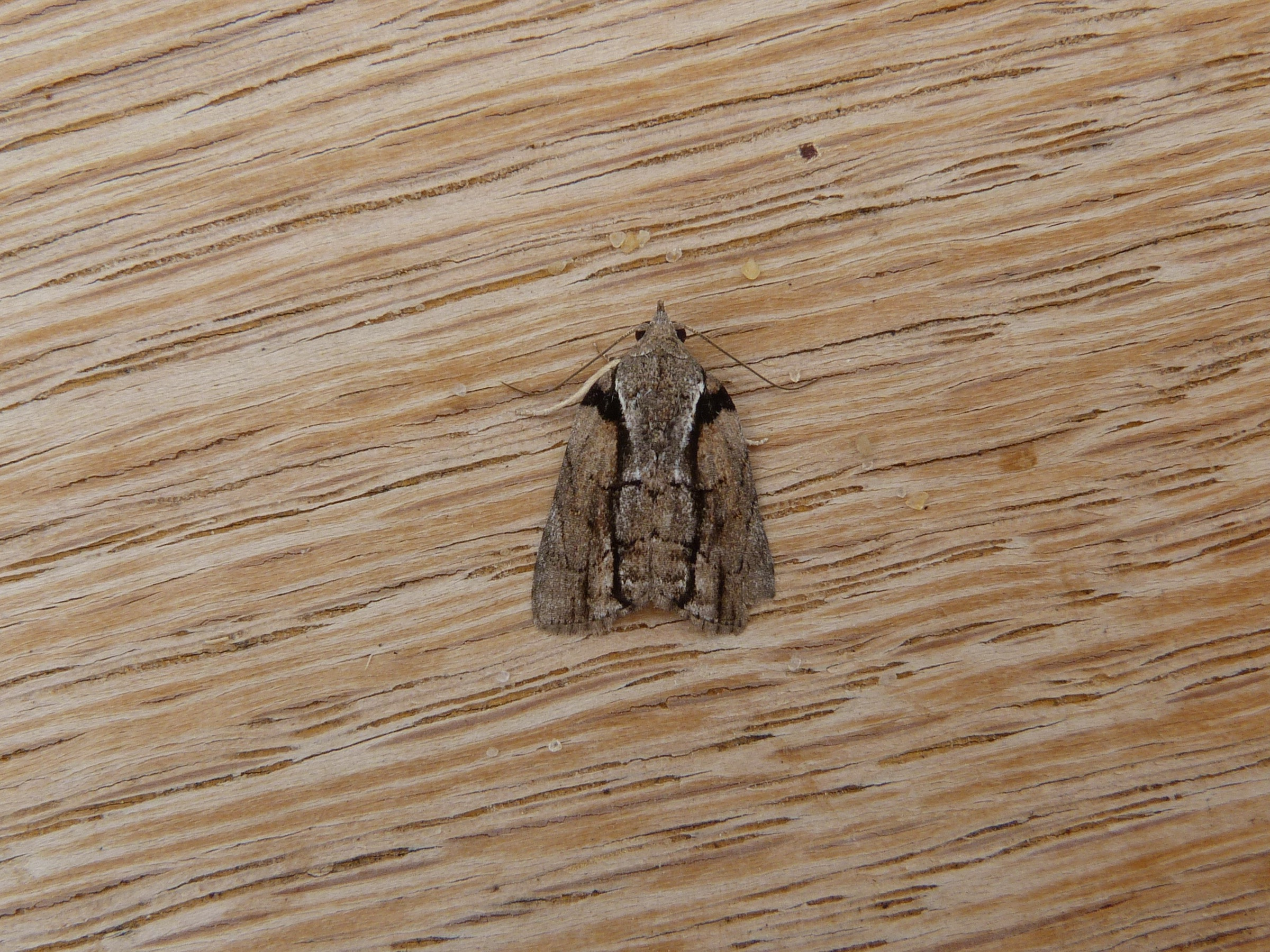

Scientific classification
- Kingdom: Animalia
- Phylum: Arthropoda
- Class: Insecta
- Order: Lepidoptera
- Superfamily: Noctuoidea
- Family: Nolidae
- Genus: Etanna
- Species: E. clopaea

Binomial name
- Etanna clopaea (Turner, 1902)

Synonyms
- Dendrothripa clopaea Turner, 1902; Nanaguna clopaea

= Etanna clopaea =

Species of moth

Etanna clopaea is a species of moth of the family Nolidae first described by Turner in 1902. It is found in Australia, including Queensland, New South Wales and the Australian Capital Territory.
