= Pseudoedaleosia scoparioides =

Scientific classification
- Domain: Eukaryota
- Kingdom: Animalia
- Phylum: Arthropoda
- Class: Insecta
- Order: Lepidoptera
- Superfamily: Noctuoidea
- Family: Noctuidae
- Genus: Pseudoedaleosia
- Species: P. scoparioides

Binomial name
- Pseudoedaleosia scoparioides Strand, 1924

Species of moth

Pseudoedaleosia scoparioides is a moth of the family Noctuidae. It is found in Western Australia.
