= Xenopseustis =

Scientific classification
- Kingdom: Animalia
- Phylum: Arthropoda
- Class: Insecta
- Order: Lepidoptera
- Superfamily: Noctuoidea
- Family: Noctuidae
- Subfamily: Acontiinae
- Genus: Xenopseustis; Meyrick, 1897
- Species: X. poecilastis

Binomial name
- Xenopseustis poecilastis Meyrick, 1897

Genus of moths

Xenopseustis is a monotypic moth genus of the family Noctuidae. Its only species, Xenopseustis poecilastis, is found in the Australian state of Queensland. Both the genus and species were first described by Edward Meyrick in 1897.
