= Eugatha =

Scientific classification
- Kingdom: Animalia
- Phylum: Arthropoda
- Class: Insecta
- Order: Lepidoptera
- Superfamily: Noctuoidea
- Family: Noctuidae
- Subfamily: Acontiinae
- Genus: Eugatha; Hampson, 1911
- Species: E. thermochroa

Binomial name
- Eugatha thermochroa Hampson, 1911

Genus of moths

Eugatha is a monotypic moth genus of the family Noctuidae. Its only species, Eugatha thermochroa, is found in New Guinea and the Australian state of Queensland. Both the genus and species were first described by George Hampson in 1911.
