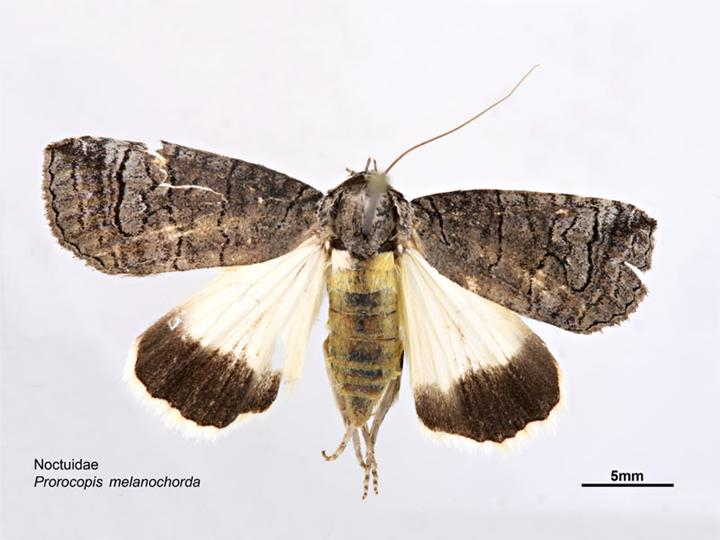
- Dorsal view
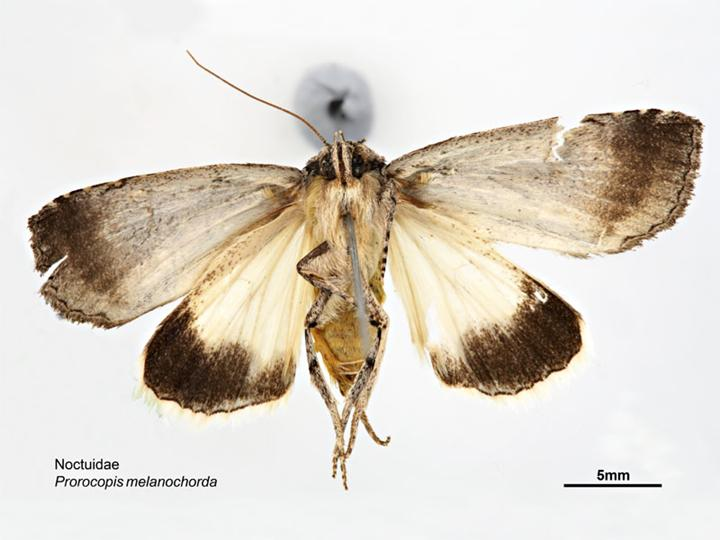
- Ventral view

Scientific classification
- Kingdom: Animalia
- Phylum: Arthropoda
- Class: Insecta
- Order: Lepidoptera
- Superfamily: Noctuoidea
- Family: Noctuidae
- Genus: Prorocopis
- Species: P. melanochorda

Binomial name
- Prorocopis melanochorda Meyrick, 1897

= Prorocopis melanochorda =

Species of moth

Prorocopis melanochorda is a moth of the family Noctuidae first described by Edward Meyrick in 1897. It is found in Australia.
