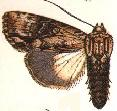

Scientific classification
- Domain: Eukaryota
- Kingdom: Animalia
- Phylum: Arthropoda
- Class: Insecta
- Order: Lepidoptera
- Superfamily: Noctuoidea
- Family: Noctuidae
- Genus: Dipterygina
- Species: D. babooni

Binomial name
- Dipterygina babooni Bethune-Baker, 1906

Synonyms
- Acronycta anceps Turner, A.J. 1944; Dipterygia babooni; Acronicta anceps

= Dipterygina babooni =

Species of moth

Dipterygina babooni is a moth of the family Noctuidae. It is found in New South Wales, Queensland and Papua New Guinea.
