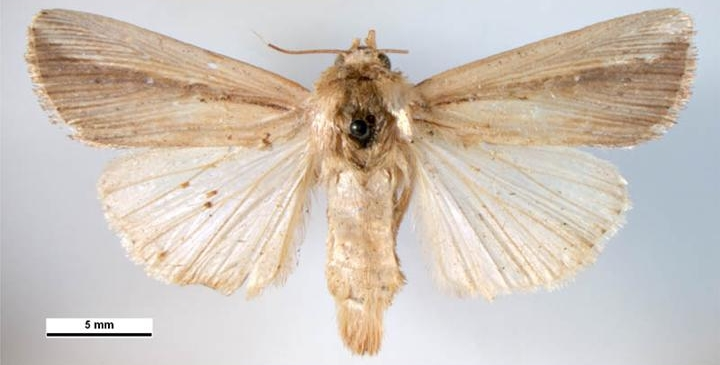
- Dorsal view
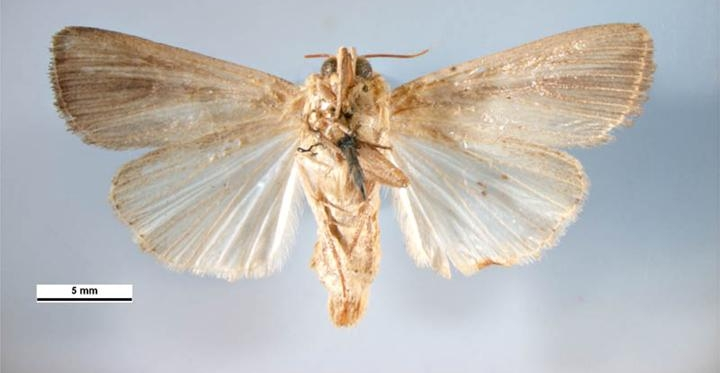
- Ventral view

Scientific classification
- Domain: Eukaryota
- Kingdom: Animalia
- Phylum: Arthropoda
- Class: Insecta
- Order: Lepidoptera
- Superfamily: Noctuoidea
- Family: Noctuidae
- Genus: Leucania
- Species: L. loreyi

Binomial name
- Leucania loreyi (Duponchel, 1827)

Synonyms
- Acantholeucania loreyi (Duponchel, 1827); Noctua loreyi Duponchel, 1827; Leucania caricis Treitschke, 1835; Leucania collecta Walker, 1856; Leucania curvula Walker, 1856; Leucania denotata Walker, 1856; Leucania designata Walker, 1856; Leucania exterior Walker, 1856; Leucania thoracica Walker, 1856; Borolia melanostrotoides Strand, 1915; Leucania pseudoloreyi Rungs, 1953; Leucania melanostrotoides; Mythimna loreyi

= Leucania loreyi =

False army worm

Species of moth

Leucania loreyi, the cosmopolitan, false army worm or nightfeeding rice armyworm, is a species of moth in the family Noctuidae. It is found in most of African countries, the Indo-Australian subtropics and tropics of India, Sri Lanka, Myanmar, the eastern Palearctic realm, and the Near East and Middle East. The species was first described by Philogène Auguste Joseph Duponchel in 1827.

== Description ==
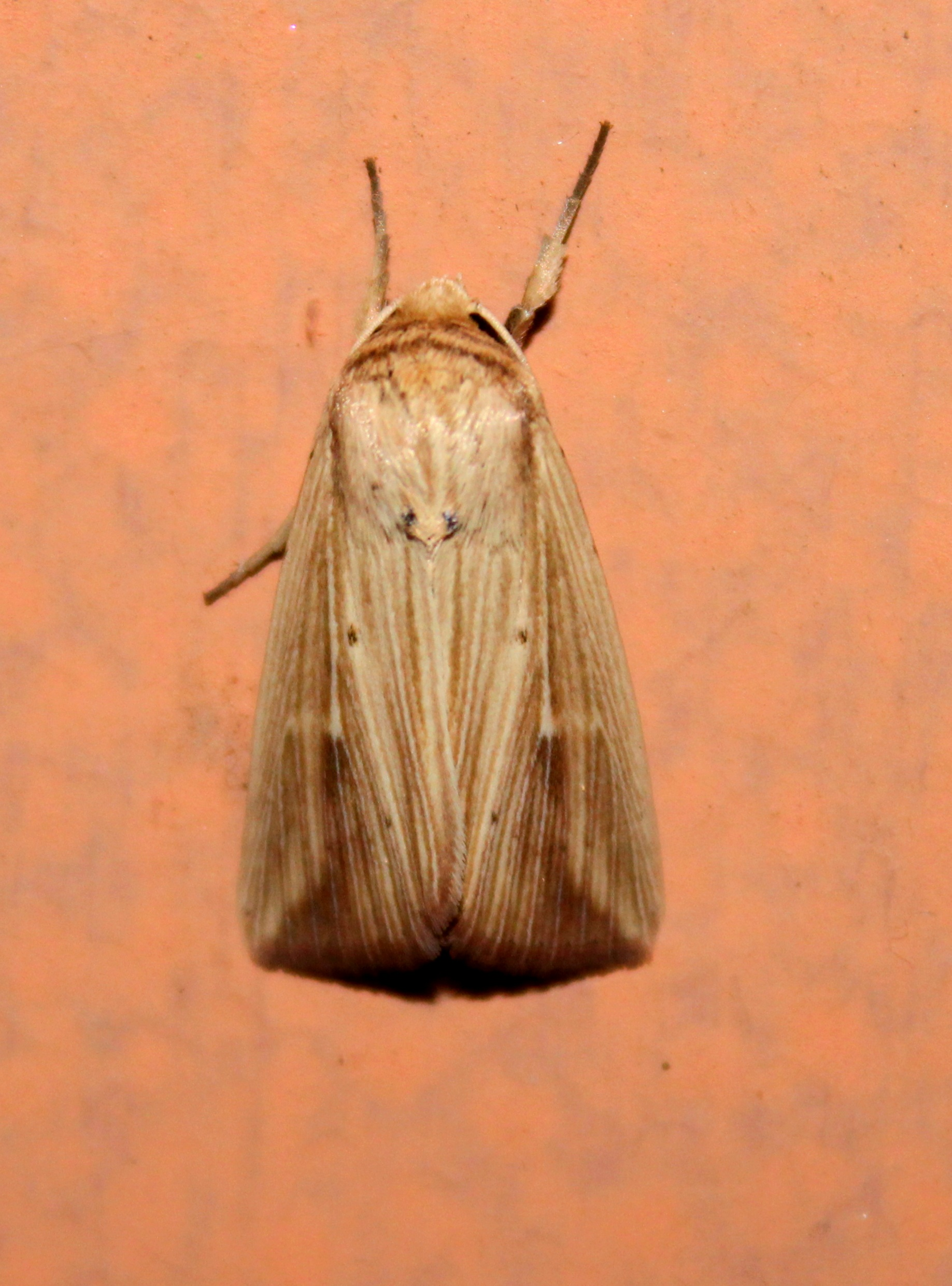
in Sri Lanka

Its wingspan is about 34–44 mm. Forewing greyish ochreous; the veins pale lined with brown, the intervals with brown lines; a short black streak from base below cell; median nervure thickly outlined with fuscous to beyond cell; reniform stigma indicated by a white dot at lower angle of cell; outer line by a row of black dots on veins; a triangular brown subapical patch edged above by an oblique pale streak from apex; hindwing white, the veins towards termen fuscous; abdominal tufts beneath formed of coarse scalelike brown black hairs.

== Ecology ==
The larva is reddish grey, and yellowish between the segments and the dorsal line is fine, grey, and double. The subdorsal lines are divided, interrupted, and all clearer towards the anal segments. spiracles black-ringed. Adults are on wing year round. There are multiple generations per year.

Recorded food plants in Israel include Phragmites australis, Sacharum ravennae and Gramineae species.
