= Noctua microrrhoea =

Scientific classification
- Kingdom: Animalia
- Phylum: Arthropoda
- Class: Insecta
- Order: Lepidoptera
- Superfamily: Noctuoidea
- Family: Noctuidae
- Genus: Noctua
- Species: N. microrrhoea

Binomial name
- Noctua microrrhoea Fabricius, 1775

Synonyms
- Dermaleipa microrrhoea (Fabricius, 1775); Thyas microrrhoea (Fabricius, 1775); Lagoptera orbifera Walker, 1858; Thyas orbifera (Walker, 1858); Dermaleipa metaxantha Hampson, 1913; Thyas metaxantha (Hampson, 1913); Dermaleipa microrhoea elliptimacula Strand, 1914; Dermaleipa elliptimacula Strand, 1914

Species of moth

Noctua microrrhoea is a species of moth in the family Erebidae. The species is found in Australia (Western Australia, Northern Territory, and Queensland).

There is no widely accepted taxonomic placement for this species. Noctua microrrhoea is the original name proposed by Johan Christian Fabricius in 1775 and used by the Global Lepidoptera Index. While the Australian Faunal Directory treats its genus as uncertain but within Erebinae, other sources place it in Thyas or in Dermaleipa.

== Description ==
Noctua microrrhoea is a large moth with a wingspan about 7 cm (2.8 in). The forewings are dorsally brown. The hindwings are dorsally bright orange with broad black margins and a large black spot in the middle. The abdomen is orange. The larvae feed on Terminalia ferdinandiana.

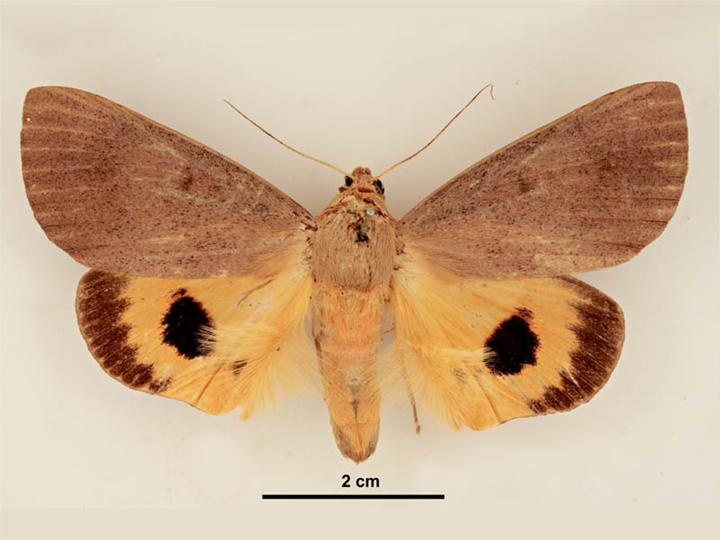
Male, dorsal view

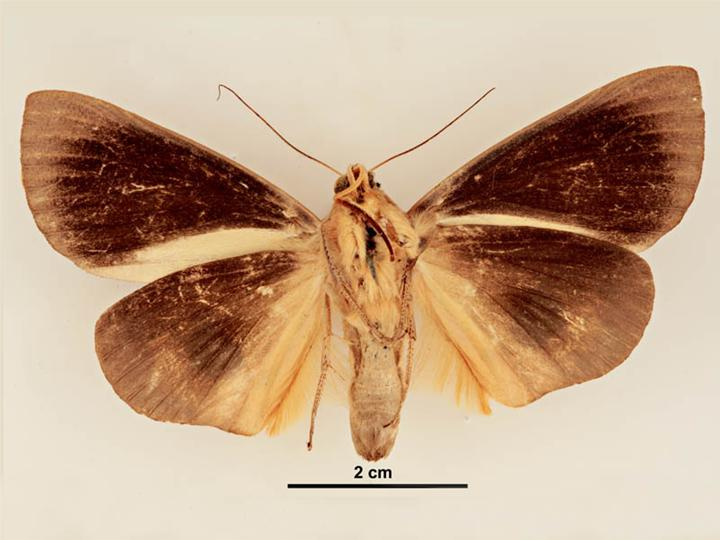
Male, ventral view

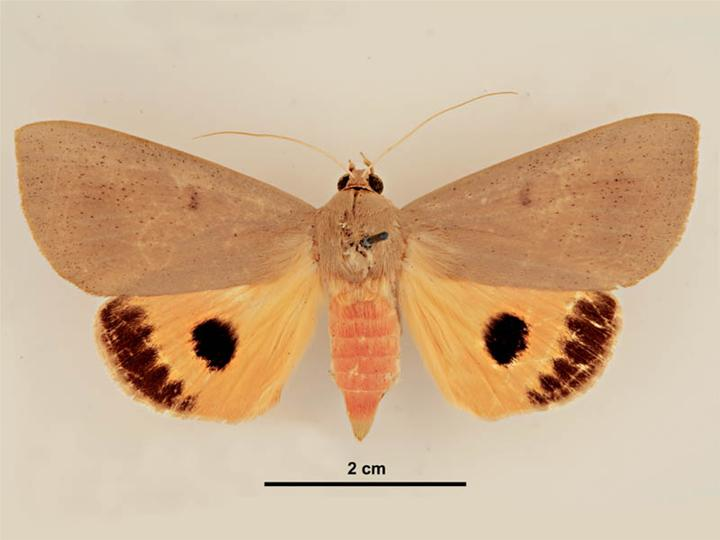
Female, dorsal view

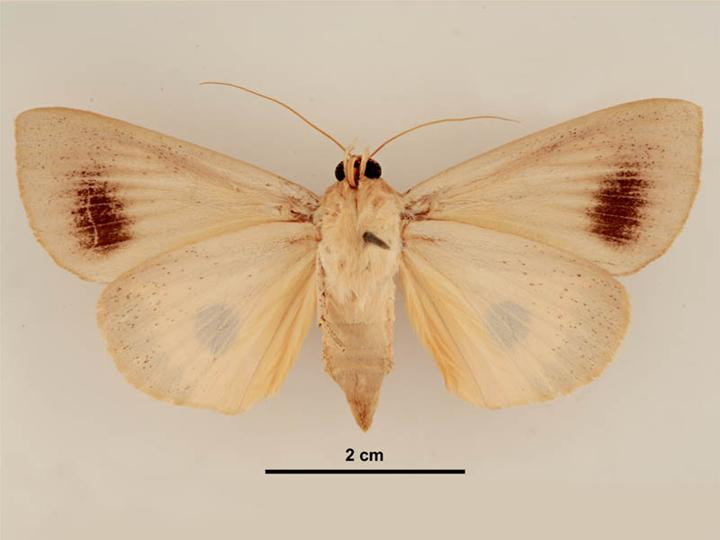
Female, ventral view
