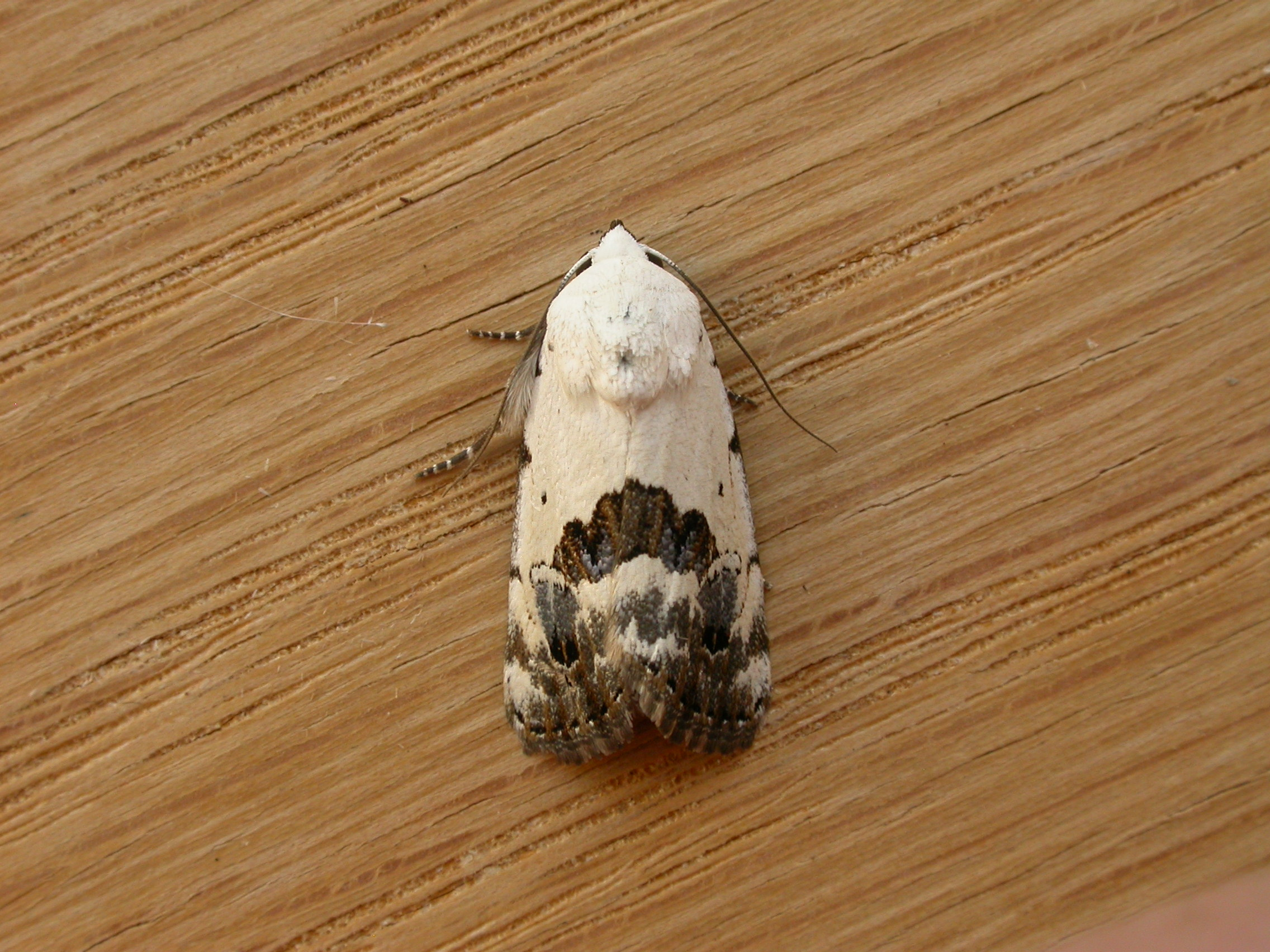

Scientific classification
- Kingdom: Animalia
- Phylum: Arthropoda
- Class: Insecta
- Order: Lepidoptera
- Superfamily: Noctuoidea
- Family: Nolidae
- Genus: Armactica
- Species: A. conchidia

Binomial name
- Armactica conchidia Butler, 1886

= Armactica conchidia =

Species of moth

Armactica conchidia, the conchidia moth, is a moth of the family Nolidae first described by Arthur Gardiner Butler in 1886. It is found in Australia.
