= Euphiuche apoblepta =

Scientific classification
- Kingdom: Animalia
- Phylum: Arthropoda
- Clade: Pancrustacea
- Class: Insecta
- Order: Lepidoptera
- Superfamily: Noctuoidea
- Family: Erebidae
- Genus: Euphiuche
- Species: E. apoblepta

Binomial name
- Euphiuche apoblepta (Turner, 1908)

Synonyms
- Catada apoblepta Turner, 1908

Species of moth

Euphiuche apoblepta is a species of moth of the family Erebidae first described by Turner in 1908. It is known from the Australian state of Queensland.
