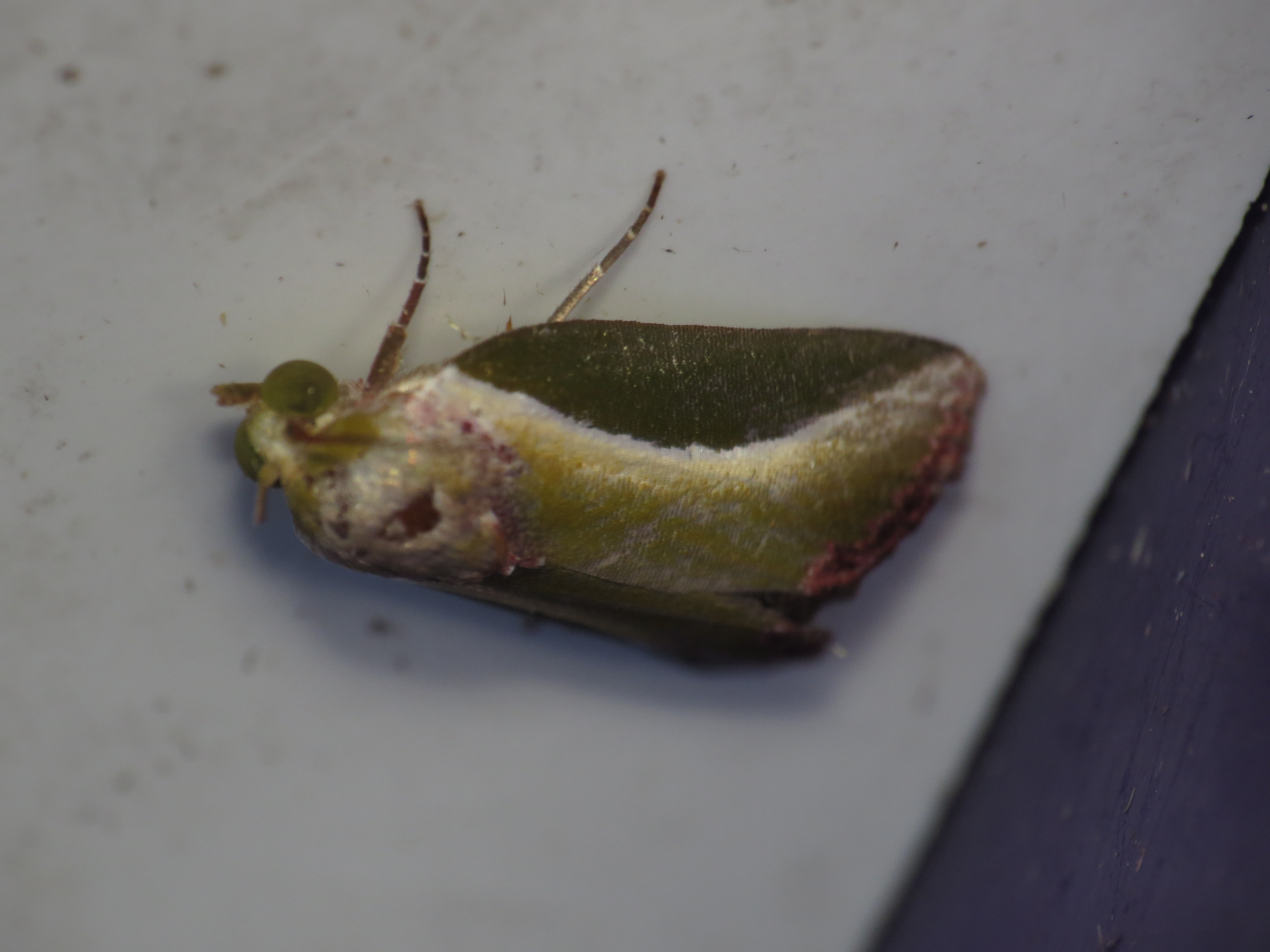

Scientific classification
- Kingdom: Animalia
- Phylum: Arthropoda
- Class: Insecta
- Order: Lepidoptera
- Superfamily: Noctuoidea
- Family: Nolidae
- Genus: Ariola
- Species: A. coelisigna

Binomial name
- Ariola coelisigna Walker, 1858

= Ariola coelisigna =

Species of moth

Ariola coelisigna is a moth of the family Noctuidae. It is found from the Himalayas, Sri Lanka to southern China, Peninsular Malaysia, Sumatra, Borneo and east to the Solomon Islands. In Australia it is found in the rainforests from Cape York to the Atherton Tableland in Queensland.

== Description ==
Its wingspan is 22 mm. The head and thorax are pale green. Abdomen fuscous. Forewings bright green, with a curved silvery-white fascia from the base to apex. Outer margin pinkish, with black marginal marks and line. Hindwings fuscous.

== Taxonomy ==
Ariola ransonneti Felder & Rogenhofer, 1874 was placed as a synonym of coelisigna in Poole (1989), it is now treated as a valid species.
