= Thaumasiodes =

Scientific classification
- Domain: Eukaryota
- Kingdom: Animalia
- Phylum: Arthropoda
- Class: Insecta
- Order: Lepidoptera
- Superfamily: Noctuoidea
- Family: Noctuidae
- Subfamily: Acontiinae
- Genus: Thaumasiodes; Turner, 1939
- Species: T. eurymitra

Binomial name
- Thaumasiodes eurymitra Turner, 1939

Genus of moths

Thaumasiodes is a monotypic moth genus of the family Noctuidae. Its only species, Thaumasiodes eurymitra, is found in the Australian state of Queensland. Both the genus and species were first described by Turner in 1939.
