= Habrophyes =

Scientific classification
- Domain: Eukaryota
- Kingdom: Animalia
- Phylum: Arthropoda
- Class: Insecta
- Order: Lepidoptera
- Superfamily: Noctuoidea
- Family: Noctuidae
- Subfamily: Acontiinae
- Genus: Habrophyes; Turner, 1920
- Species: H. xuthosoma

Binomial name
- Habrophyes xuthosoma (Turner, 1909)

Synonyms
- Tarache xuthosoma Turner, 1909; Eugoa fascirrorata Rothschild, 1913

Genus of moths

Habrophyes is a monotypic moth genus of the family Noctuidae. Its only species, Habrophyes xuthosoma, is found in Australia where it is found in the Northern Territory and Queensland. Both the genus and species were first described by Alfred Jefferis Turner, the genus in 1920 and the species 11 years earlier in 1909.

The wingspan is about 20 mm. Adults have white forewings with two black bands. The hindwings are grey.
