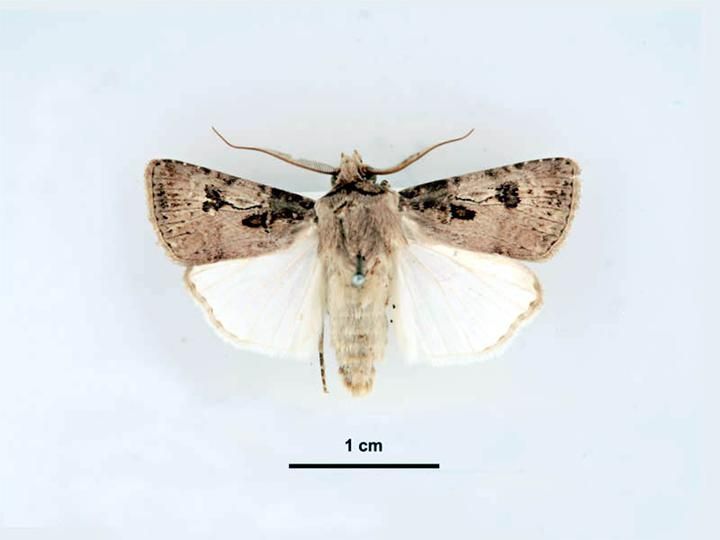

Scientific classification
- Kingdom: Animalia
- Phylum: Arthropoda
- Clade: Pancrustacea
- Class: Insecta
- Order: Lepidoptera
- Superfamily: Noctuoidea
- Family: Noctuidae
- Genus: Agrotis
- Species: A. interjectionis

Binomial name
- Agrotis interjectionis (Guenée, 1852)

Synonyms
- Agrotis interjectionis Guenée, 1852; Agrotis orbicularis Walker, 1865; Agrotis significans Walker, 1865; Euxoa vertenteni Hulstaert, 1923; Euxoa interjectionis

= Agrotis interjectionis =

Species of moth

Agrotis interjectionis is a moth of the family Noctuidae. It is found in the Northern Territory of Australia, Malaysia and from Sumatra, Java and Sulawesi to Vanuatu.

The larvae are considered a pest on a wide range of tropical crops in South-East Asia, including Saccharum officinarum, Zea mays, Elaeis guineensis, Nicotiana tabacum, Arachis hypogaea, Sesamum, Hibiscus sabdariffa, Gossypium and Allium.
