= Alypophanes iridocosma =

Scientific classification
- Domain: Eukaryota
- Kingdom: Animalia
- Phylum: Arthropoda
- Class: Insecta
- Order: Lepidoptera
- Superfamily: Noctuoidea
- Family: Noctuidae
- Genus: Alypophanes
- Species: A. iridocosma

Binomial name
- Alypophanes iridocosma Turner, 1908

Species of moth

Alypophanes iridocosma is a moth of the family Noctuidae. It is found in Queensland (in rainforest from Iron Range south to Ingham).
