= Epopsima =

Scientific classification
- Domain: Eukaryota
- Kingdom: Animalia
- Phylum: Arthropoda
- Class: Insecta
- Order: Lepidoptera
- Superfamily: Noctuoidea
- Family: Noctuidae
- Subfamily: Acontiinae
- Genus: Epopsima; Turner, 1920
- Species: E. fasciolata

Binomial name
- Epopsima fasciolata (Butler, 1886)

Genus of moths

Epopsima is a monotypic moth genus of the family Noctuidae described by Turner in 1920. Its only species, Epopsima fasciolata, was first described by Arthur Gardiner Butler in 1886. It is found in Australia in Western Australia, the Northern Territory, Queensland, and New South Wales.
