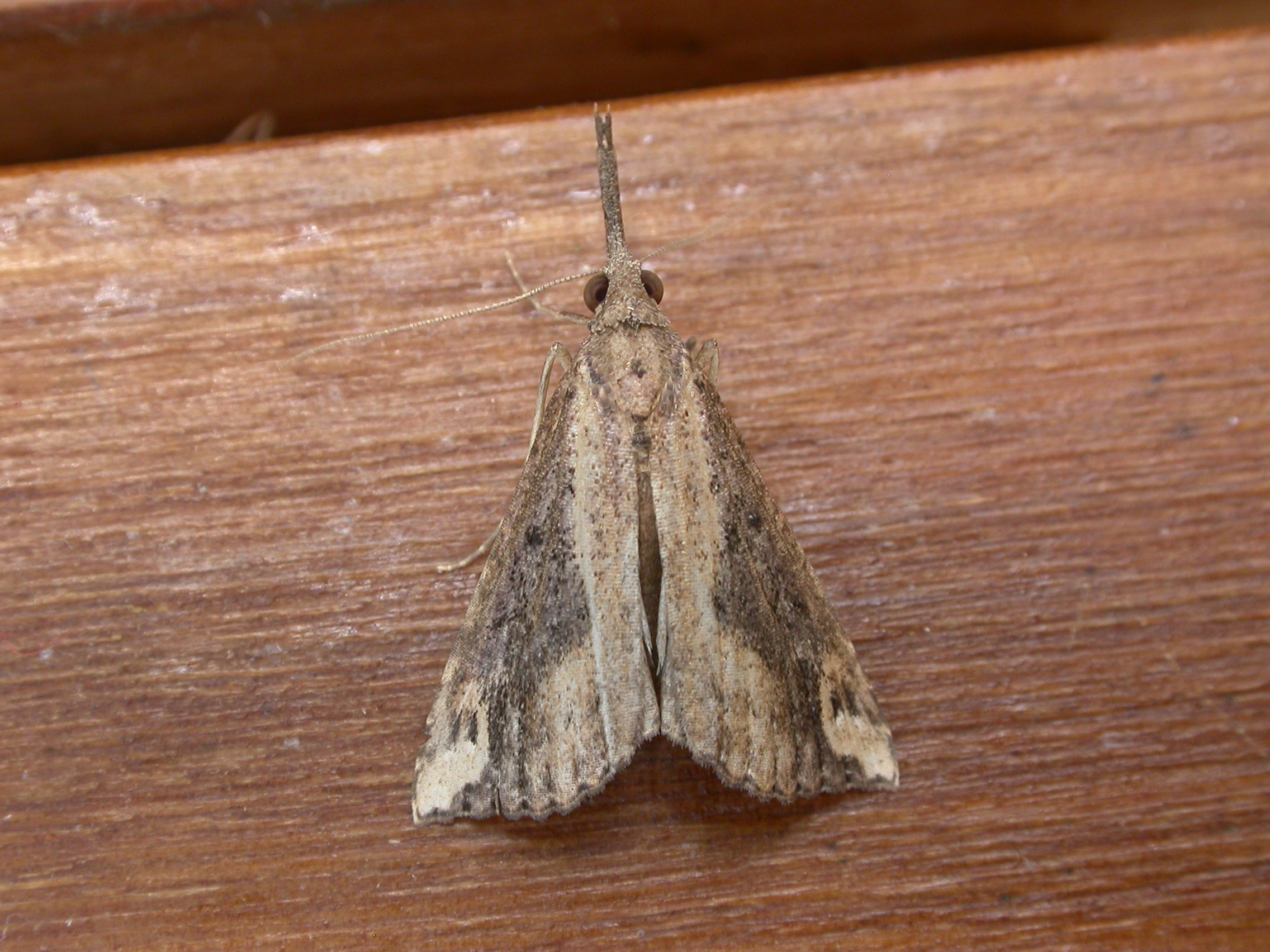

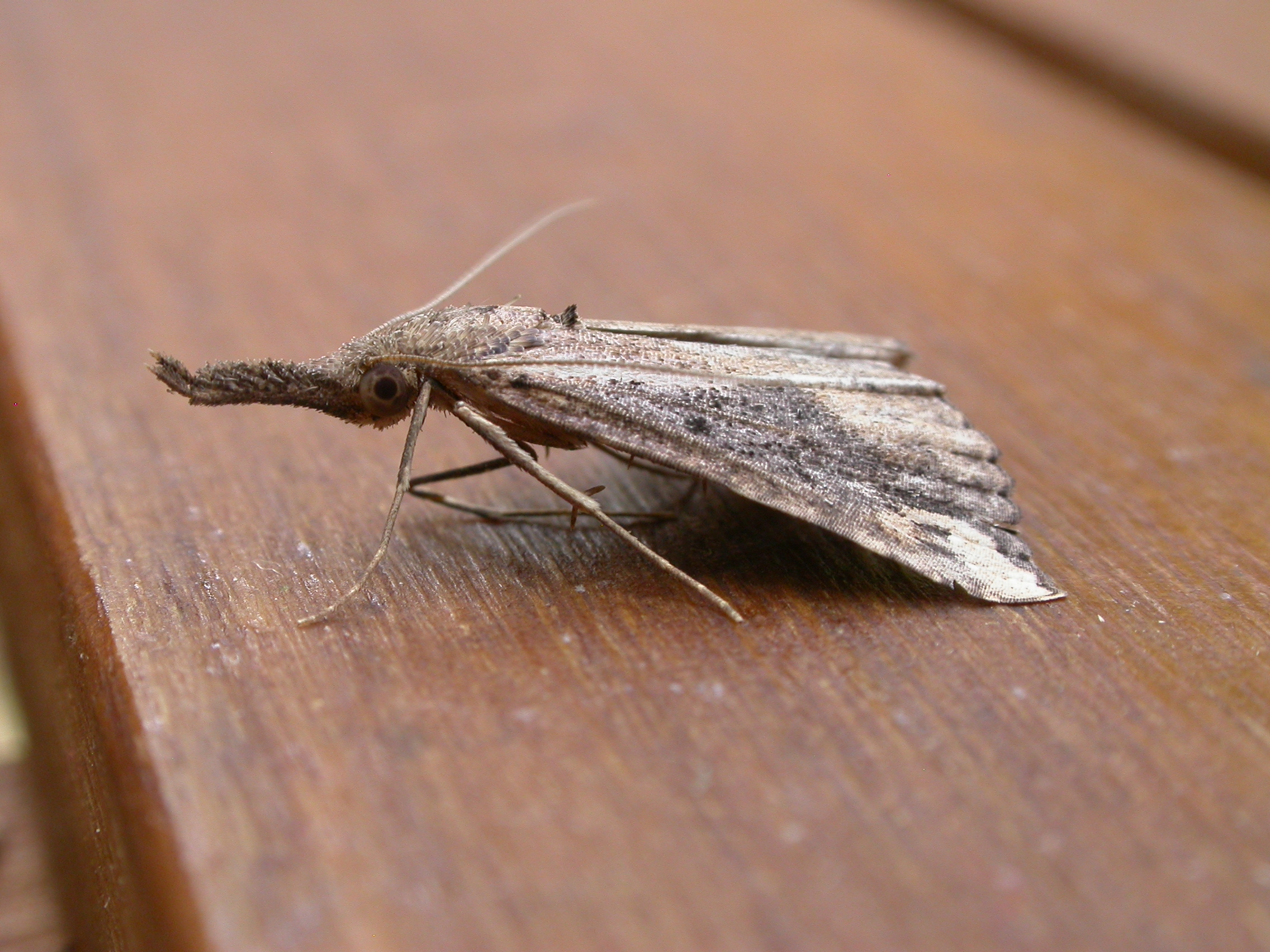

Scientific classification
- Kingdom: Animalia
- Phylum: Arthropoda
- Clade: Pancrustacea
- Class: Insecta
- Order: Lepidoptera
- Superfamily: Noctuoidea
- Family: Erebidae
- Genus: Hypena
- Species: H. labatalis

Binomial name
- Hypena labatalis Walker, [1859]

= Hypena labatalis =

Species of moth

Hypena labatalis is a species of moth in the family Erebidae. It was first described by the English entomologist Francis Walker in 1859. It belongs to the genus Hypena, a large genus of moths in the subfamily Hypeninae.

The species has been recorded from India, Sri Lanka, parts of Southeast Asia, and Australia, including Queensland.

== Description ==
Its wingspan is about 28 mm. Forewings much broader. The outer margin less oblique. Raised tufts are slight. Palpi very long and they are pale or dark greyish reddish brown. Forewings with a dark speck in the cell and another at the end of it. A very indistinct postmedial line which is highly angled beyond the cell, where it is met by the long curved apical white streak, which has two dark spots in its bend. Ventral side of forewings with pale costa, which speckled with fuscous and with a subapical black and white spot. Hindwings pale with dark specks and cell spot.

== Distribution ==
Hypena labatalis has been recorded in India and Sri Lanka. It has also been recorded elsewhere in Southeast Asia, including Thailand. In Australia, the species is known from Queensland.

A specimen photographed at Mission Beach, Queensland, provides a documented Australian record of the species.

== Taxonomy ==
Hypena labatalis was described by Francis Walker in 1859. The type locality was recorded as Ceylon, the former name for Sri Lanka. The original description was published in the sixteenth part of List of the Specimens of Lepidopterous Insects in the Collection of the British Museum.

The species is classified in the following hierarchy:

Kingdom: Animalia

Phylum: Arthropoda

Class: Insecta

Order: Lepidoptera

Superfamily: Noctuoidea

Family: Erebidae

Subfamily: Hypeninae

Genus: Hypena

Species: H. labatalis
