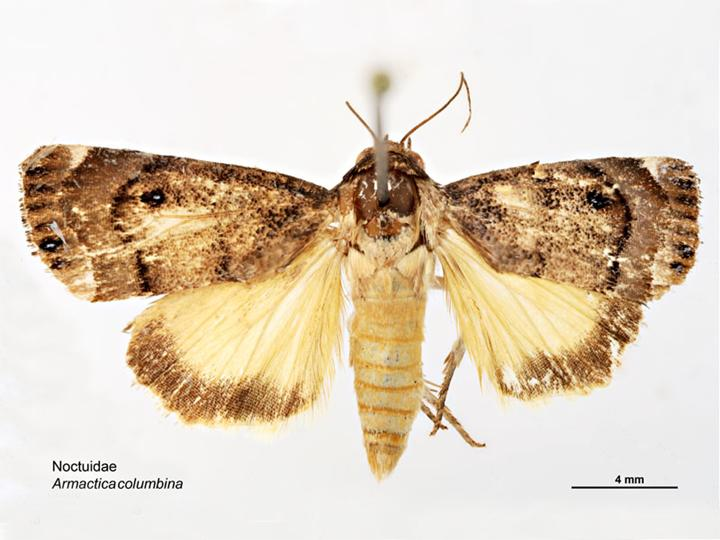
- Dorsal view
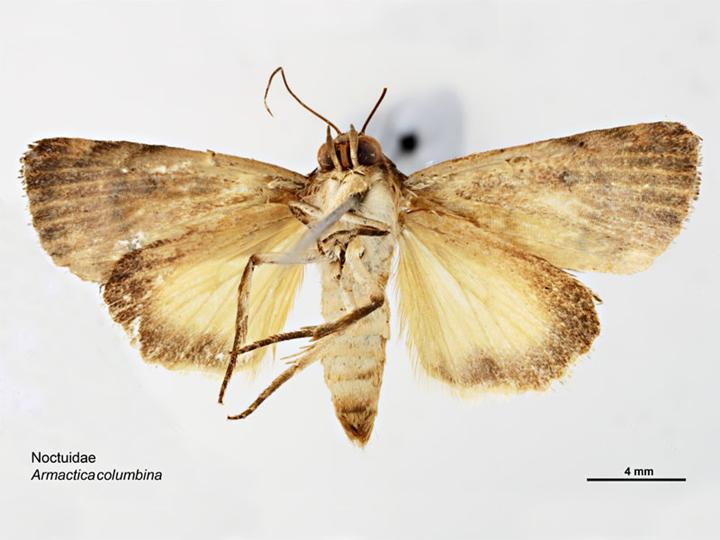
- Ventral view

Scientific classification
- Kingdom: Animalia
- Phylum: Arthropoda
- Class: Insecta
- Order: Lepidoptera
- Superfamily: Noctuoidea
- Family: Nolidae
- Genus: Armactica
- Species: A. columbina

Binomial name
- Armactica columbina Walker, 1865

= Armactica columbina =

Species of moth

Armactica columbina is a moth of the family Nolidae first described by Francis Walker in 1865. It is found in the Australian states of New South Wales, Queensland and the north of Western Australia.

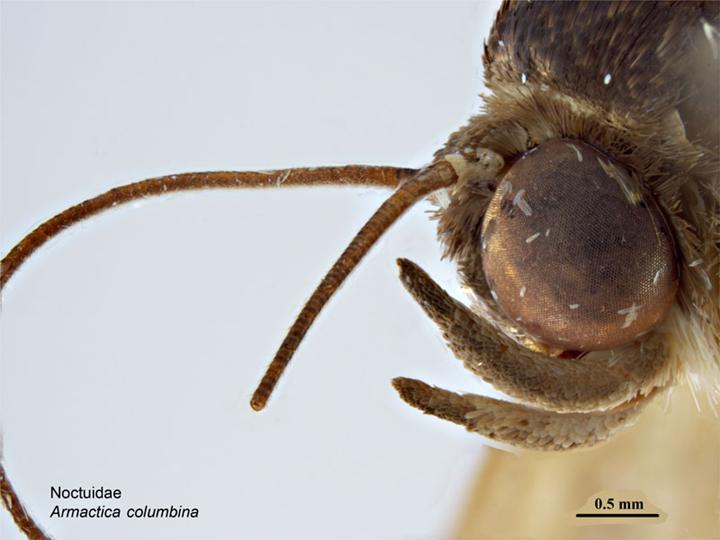
Head

The wingspan is about 20 mm.

The larvae have been recorded feeding on Cordia subcordata.
