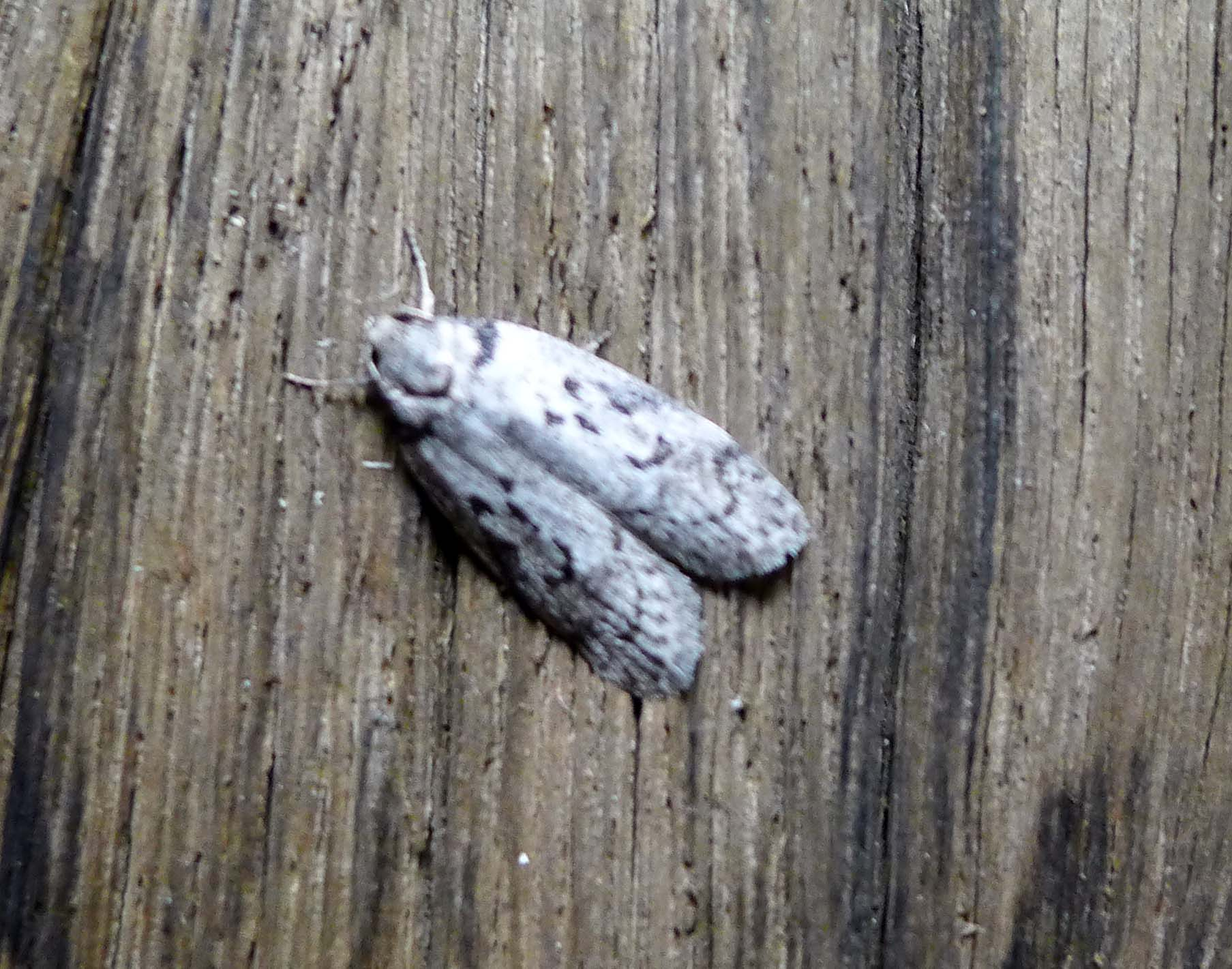

Scientific classification
- Kingdom: Animalia
- Phylum: Arthropoda
- Class: Insecta
- Order: Lepidoptera
- Superfamily: Noctuoidea
- Family: Nolidae
- Genus: Giaura
- Species: G. punctata

Binomial name
- Giaura punctata (T. P. Lucas, 1890)

Synonyms
- Sarotricha punctata T. P. Lucas, 1890; Philenora murina Rothschild, 1916

= Giaura punctata =

Species of moth

Giaura punctata is a moth in the family Nolidae. It was described by Thomas Pennington Lucas in 1890. It is found on the Bismarck Islands and on New Guinea and Australia (Northern Territory and Queensland).

The wingspan is about 20 mm.
