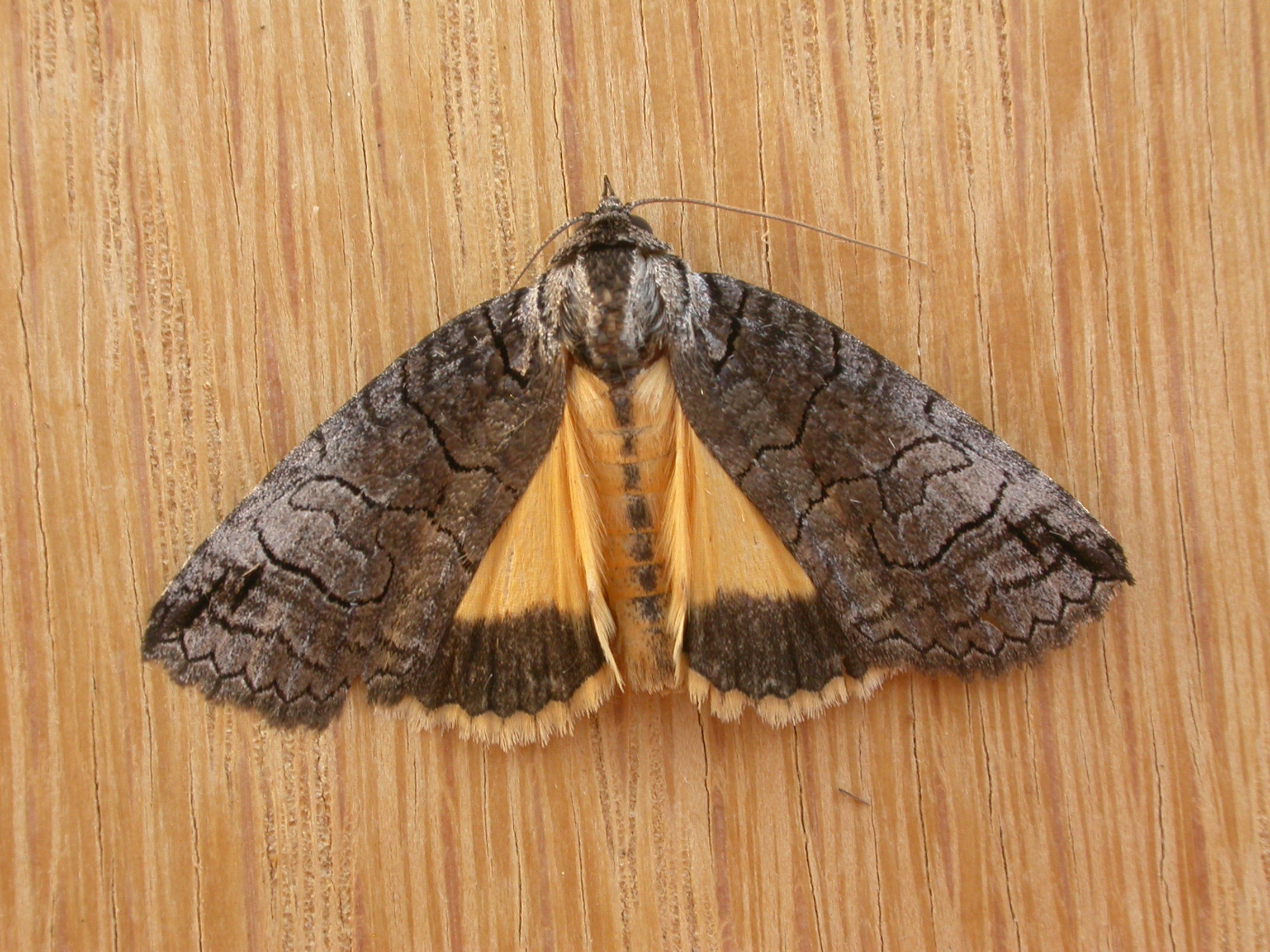

Scientific classification
- Domain: Eukaryota
- Kingdom: Animalia
- Phylum: Arthropoda
- Class: Insecta
- Order: Lepidoptera
- Superfamily: Noctuoidea
- Family: Noctuidae
- Genus: Prorocopis
- Species: P. euxantha

Binomial name
- Prorocopis euxantha Lower, 1902

= Prorocopis euxantha =

Species of moth

Prorocopis euxantha, the golden crest, is a moth of the family Noctuidae. The species was first described by Oswald Bertram Lower in 1902. It is found in most of Australia.

The wingspan is about 30 mm.
