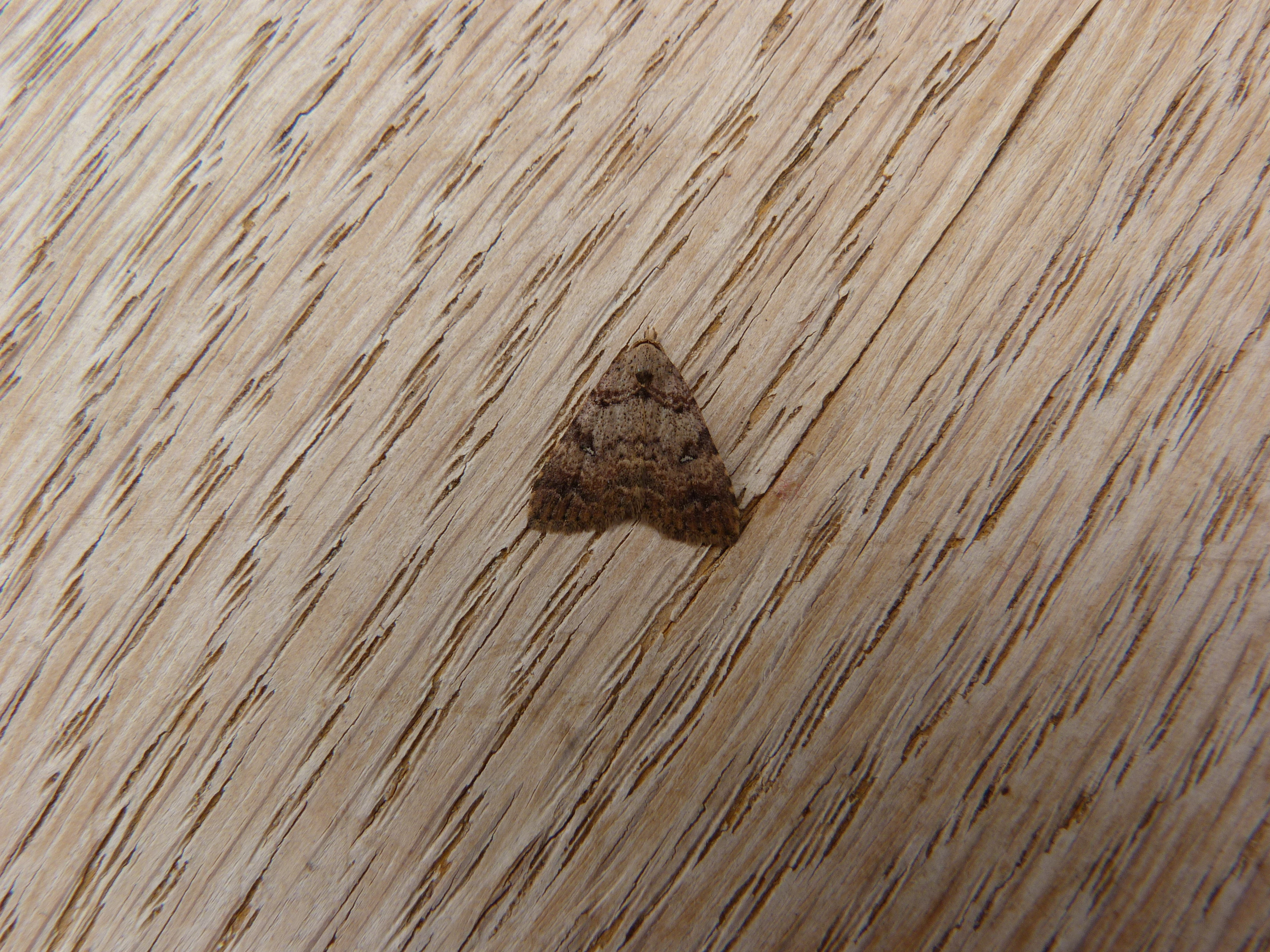

Scientific classification
- Kingdom: Animalia
- Phylum: Arthropoda
- Class: Insecta
- Order: Lepidoptera
- Superfamily: Noctuoidea
- Family: Noctuidae (?)
- Genus: Alapadna
- Species: A. pauropis

Binomial name
- Alapadna pauropis Turner, 1902

Synonyms
- Hypenodes ptocas Turner, 1944

= Alapadna pauropis =

Species of moth

Alapadna pauropis, the variable spot-wing, is a species of moth of the family Erebidae, first described by Alfred Jefferis Turner in 1902. It is found in the Australian states of Queensland, New South Wales, Victoria and Tasmania.

Adults are brown with a variable pattern of dark lines and spots.
