= Pseudephyra =

Scientific classification
- Domain: Eukaryota
- Kingdom: Animalia
- Phylum: Arthropoda
- Class: Insecta
- Order: Lepidoptera
- Superfamily: Noctuoidea
- Family: Noctuidae
- Subfamily: Acontiinae
- Genus: Pseudephyra; Butler, 1886
- Species: P. straminea

Binomial name
- Pseudephyra straminea Butler, 1886

Genus of moths

Pseudephyra is a genus of moths of the family Noctuidae. Is only species, Pseudephyra straminea, is found in Australia. Both the genus and species were first described by Arthur Gardiner Butler in 1886.

Butterflies and Moths of the World gives this name as a synonym of Corgatha Walker, 1859.
