= Microedma =

Scientific classification
- Domain: Eukaryota
- Kingdom: Animalia
- Phylum: Arthropoda
- Class: Insecta
- Order: Lepidoptera
- Superfamily: Noctuoidea
- Family: Noctuidae
- Subfamily: Acontiinae
- Genus: Microedma; Warren in Seitz, 1913
- Species: M. extorris

Binomial name
- Microedma extorris Warren, 1913

Genus of moths

Microedma is a monotypic moth genus of the family Noctuidae. Its only species, Microedma extorris, is found in New Guinea and Australia. Both the genus and species were first described by Warren in 1913.
