= Haplopseustis =

Scientific classification
- Kingdom: Animalia
- Phylum: Arthropoda
- Clade: Pancrustacea
- Class: Insecta
- Order: Lepidoptera
- Superfamily: Noctuoidea
- Family: Noctuidae
- Subfamily: Acontiinae
- Genus: Haplopseustis; Meyrick, 1902
- Species: H. erythrias

Binomial name
- Haplopseustis erythrias Meyrick, 1902

Synonyms
- Generic: Acnissa Turner, 1902; Specific: Acnissa pyrrhias Turner, 1902

Genus of moths

Haplopseustis is a monotypic moth genus of the family Noctuidae. Its only species, Haplopseustis erythrias, is found in Australia where it has been found in the Northern Territory and Queensland. Both the genus and species were first described by Edward Meyrick in 1902.
