= Ctenoplusia chillagoes =

Scientific classification
- Domain: Eukaryota
- Kingdom: Animalia
- Phylum: Arthropoda
- Class: Insecta
- Order: Lepidoptera
- Superfamily: Noctuoidea
- Family: Noctuidae
- Genus: Ctenoplusia
- Species: C. chillagoes

Binomial name
- Ctenoplusia chillagoes (T.P. Lucas, 1900)

Synonyms
- Plusia chillagoes T.P. Lucas, 1900

Species of moth

Ctenoplusia chillagoes is a moth of the family Noctuidae. It is found in Queensland.

Some authors consider it to be a subspecies of Ctenoplusia placida.
