= Tabomeeres =

Scientific classification
- Domain: Eukaryota
- Kingdom: Animalia
- Phylum: Arthropoda
- Class: Insecta
- Order: Lepidoptera
- Superfamily: Noctuoidea
- Family: Noctuidae
- Subfamily: Acontiinae
- Genus: Tabomeeres; Nye, 1975
- Species: T. dolera

Binomial name
- Tabomeeres dolera (Turner, 1939)

Synonyms
- Generic: Eremobates Turner, 1939; Specific: Eremobates dolera Turner, 1939

Genus of moths

Tabomeeres is a monotypic moth genus of the family Noctuidae described by Nye in 1975. Its only species, Tabomeeres dolera, was first described by Turner in 1939. It is found in Australia.
