= Diplothecta =

Scientific classification
- Domain: Eukaryota
- Kingdom: Animalia
- Phylum: Arthropoda
- Class: Insecta
- Order: Lepidoptera
- Superfamily: Noctuoidea
- Family: Noctuidae
- Subfamily: Acontiinae
- Genus: Diplothecta; Turner, 1920
- Species: D. loxomita

Binomial name
- Diplothecta loxomita Turner, 1908

Synonyms
- Corgatha loxomita; Diplothecta digonia

Genus of moths

Diplothecta is a monotypic moth genus of the family Noctuidae. Its only species, Diplothecta loxomita, occurs in Queensland, Australia. Both the genus and species were first described by Alfred Jefferis Turner, the genus in 1920 and the species 12 years earlier in 1908.
