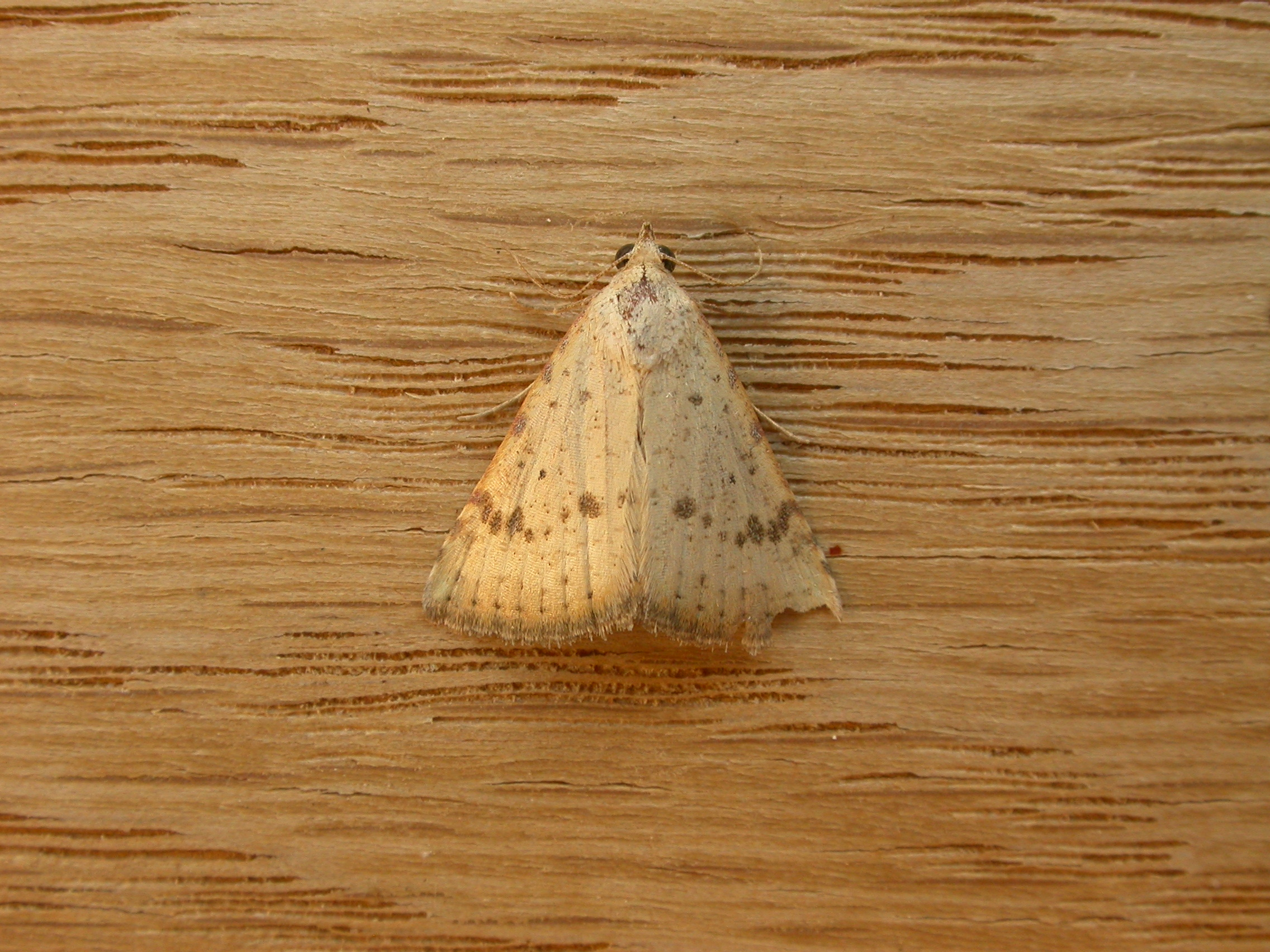

Scientific classification
- Kingdom: Animalia
- Phylum: Arthropoda
- Class: Insecta
- Order: Lepidoptera
- Family: Noctuidae
- Genus: Madope
- Species: M. auferens

Binomial name
- Madope auferens T. P. Lucas, 1898

Synonyms
- Antarchaea punctilinea Hampson, 1926

= Madope auferens =

Species of moth

Madope auferens, the black-dot moth, is a moth of the family Noctuidae first described by Thomas Pennington Lucas in 1898. It is known from Australia, including Queensland.
