= Technemon =

Scientific classification
- Domain: Eukaryota
- Kingdom: Animalia
- Phylum: Arthropoda
- Class: Insecta
- Order: Lepidoptera
- Superfamily: Noctuoidea
- Family: Noctuidae
- Subfamily: Acontiinae
- Genus: Technemon; Turner, 1945
- Species: T. epichares

Binomial name
- Technemon epichares Turner, 1945

Genus of moths

Technemon is a monotypic moth genus of the family Noctuidae. Its only species, Technemon epichares, is found in the Australian state of Queensland. Both the genus and species were first described by Turner in 1945.
