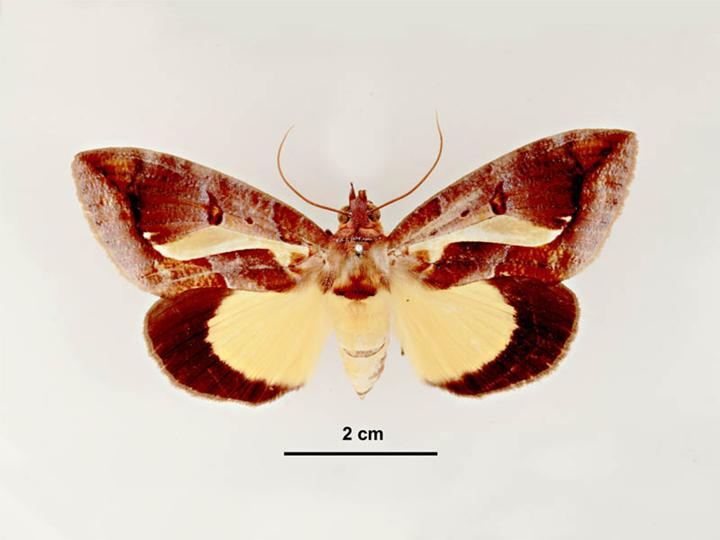
- Female
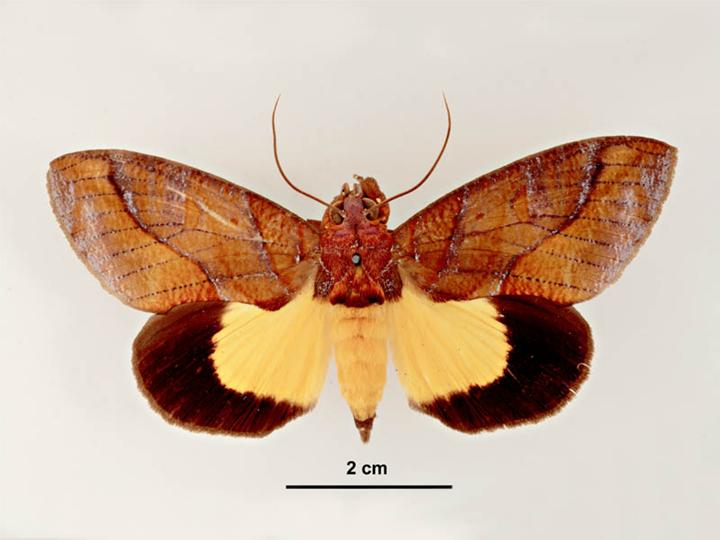
- Male

Scientific classification
- Domain: Eukaryota
- Kingdom: Animalia
- Phylum: Arthropoda
- Class: Insecta
- Order: Lepidoptera
- Superfamily: Noctuoidea
- Family: Erebidae
- Genus: Eudocima
- Species: E. iridescens

Binomial name
- Eudocima iridescens (T.P Lucas, 1894)

Synonyms
- Ophideres iridescens Lucas, 1894; Ophideres pyrocrana Turner, 1908

= Eudocima iridescens =

Species of moth

Eudocima iridescens is a moth of the family Erebidae. It is found in large parts of the world, including Australia, New Zealand and Papua New Guinea.

The wingspan is about 90 mm.

The larvae feed on Menispermaceae species, including Pycnarrhena novoguineensis. It is considered a pest on citrus and other fruit, which it damages by piercing the fruit with its proboscis in order to suck the juice.
