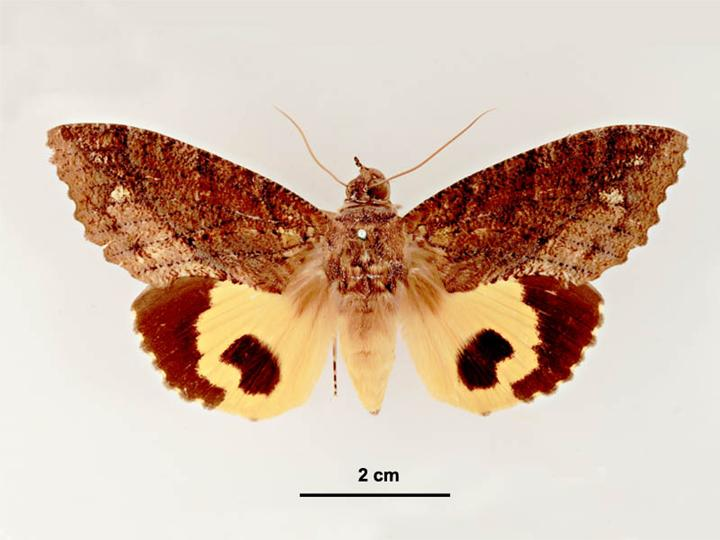
- Female
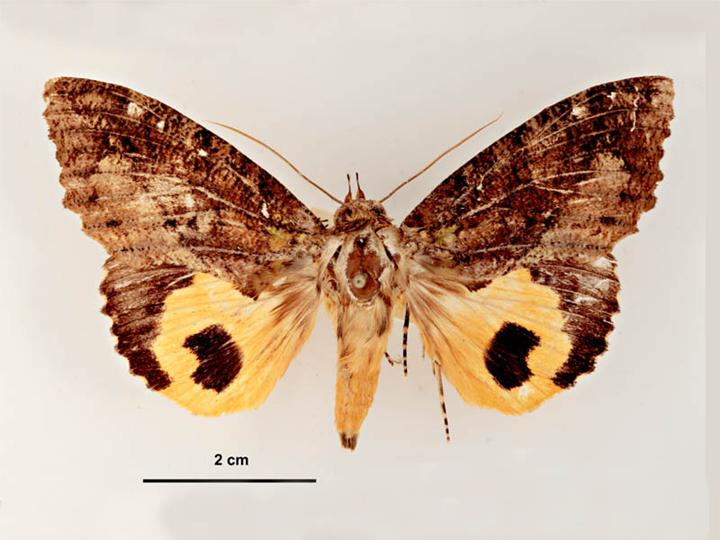
- Male

Scientific classification
- Domain: Eukaryota
- Kingdom: Animalia
- Phylum: Arthropoda
- Class: Insecta
- Order: Lepidoptera
- Superfamily: Noctuoidea
- Family: Erebidae
- Genus: Eudocima
- Species: E. jordani

Binomial name
- Eudocima jordani (Holland, 1900)

Synonyms
- Ophideres jordani Holland, 1900

= Eudocima jordani =

Jordan's fruit piercing moth

Species of moth

Eudocima jordani, the Jordan's fruit piercing moth, is a moth of the family Erebidae. It is found on New Guinea and Queensland, Australia. Adults are considered a commercial pest. They damage fruit by piercing the skin to suck juice.

The wingspan is about 70 mm.

The larvae feed on Tinospora smilacina.
