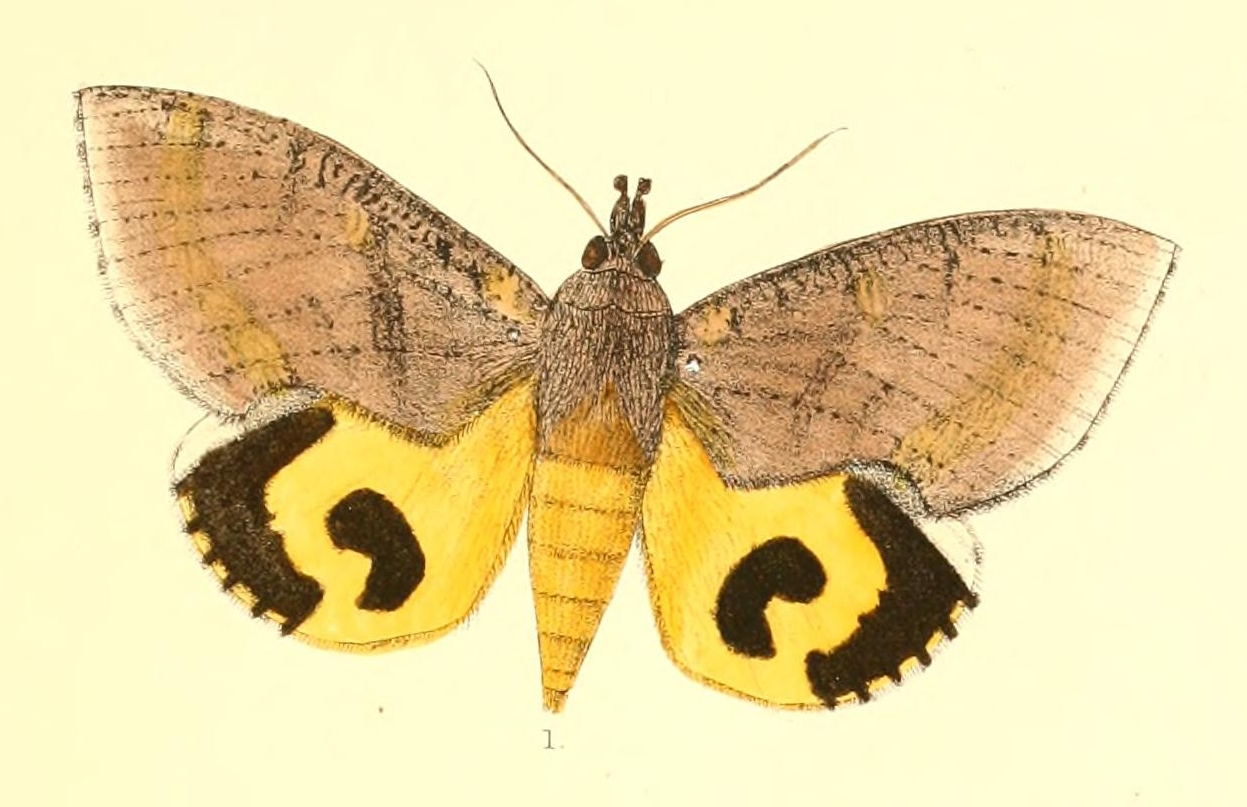

Scientific classification
- Kingdom: Animalia
- Phylum: Arthropoda
- Class: Insecta
- Order: Lepidoptera
- Superfamily: Noctuoidea
- Family: Erebidae
- Genus: Eudocima
- Species: E. discrepans

Binomial name
- Eudocima discrepans (Walker, 1858)

Synonyms
- Ophideres discrepans Walker, 1858; Ophideres archon C. and R. Felder, 1874

= Eudocima discrepans =

Species of moth

Eudocima discrepans is a moth of the family Erebidae first described by Francis Walker in 1858. It is found in the north-eastern part of the Himalayas, western China, Singapore, Thailand and Sundaland.

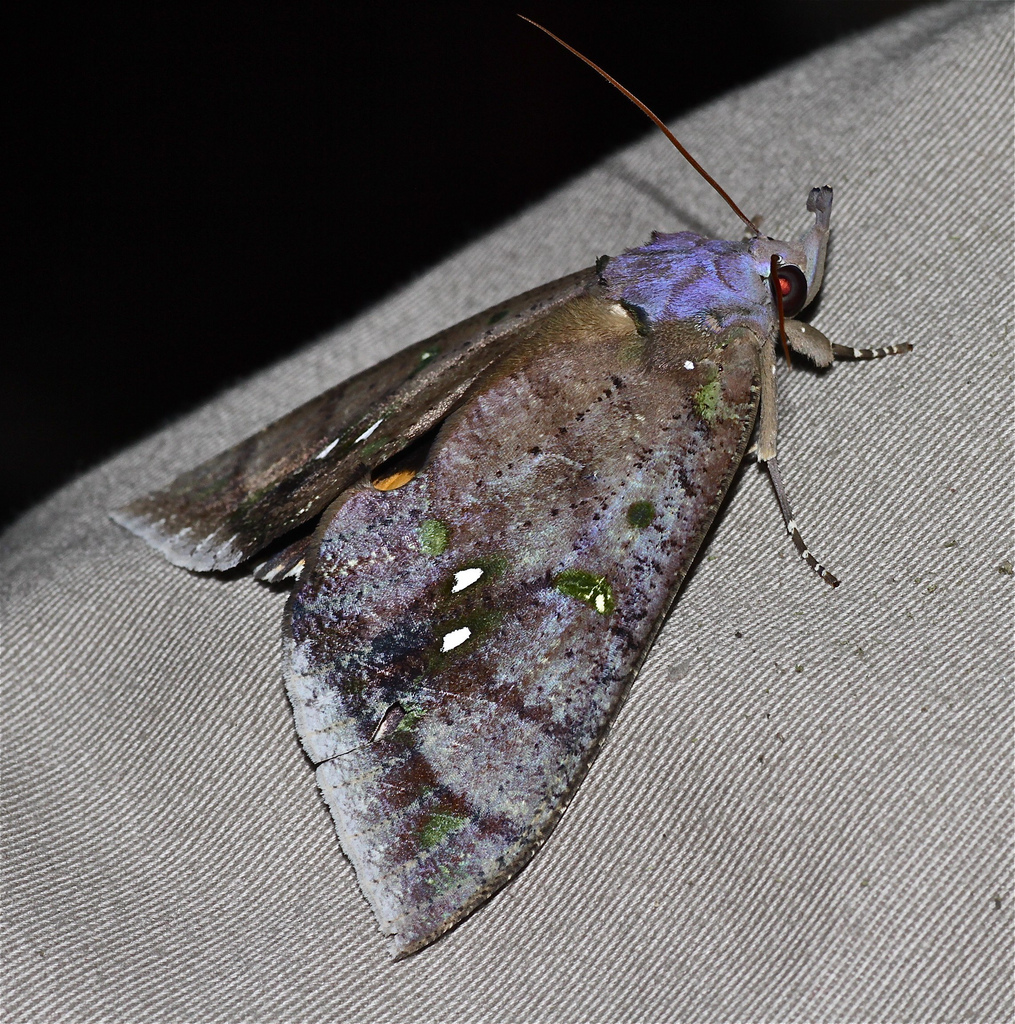

The larvae feed on Tinomiscium petiolare.
