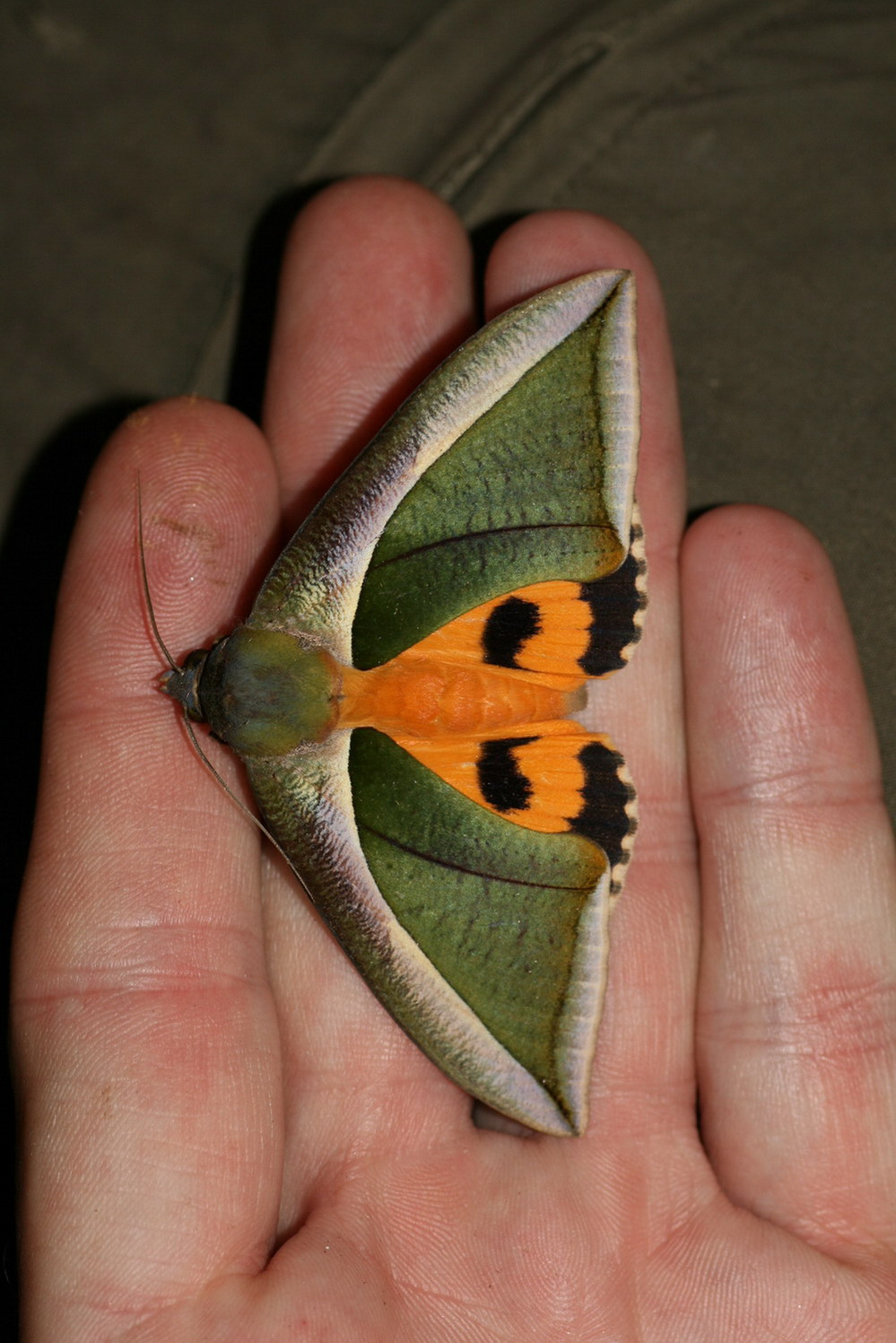

Scientific classification
- Domain: Eukaryota
- Kingdom: Animalia
- Phylum: Arthropoda
- Class: Insecta
- Order: Lepidoptera
- Superfamily: Noctuoidea
- Family: Erebidae
- Genus: Eudocima
- Species: E. salaminia

Binomial name
- Eudocima salaminia (Cramer, 1777)

Synonyms
- Phalaena salaminia Cramer, 1777; Ophideres atkinsoni Scott, 1890

= Eudocima salaminia =

Green fruit-piercing moth

Species of moth

Eudocima salaminia, the green fruit-piercing moth, is a moth of the family Erebidae. The species was first described by Pieter Cramer in 1777. It is found from India, and across south-east Asia to the Pacific Islands. In Australia it occurs in the Northern Territory, Queensland and New South Wales. The adult is a fruit piercer.

== Description ==
The wingspan is about 80–104 mm. Palpi with second joint very short and non-spatulate. Forewings with straight outer margin. Cilia non-crenulate. Head and collar plum fruit colored. Thorax greenish with tufts on metathorax. Abdomen orange. Forewings are golden greenish. A broad cream-colored costal fascia runs from near base of inner margin to apex, striated with pale red and turning to green at costa. There is a creamy marginal band as well. A curved red streak found below vein 2. Hindwings orange with large black lunule beyond lower angle of cell. A black marginal band with cilia whitish spots runs from costa to vein 2. Ventral side of forewings fuscous, with orange at base. Broad whitish postmedial band not reaching costa or inner margin. Cilia whitish.

Larva dark purplish grey with a few whitish specks. Somites 4th to 6th with small yellowish sub-dorsal spots, beneath which on 5th and 6th somites is a red-ringed black ocellus with whitish pupil. 11th somite is with a conical reddish dorsal tubercle. Late instar is olive brown with dark specks. A pale lateral fascia found on medial somites and purplish fascia from tubercle to last abdominal segment.

== Gallery ==
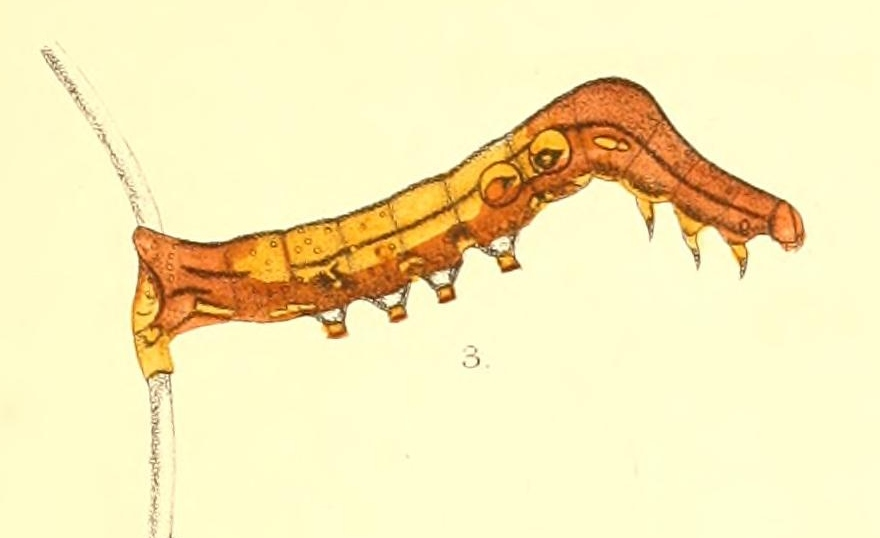
Caterpillar

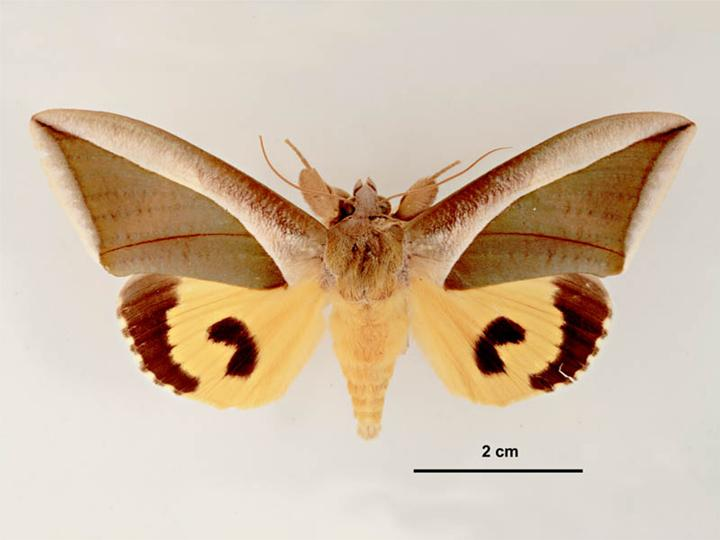
Female, dorsal view

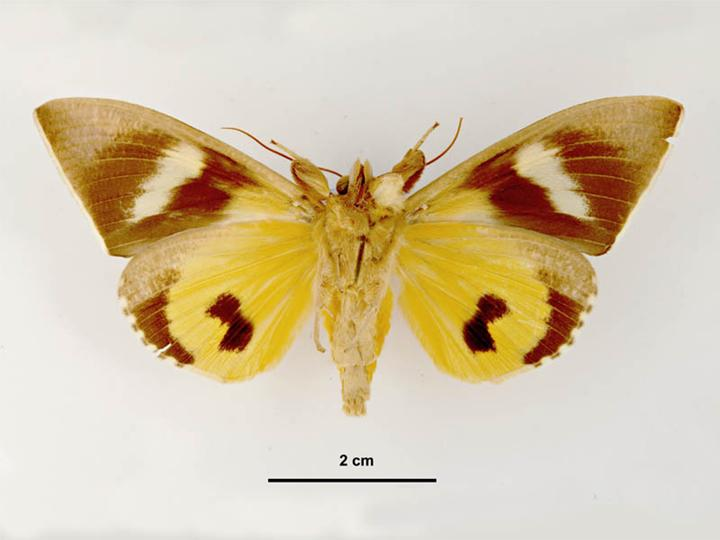
Female, ventral view

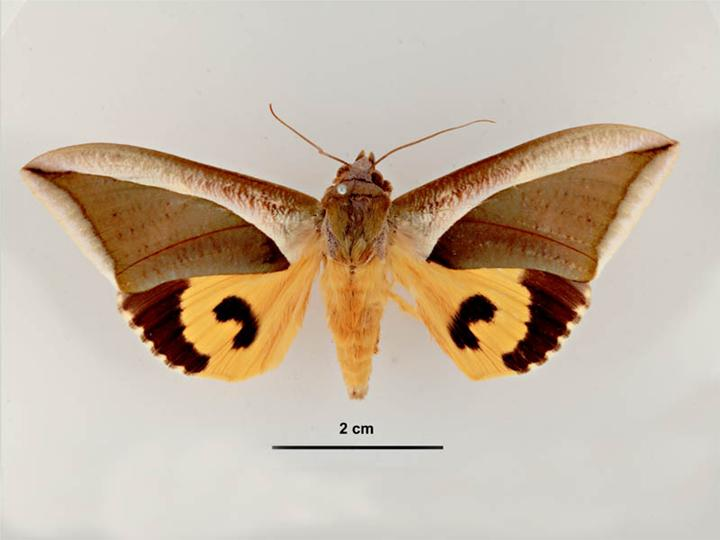
Male, dorsal view

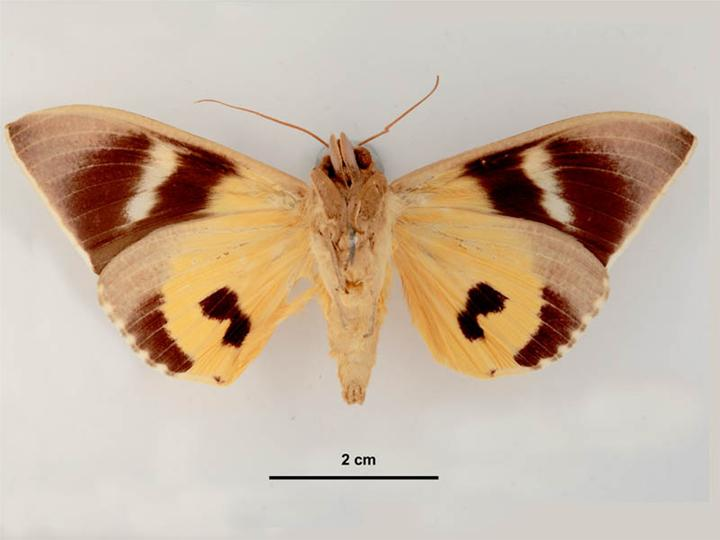
Male, ventral view
