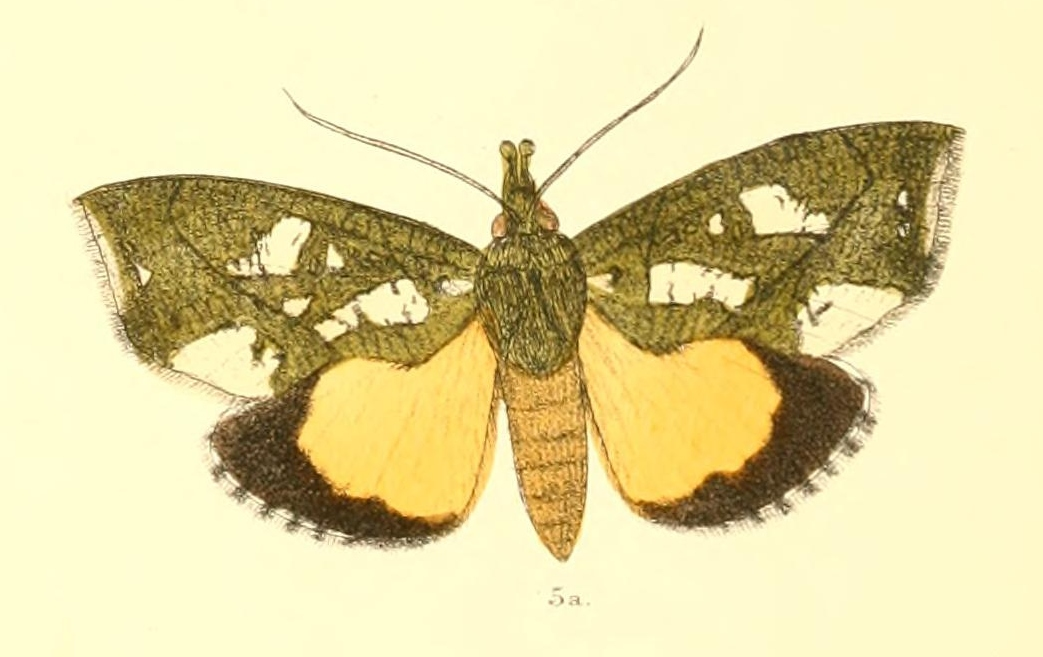

Scientific classification
- Domain: Eukaryota
- Kingdom: Animalia
- Phylum: Arthropoda
- Class: Insecta
- Order: Lepidoptera
- Superfamily: Noctuoidea
- Family: Erebidae
- Genus: Eudocima
- Species: E. cocalus

Binomial name
- Eudocima cocalus (Cramer, 1777)

Synonyms
- Phalaena cocalus Cramer, 1777; Noctua maculata Weber, 1801; Ophideres plana Walker, 1858; Rhytia crepidolata Lucas, 1894

= Eudocima cocalus =

Cocalus fruit piercing moth

Species of moth

Eudocima cocalus, the cocalus fruit piercing moth, is a moth of the family Erebidae. It is found in the north-eastern part of the Himalaya, to Sundaland and east to Queensland, Australia and the Solomons.

The wingspan is about 100 mm.

The larvae feed on Cocculus species. The adults are a pest in lychee and carambola orchards. They pierce the fruit in order to suck the juice.

== Gallery ==
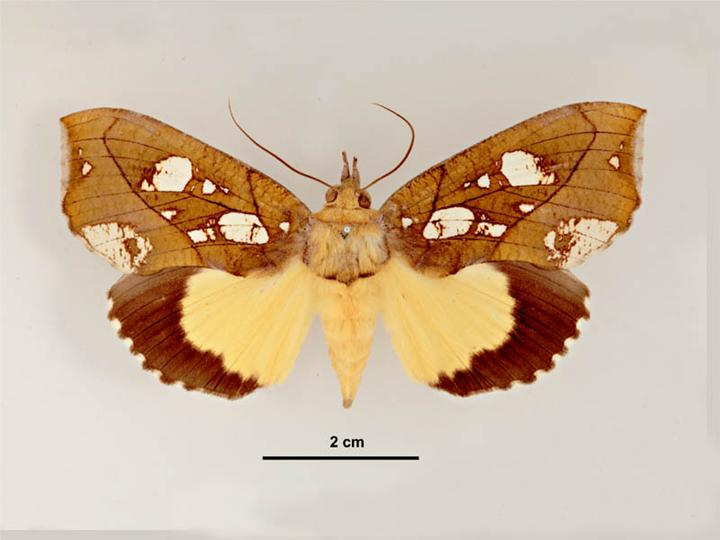
Female, dorsal view

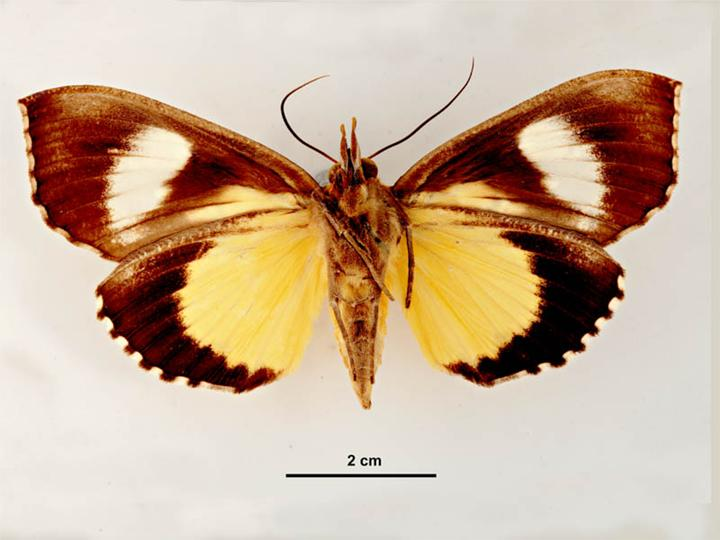
Female, ventral view

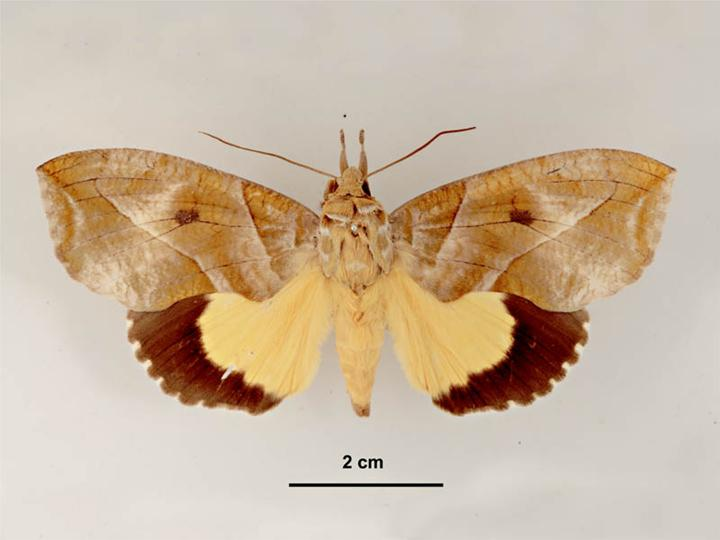
Male, dorsal view

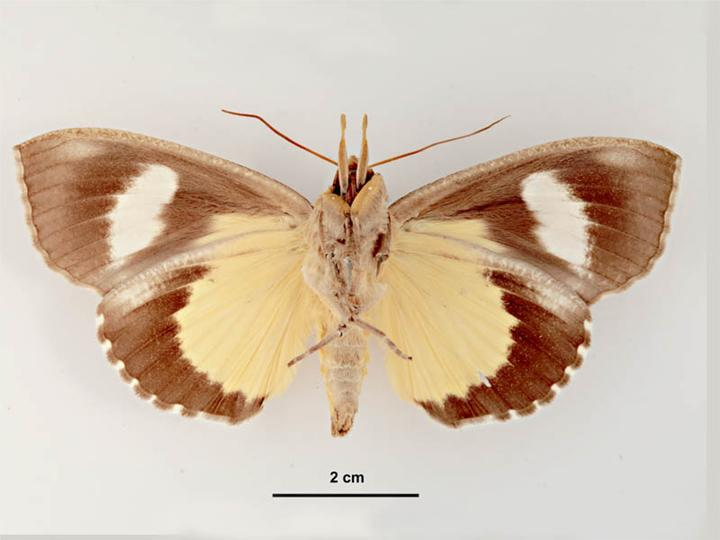
Male, ventral view

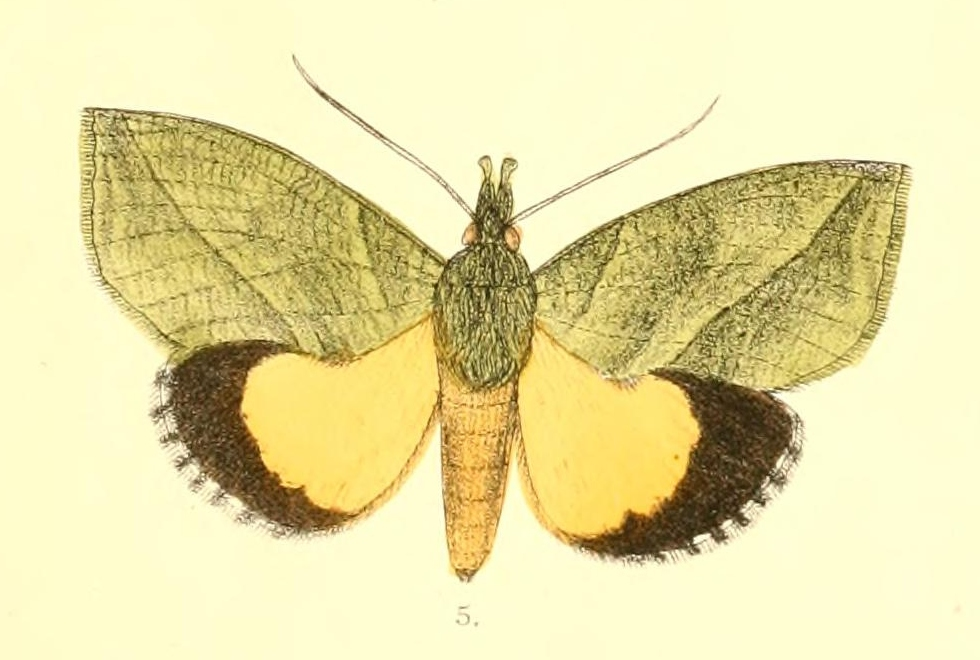
Illustration mounted adult

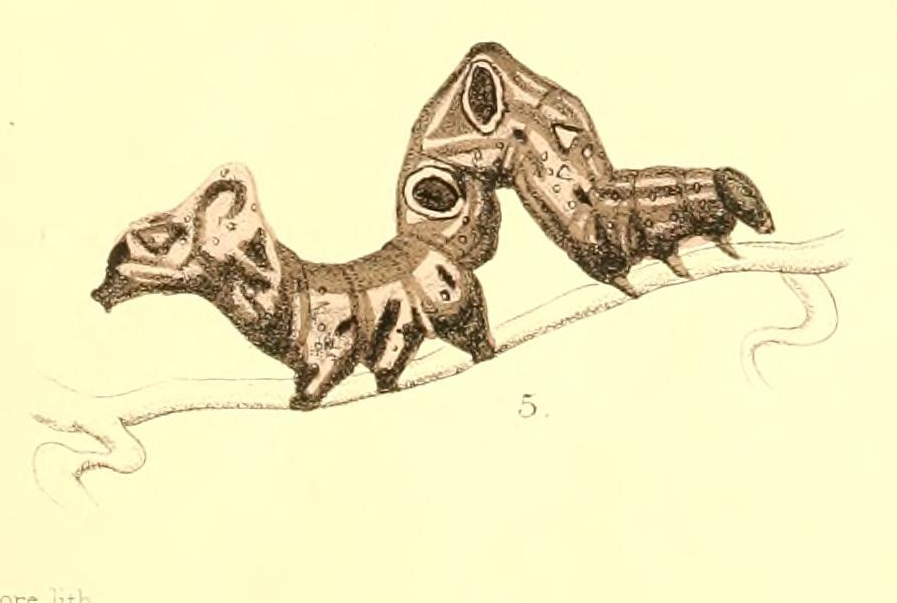
Illustration Caterpillar
