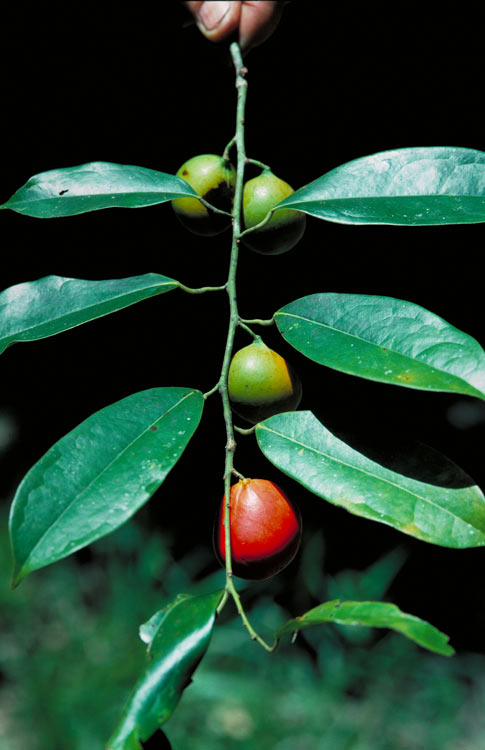
- Branch with fruit

Conservation status
- Least Concern (NCA)

Scientific classification
- Kingdom: Plantae
- Clade: Embryophytes
- Clade: Tracheophytes
- Clade: Spermatophytes
- Clade: Angiosperms
- Clade: Eudicots
- Order: Ranunculales
- Family: Menispermaceae
- Genus: Pycnarrhena
- Species: P. ozantha

Binomial name
- Pycnarrhena ozantha Diels
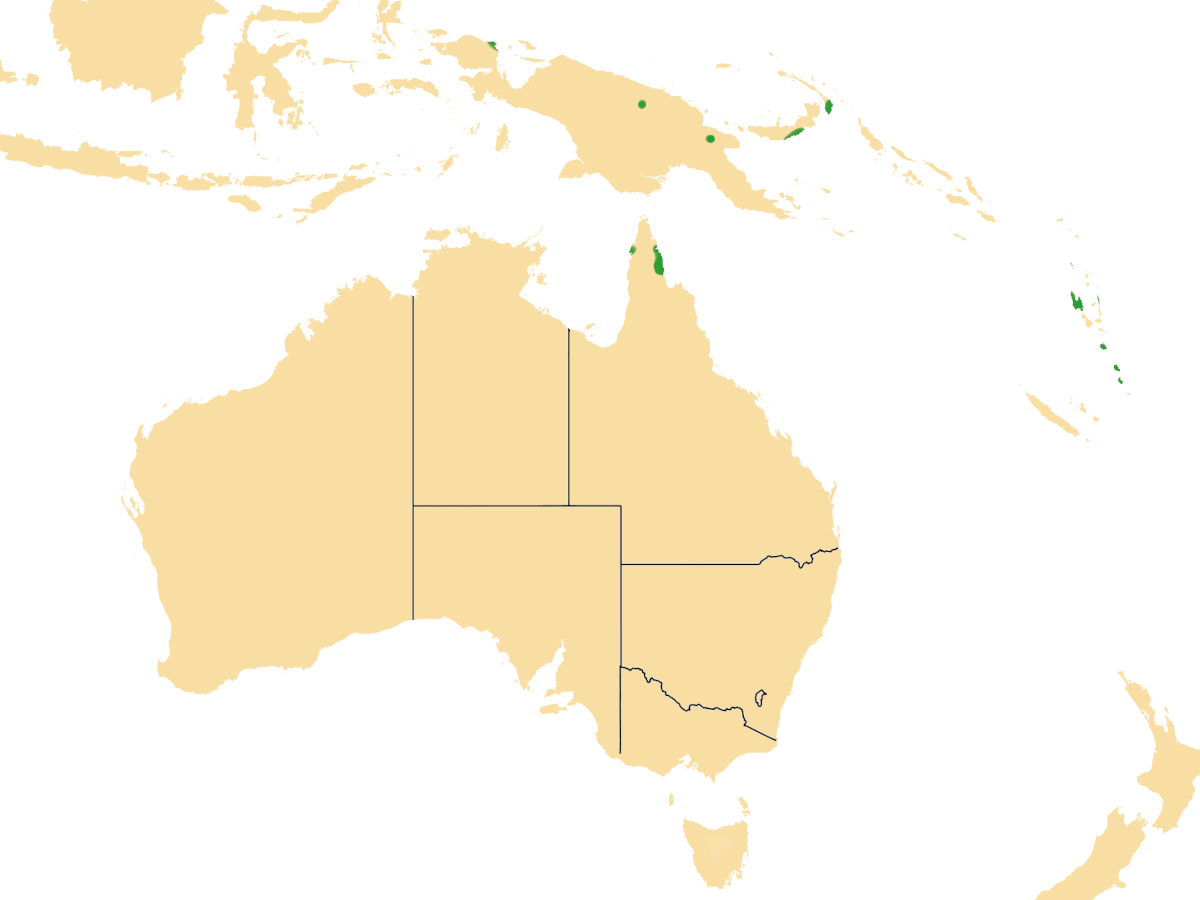

Synonyms
- Pycnarrhena papuana Kaneh. & Hatus.

= Pycnarrhena ozantha =

Species of flowering plant

Pycnarrhena ozantha is a species of plant in the family Menispermaceae. It is native to New Guinea, Vanuatu and Cape York Peninsula in Queensland, Australia.

== Description ==
Pycnarrhena ozantha is a woody climber with a stem diameter up to 8 cm (3.1 in). It is a twining vine, growing around other objects such as tree trunks and branches for support. Leaves are simple (i.e. without divisions or lobes), and they are arranged alternately on the branches. They measure up to 22 cm (8.7 in) long and are attached to the twigs by a petiole (leaf stalk) about 2 cm (0.79 in) long.

Flowers are produced in clusters in the leaf axils or on the woody stems. They have between five and ten sepals but no petals. This species is dioecious, meaning that pistillate (functionally female) and staminate (functionally male) flowers are borne on separate plants.

The fruit is a hairless orange-red drupe about 30 mm (1.2 in) long which contains a single seed.

=== Phenology ===
In Australia, fruit appear in October and November.

== Distribution and habitat ==
The native range of this species is New Guinea, the Bismarck Archipelago, Vanuatu and the northern half of Cape York Peninsula. It grows in dryer rainforest types such as gallery forest and monsoon forest, at altitudes up to about 100 m (330 ft).

== Taxonomy ==
Pycnarrhena ozantha was first described in 1915 by German botanist Ludwig Diels, based on collections of plant material from the Sepik district of northeastern Papua New Guinea. Diels ended his description lamenting that knowledge of the species of Pycnarrhena is minimal due to a lack of collected material, particularly flowers of both sexes.

=== Etymology ===
The name Pycnarrhena is created from the words pycno-, 'dense' or 'thick', and arrhen, 'male'. It refers to the dense clusters of male flowers. The species epithet ozantha combines the Ancient Greek words ózō, 'to smell', with ánthos, 'flower'.

== Conservation ==
This species is listed as least concern under the Queensland Government's Nature Conservation Act. As of 9 April 2026, it has not been assessed by the International Union for Conservation of Nature (IUCN).

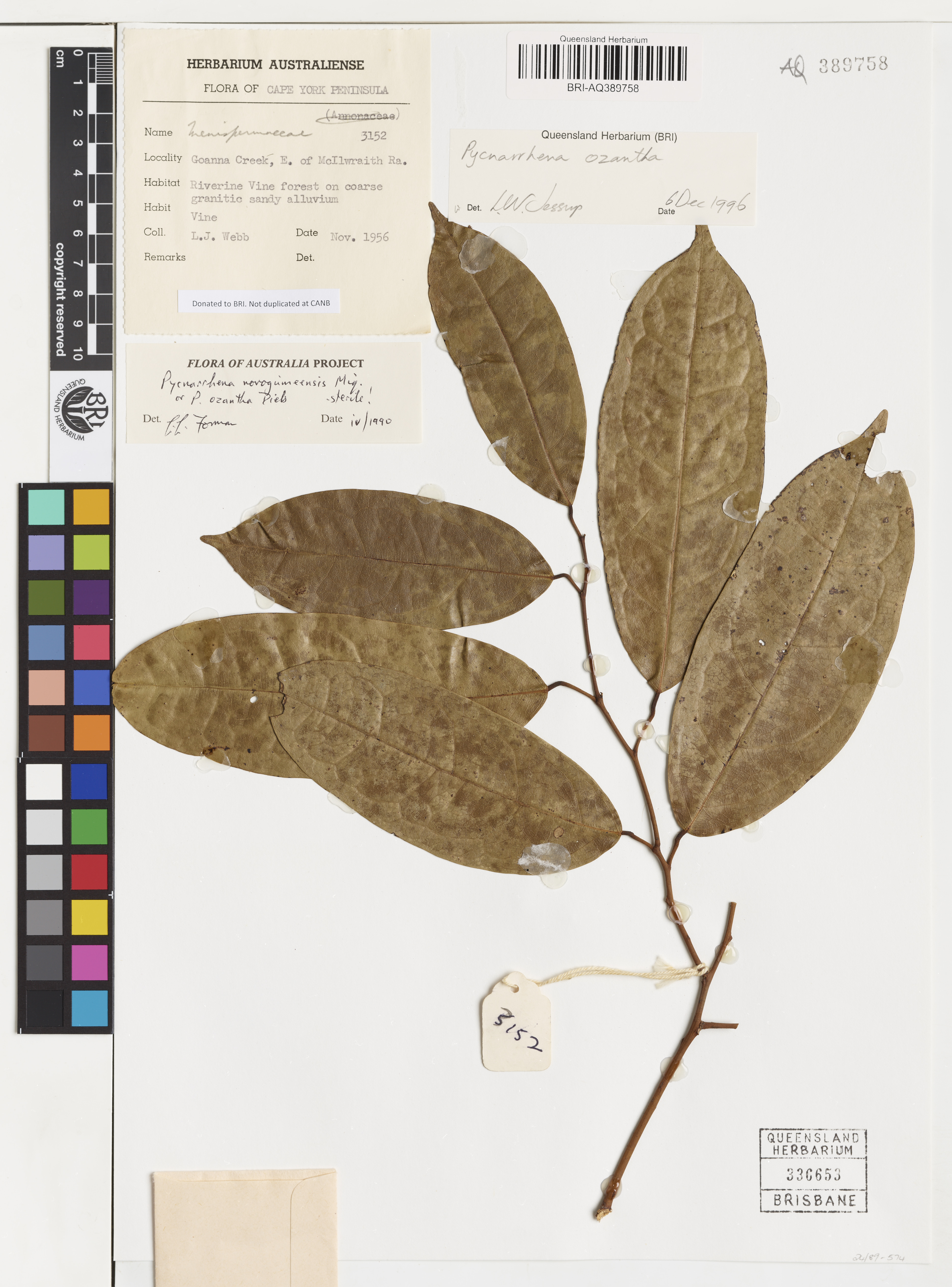
Herbarium speminen

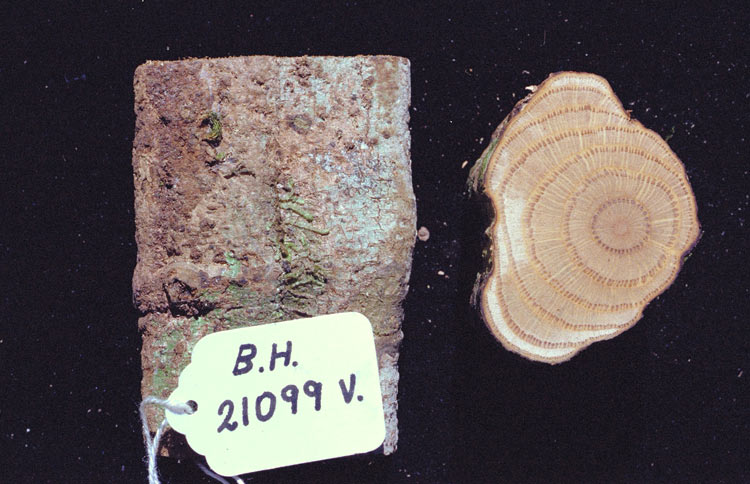
Vine stem cross section

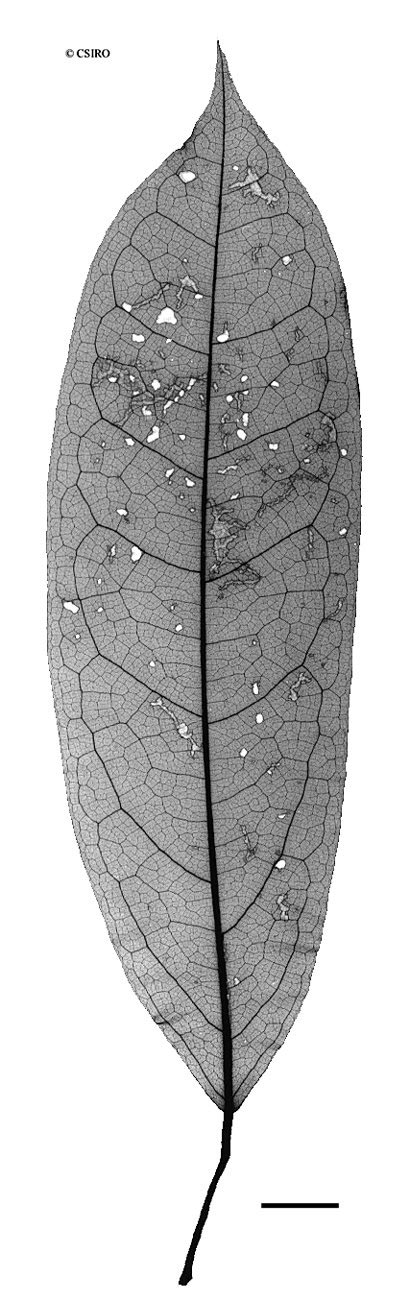
X-ray of leaf
