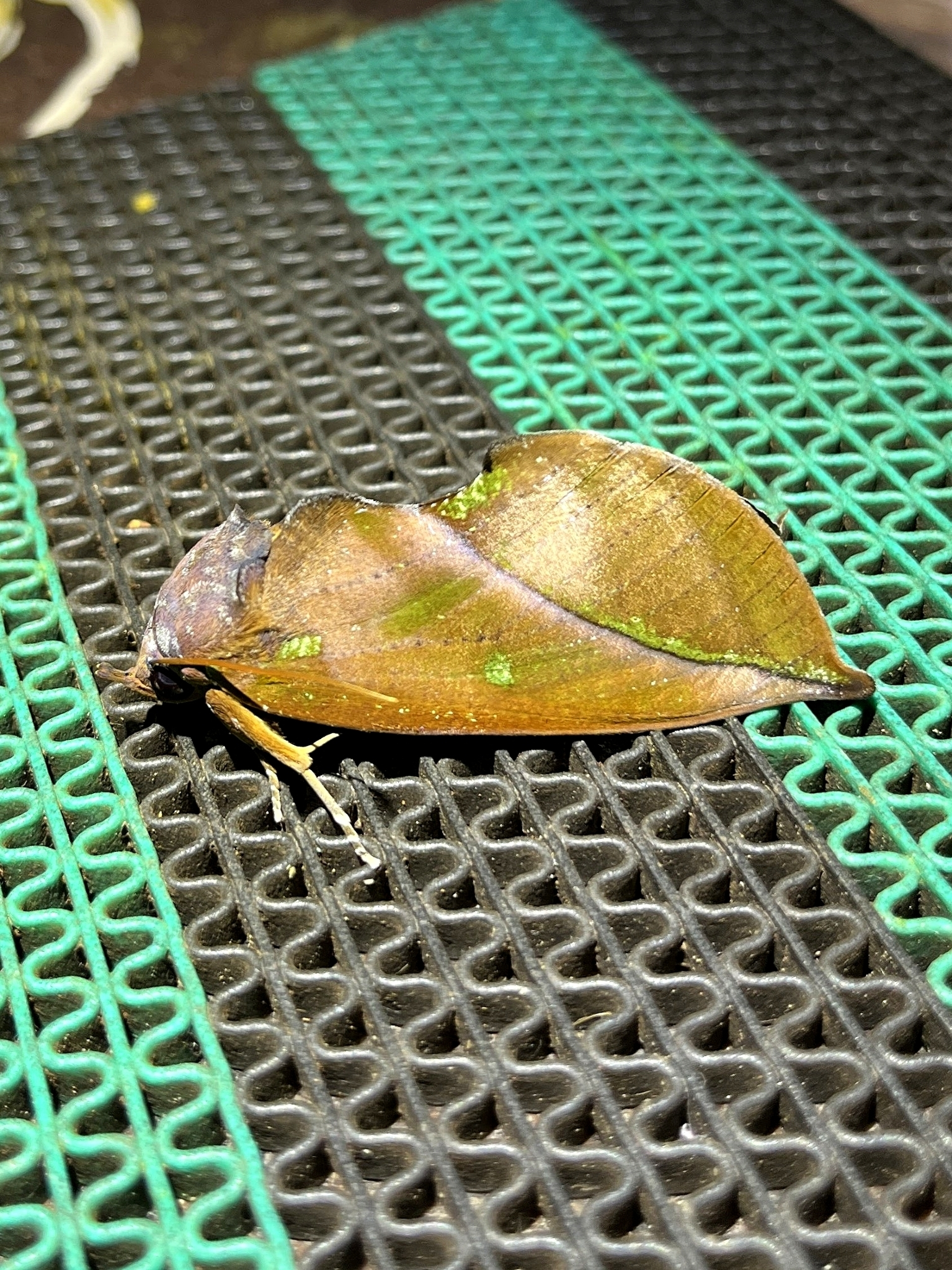

Scientific classification
- Domain: Eukaryota
- Kingdom: Animalia
- Phylum: Arthropoda
- Class: Insecta
- Order: Lepidoptera
- Superfamily: Noctuoidea
- Family: Erebidae
- Genus: Eudocima
- Species: E. aurantia

Binomial name
- Eudocima aurantia (Moore, 1877)

Synonyms
- Ophideres aurantia Moore, 1877; Adris rutilus Moore, 1881; Khadira aurantia Moore; Holloway, 1976

= Eudocima aurantia =

Species of moth

Eudocima aurantia, the fruit-sucking moth, is a moth of the family Erebidae. The species was first described by the British entomologist Frederic Moore in 1877. It is found across south-east Asia, from Sri-Lanka to northern Queensland, Australia. It is also present on the Andamans.

== Description ==
The wingspan is about 90–120 mm. Palpi with third joint long and spatulate at extremity. Forewings with produced apex to a rounded lobe. Head and thorax ferrous colored, with plum-color suffusion. Abdomen orange. Forewing ferrous with dark stria and slight purple bloom. The veins speckled with blue. Reniform green and indistinct. There is a dark line runs from apex to center of inner margin, sometimes with green patches beyond it. Hindwings orange with a large black lunule beyond lower angle of cell. A submarginal patch can be seen between veins 1 and 2. Ventral side orange. Forewings with black mark below angle of cell and beyond the cell between veins 3 and 5. Hindwings with lunule and patch of upperside.

== Ecology ==
Larva has pinkish grey dorsal surface suffused darker to a V-shaped yellow band. It has black spiracles and marbled white-ringed rufous-orange ocellate marks with three ferrous lines crossing them. The larvae feed on Cocculus species. The moth resembles a leaf, which fools predators such as birds. Both adults and caterpillars are pests of various fruits. They pierce the fruit in order to suck the juice and in the case of the caterpillar eat the flesh. Fruits may show pre-mature fall due to the attack.

Parasitoids such as Telenomus lucullus and Euplectrus melanocephalus are used as controlling measures.

== Gallery ==
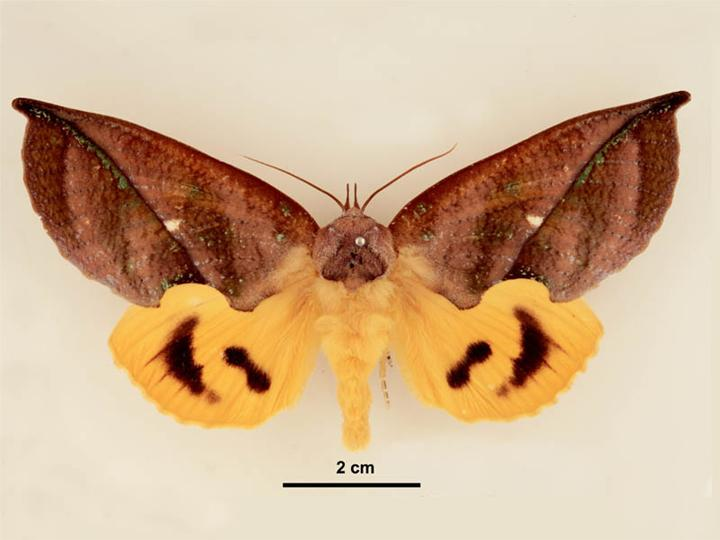
Female, dorsal view

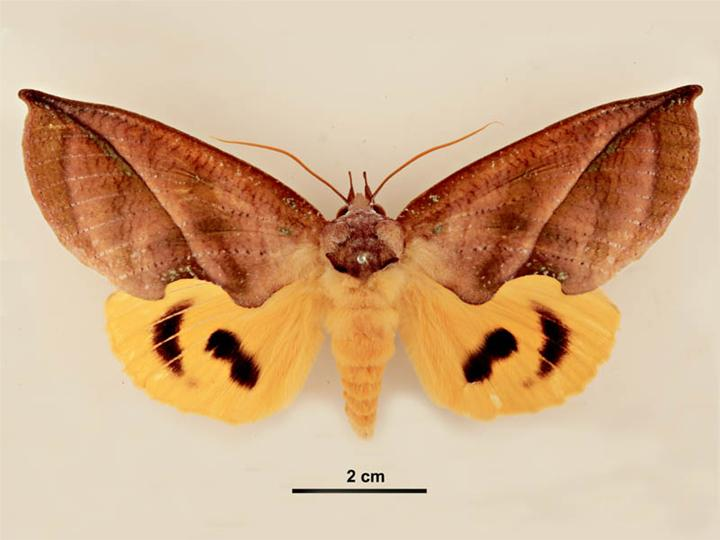
Male, dorsal view

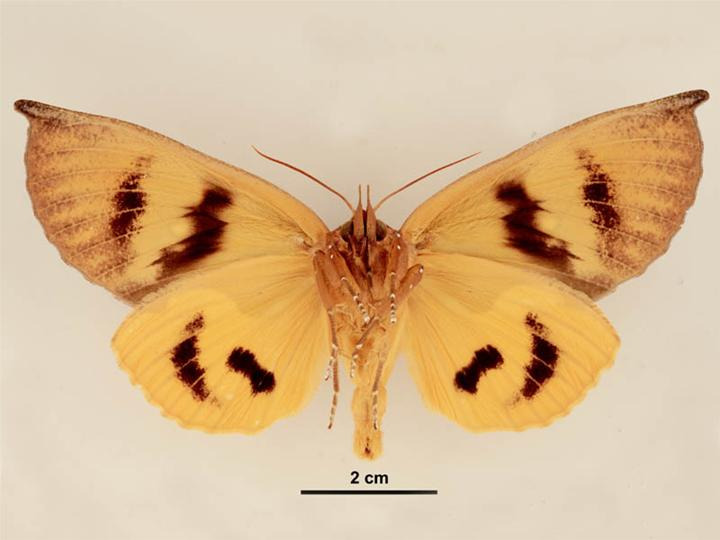
Female, ventral view

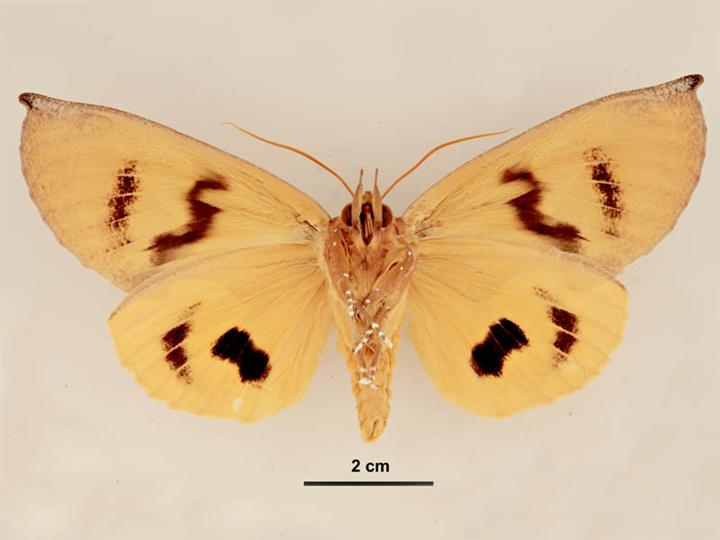
Male, ventral view

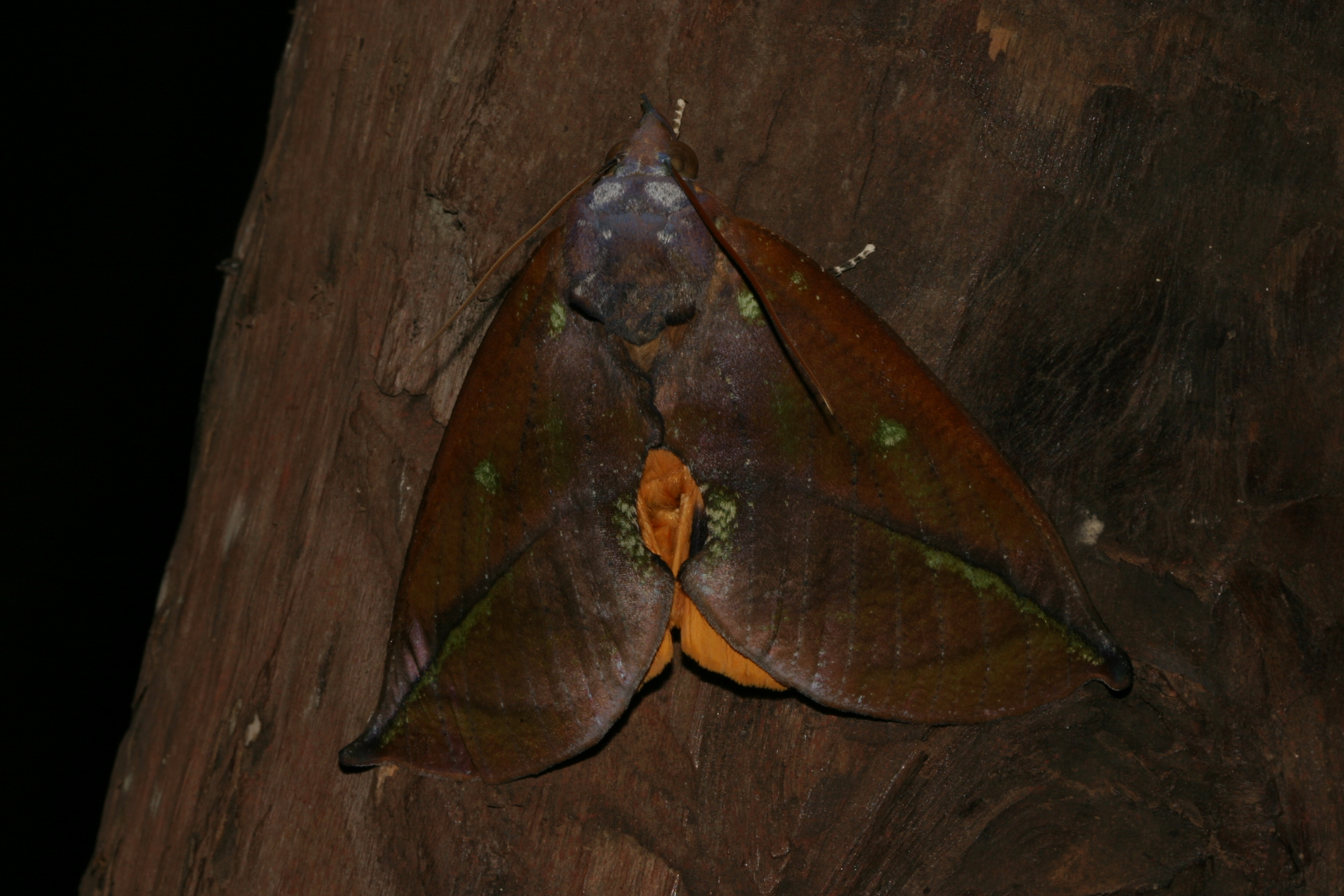
