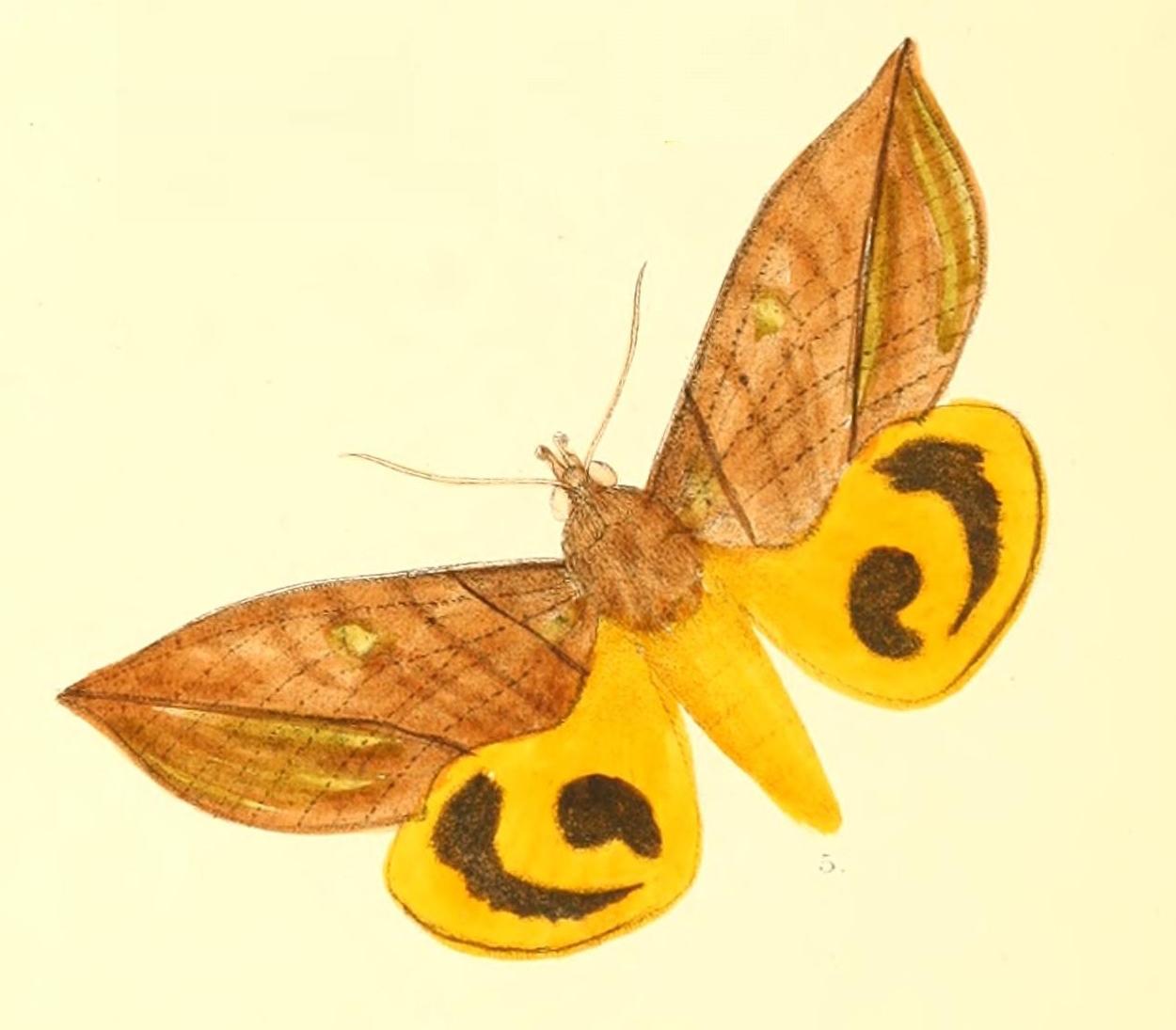

Scientific classification
- Kingdom: Animalia
- Phylum: Arthropoda
- Class: Insecta
- Order: Lepidoptera
- Superfamily: Noctuoidea
- Family: Erebidae
- Genus: Eudocima
- Species: E. tyrannus

Binomial name
- Eudocima tyrannus (Guenée, 1852)

Synonyms
- Ophideres tyrannus Guenée, 1852; Ophideres amurensis Staudinger, 1892; Adris tyrannus

= Eudocima tyrannus =

Species of moth

Eudocima tyrannus is a moth of the family Erebidae first described by Achille Guenée in 1852. It is found in south-eastern Siberia, India, eastern China, the Philippines and Japan.

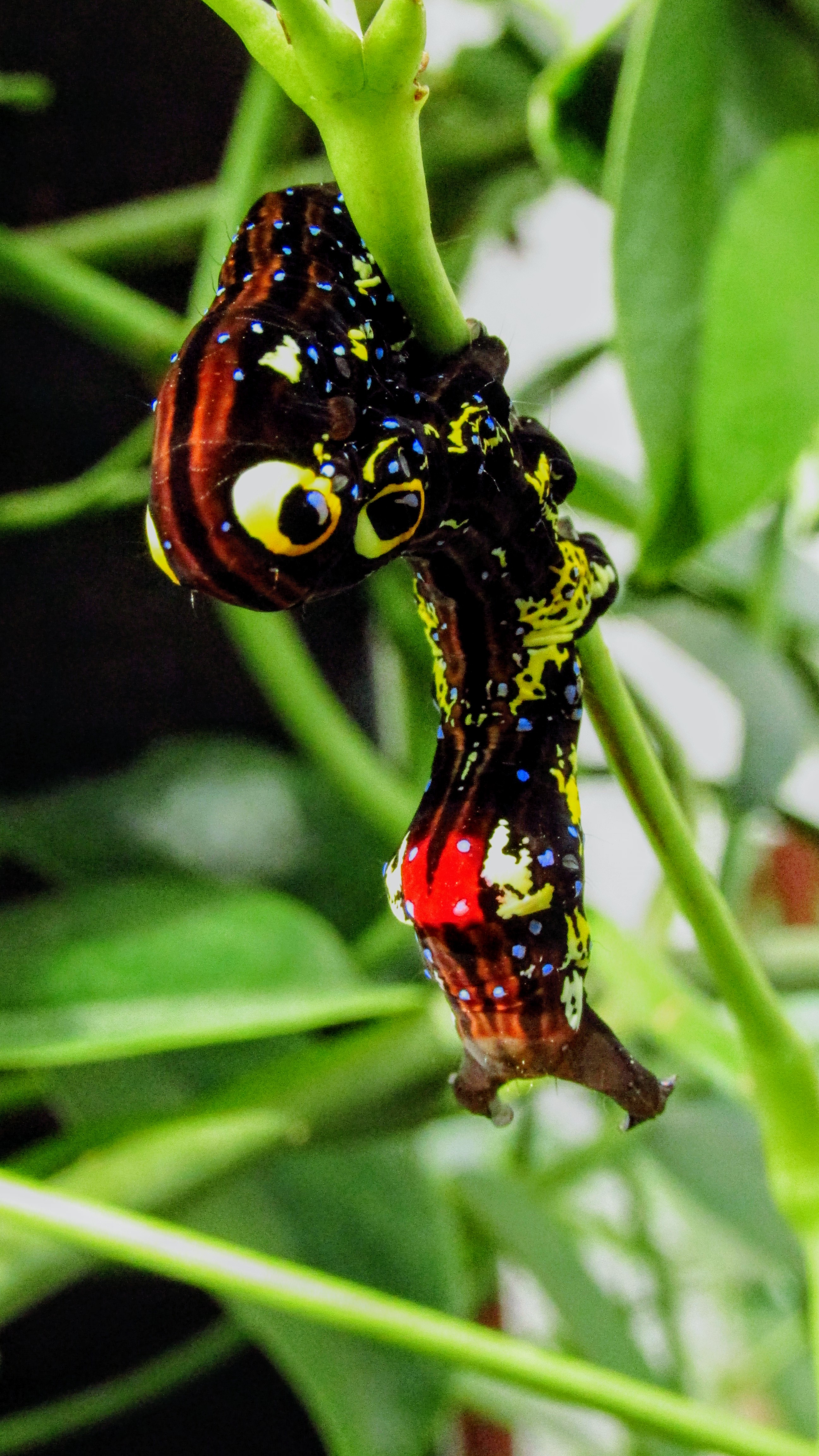
Larva in Saitama, Japan

Adult moth in Kōchi, Japan

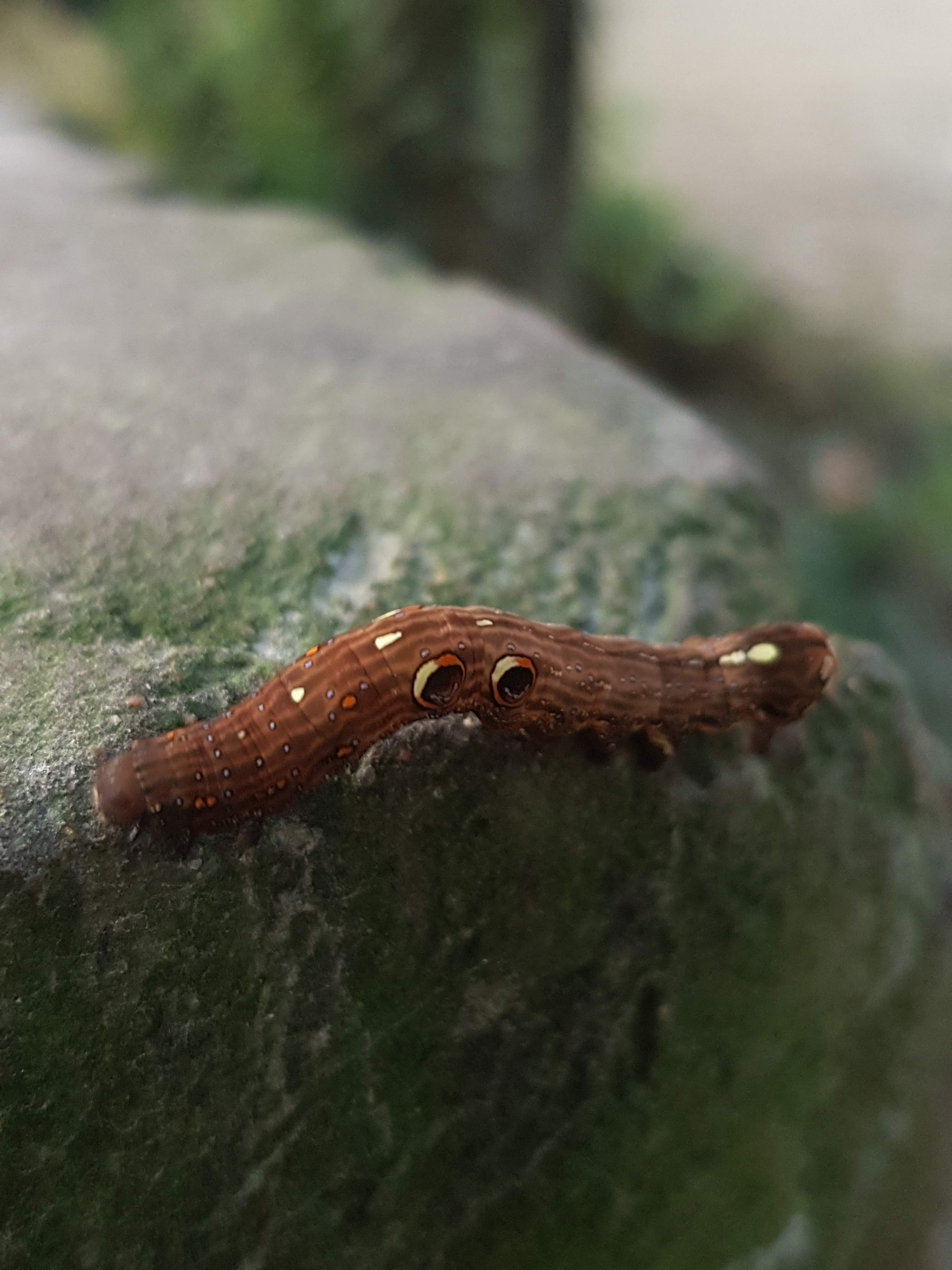
Larva in Lucknow, India

The wingspan is about 95 mm.
