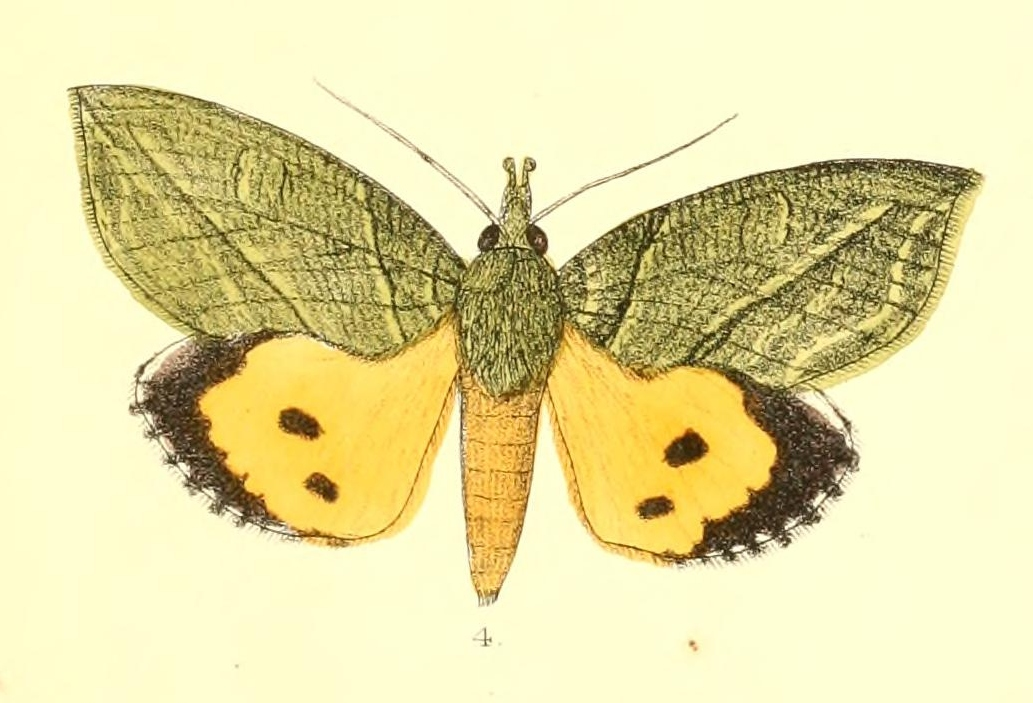
- Male

Scientific classification
- Domain: Eukaryota
- Kingdom: Animalia
- Phylum: Arthropoda
- Class: Insecta
- Order: Lepidoptera
- Superfamily: Noctuoidea
- Family: Erebidae
- Genus: Eudocima
- Species: E. hypermnestra

Binomial name
- Eudocima hypermnestra (Cramer, 1780)

Synonyms
- Phalaena hypermnestra Cramer, 1780

= Eudocima hypermnestra =

Species of moth

Eudocima hypermnestra is a moth of the family Erebidae described by Pieter Cramer in 1780. It is found in China, Thailand, Taiwan, India and Sri Lanka.

== Description ==
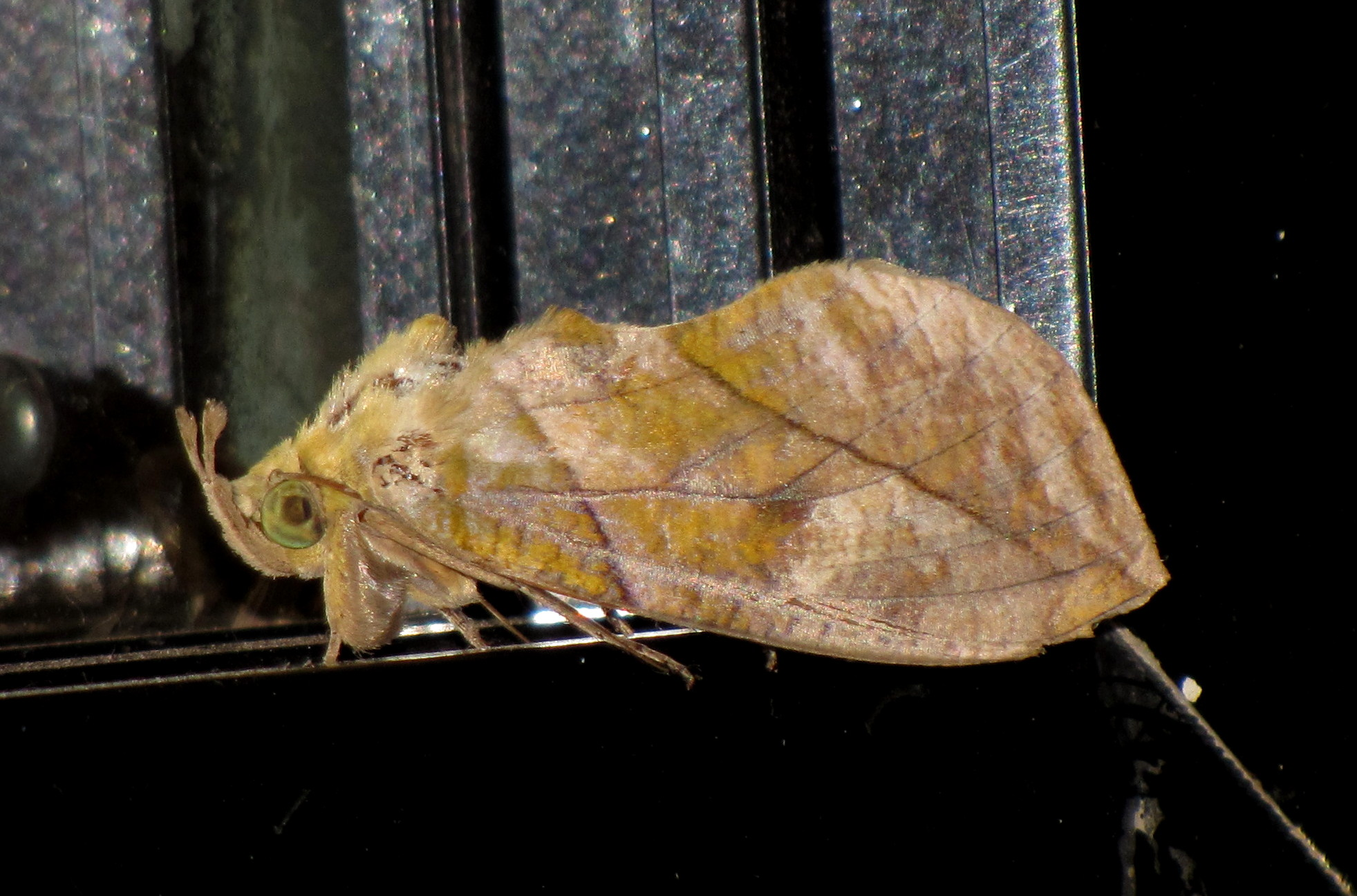

Its wingspan is about 88 mm. Palpi with third joint long and spatulate at extremity. Forewings not produced at apex. Outer margin rounded. Male has yellowish-green head and thorax. Palpi, collar and tegula marked with greyish. Abdomen orange and anal tuft brownish. Forewings with yellowish green, with dark striae. There are some grey patches on inner and outer areas. There is an oblique rufous antemedial line and a very oblique rufous line runs from costa before apex to center of inner margin and curved below the costa, where it is joined by a dark streak from the apex. Hindwings orange, with a black spot at lower angle of cell and another above anal angle. The marginal area black from apex to vein 2 and with marginal and cilial white spots, its inner edge waved. Ventral side of forewings with white postmedial band.

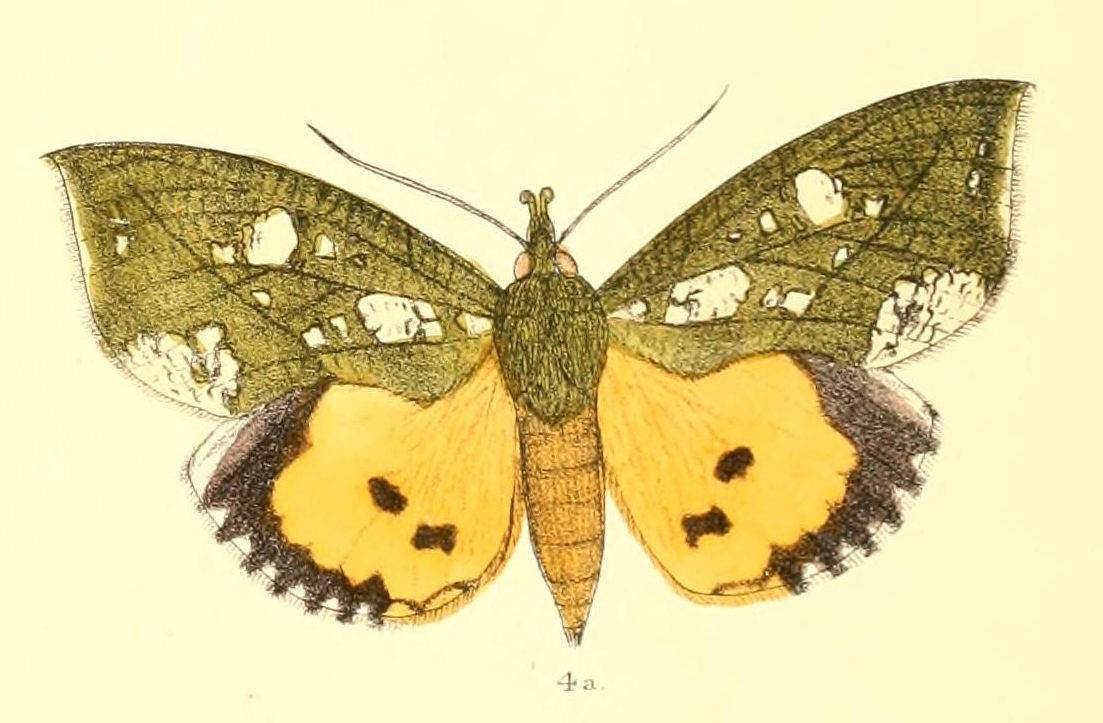
Female

Female with large and small white rufous striated patches and spots found on forewings below and beyond cell, at outer angle and below apex.

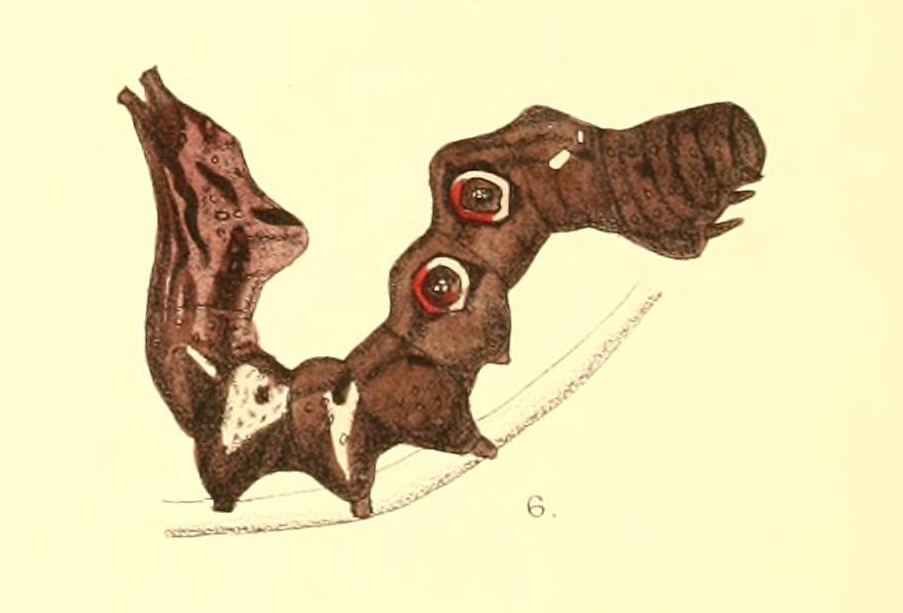
Caterpillar
