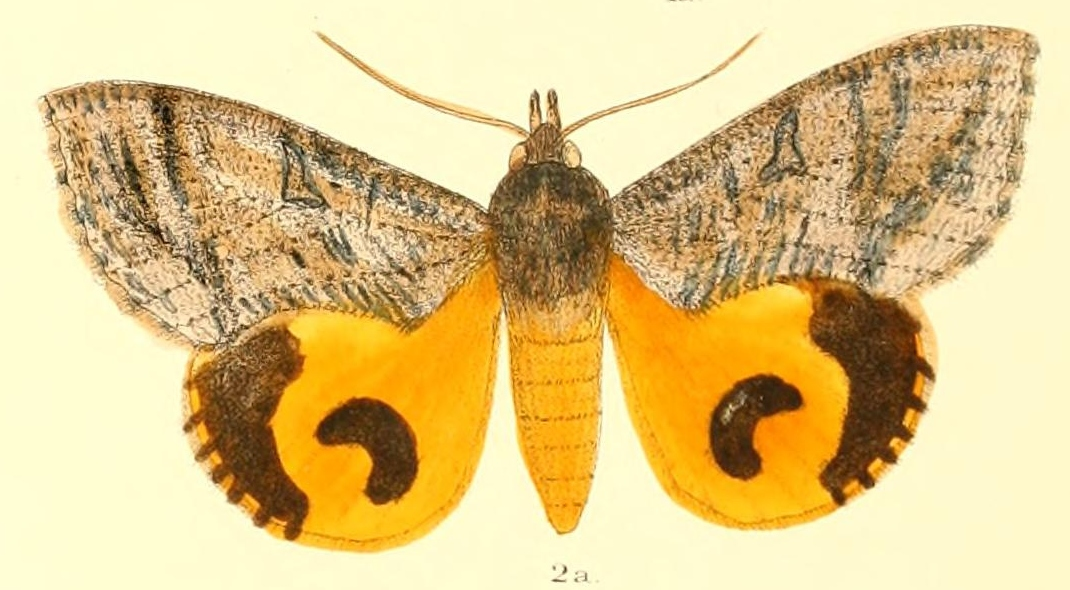

Scientific classification
- Domain: Eukaryota
- Kingdom: Animalia
- Phylum: Arthropoda
- Class: Insecta
- Order: Lepidoptera
- Superfamily: Noctuoidea
- Family: Erebidae
- Genus: Eudocima
- Species: E. cajeta

Binomial name
- Eudocima cajeta (Cramer, 1775)

Synonyms
- Phalaena cajeta Cramer, 1775; Ophideres multiscripta Walker, 1858; Othreis talboti Prout, 1922

= Eudocima cajeta =

Species of moth

Eudocima cajeta is a moth of the family Erebidae first described by Pieter Cramer in 1775. It is found in Sri Lanka, India and Indonesia.
