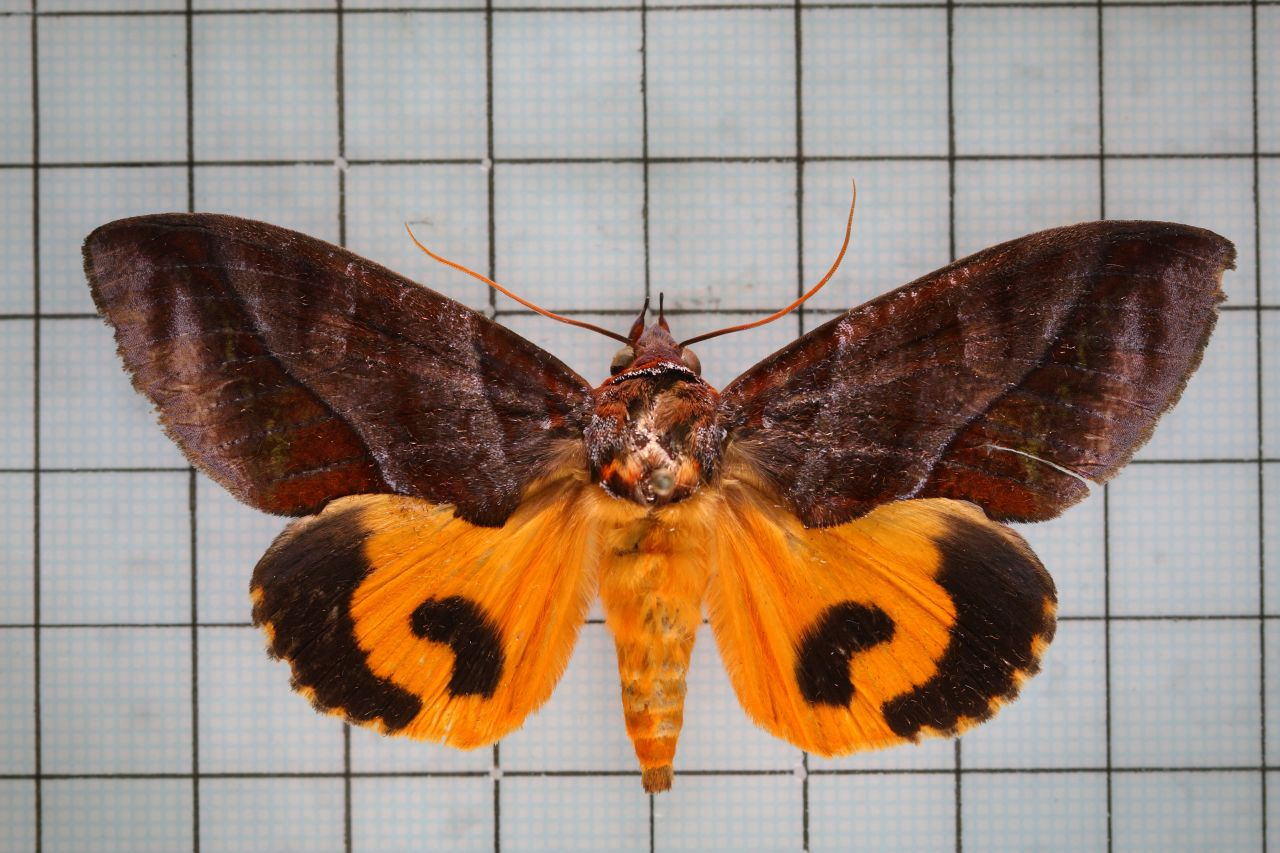
- Eudocima homaena

Scientific classification
- Domain: Eukaryota
- Kingdom: Animalia
- Phylum: Arthropoda
- Class: Insecta
- Order: Lepidoptera
- Superfamily: Noctuoidea
- Family: Erebidae
- Tribe: Ophiderini
- Genus: Eudocima; Billberg, 1820

Synonyms
- Acacalis Agassiz, 1847; Acacallis Hübner, 1823; Adris Moore, 1881; Argadesa Moore, 1881; Corycia Hübner, 1823; Elygea Billberg, 1828; Eumaenas Hampson, 1924; Halastus Butler, 1892; Khadira Moore, 1881; Leptophara Billberg, 1828; Maenas Hübner, 1823; Ophideres Boisduval, 1832; Ophioderes Agassiz, 1847; Othreis Hübner, 1823; Othryis Agassiz, 1847; Purbia Moore, 1881; Rhytia Hübner, 1823; Trissophaes Hübner, 1823; Vandana Moore, 1881

= Eudocima =

Genus of moths

Eudocima is a genus of moths of the family Erebidae with numerous tropical species. The genus was first categorised by Gustaf Johan Billberg in 1820, and species currently in the genus have been placed under a range of other genera in the past. Adult moths in the genus are known for puncturing and feeding on the juices of fruits, because of which they are considered as pests by horticulturists.

== Description ==
Palpi with second joint thickened and reaching vertex of head, and blunt naked third joint. Antennae minutely ciliated in male. Metathorax have slight tufts. Abdomen clothed with coarse hair on dorsum. Tibia spineless and clothed with long hair. Forewings with arched costa and acute apex. Inner margin lobed and with tufts of hair near base and at outer angle. Larva with four pairs of abdominal prolegs, where first pair rudimentary.

== Species ==
The following species are recognized by Alberto Zilli and Willem Hogenes (2002).

- Eudocima anguina Schaus, 1911
- Eudocima apta Walker, 1857
- Eudocima aurantia Moore, 1877
- Eudocima bathyglypta Prout, 1928
- Eudocima behouneki Zilli & Hogenes, 2002
- Eudocima boseae Saalmüller, 1880
- Eudocima caesar Felder, 1861
- Eudocima cajeta Cramer, 1775
- Eudocima cocalus Cramer, 1777
- Eudocima collusoria Cramer, 1777
- Eudocima colubra Schaus, 1911
- Eudocima discrepans Walker, 1857
- Eudocima dividens Walker, 1857
- Eudocima divitiosa Walker, 1869
- Eudocima euryzona Hampson, 1926
- Eudocima felicia Stoll, 1790
- Eudocima formosa Griveaud & Viette, 1960
- Eudocima homaena Hübner, 1816
- Eudocima hypermnestra Cramer, 1780
- Eudocima imperator Boisduval, 1833
- Eudocima iridescens Lucas, 1894
- Eudocima jordani Holland, 1900
- Eudocima kinabaluensis Feige, 1976
- Eudocima kuehni Pagenstecher, 1886
- Eudocima materna Linnaeus, 1767
- Eudocima mazzeii Zilli & Hogenes, 2002
- Eudocima memorans Walker, 1857
- Eudocima mionopastea Hampson, 1926
- Eudocima muscigera Butler, 1882
- Eudocima nigricilia Prout, 1924
- Eudocima okurai Okano, 1964
- Eudocima paulii Robinson, 1968
- Eudocima phalonia Linnaeus, 1763
- Eudocima pratti Bethune-Baker, 1906
- Eudocima prattorum Prout, 1922
- Eudocima procus Cramer, 1777
- Eudocima prolai Zilli & Hogenes, 2002
- Eudocima salaminia Cramer, 1777
- Eudocima serpentifera Walker, 1857
- Eudocima sikhimensis Butler, 1895
- Eudocima smaragdipicta Walker, 1857
- Eudocima splendida Yoshimoto, 1999
- Eudocima strivijayana Bänziger, 1985
- Eudocima talboti Prout, 1922
- Eudocima toddi Zayas, 1965
- Eudocima treadawayi Zilli & Hogenes, 2002
- Eudocima tyrannus Guenée, 1852
