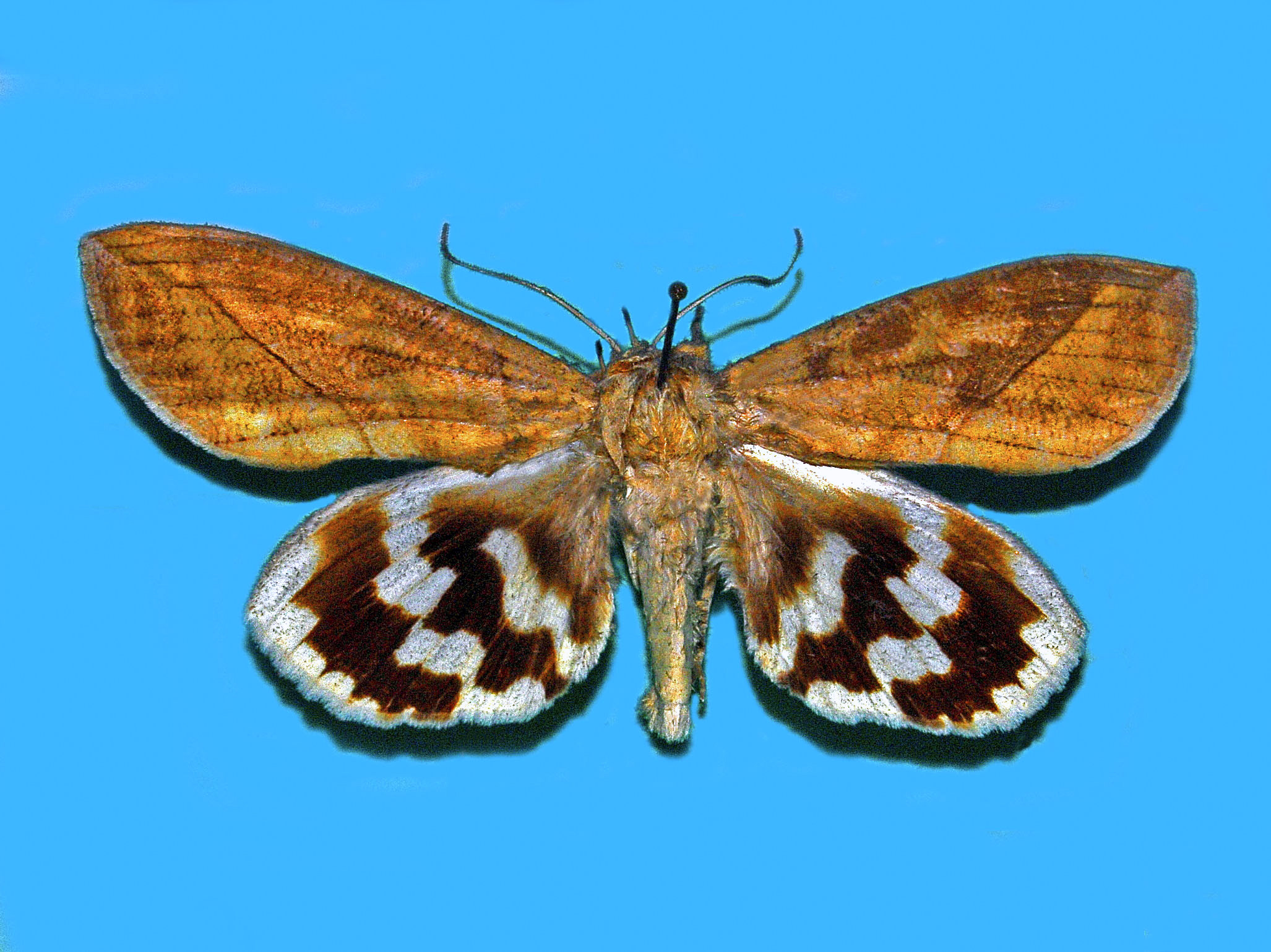
- Museum specimen

Scientific classification
- Domain: Eukaryota
- Kingdom: Animalia
- Phylum: Arthropoda
- Class: Insecta
- Order: Lepidoptera
- Superfamily: Noctuoidea
- Family: Erebidae
- Genus: Eudocima
- Species: E. procus

Binomial name
- Eudocima procus Cramer, 1777

Synonyms
- Phalaena procus Cramer, 1777; Ophideres columbina Guenée in Boisduval & Guenée 1852; Ophideres scabellum Guenée in Boisduval & Guenée 1852

= Eudocima procus =

Species of moth

Eudocima procus is a moth of the family Erebidae described by Pieter Cramer in 1777.

== Distribution ==
This species should be present in Suriname, Colombia, Peru, Brazil and Paraguay.
