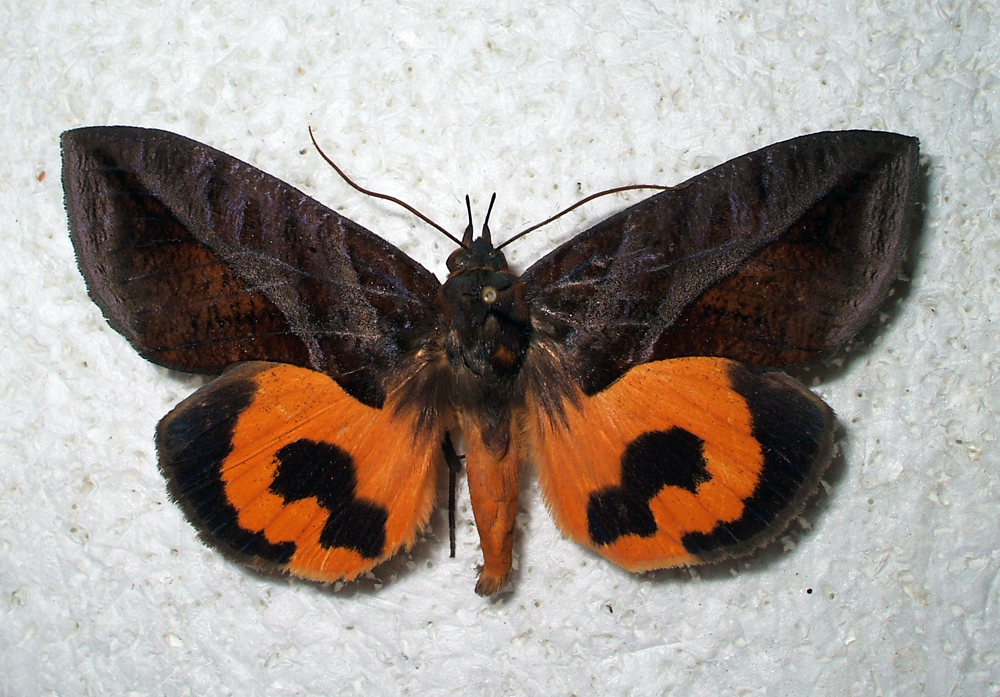

Scientific classification
- Kingdom: Animalia
- Phylum: Arthropoda
- Class: Insecta
- Order: Lepidoptera
- Superfamily: Noctuoidea
- Family: Erebidae
- Genus: Eudocima
- Species: E. serpentifera

Binomial name
- Eudocima serpentifera (Walker, 1858)

= Eudocima serpentifera =

Species of moth

Eudocima serpentifera is a species of fruit-piercing moth in the family Erebidae first described by Francis Walker in 1858. It is found in North America.

The MONA or Hodges number for Eudocima serpentifera is 8543.1.
