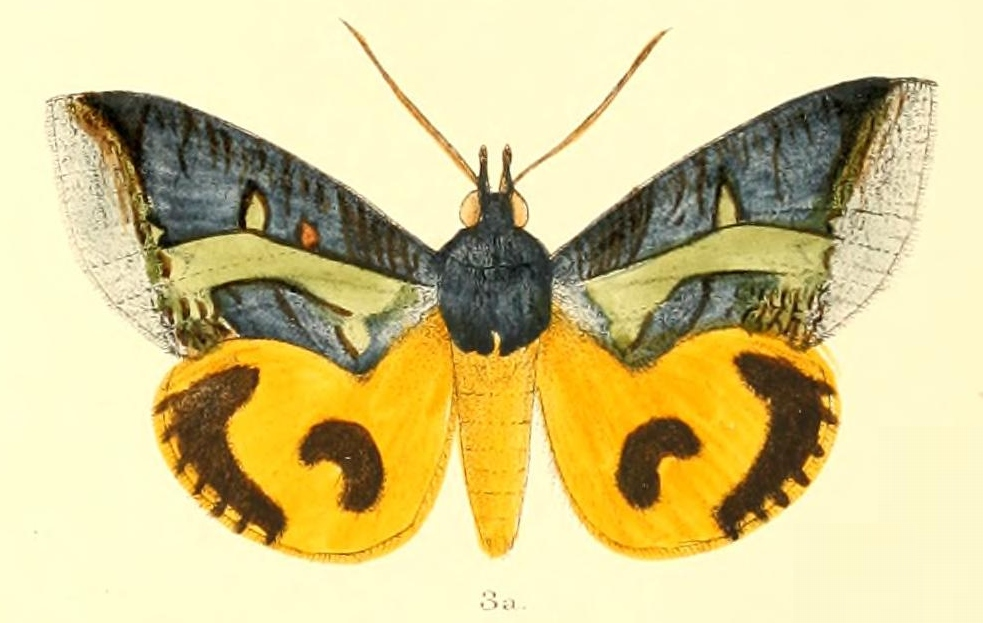
- Female
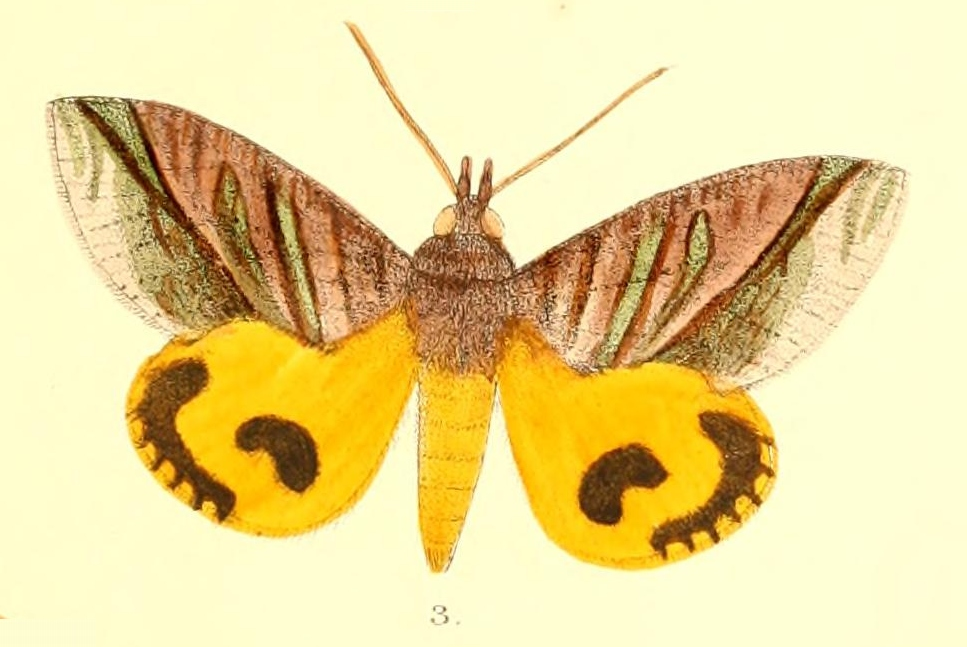
- Male

Scientific classification
- Kingdom: Animalia
- Phylum: Arthropoda
- Clade: Pancrustacea
- Class: Insecta
- Order: Lepidoptera
- Superfamily: Noctuoidea
- Family: Erebidae
- Genus: Eudocima
- Species: E. homaena

Binomial name
- Eudocima homaena (Hübner, 1816)

Synonyms
- Othreis homaena Hübner, 1823; Phalaena ancilla Cramer, 1777; Phalaena strigata Donovan, 1804; Ophideres bilineosa Walker, 1858; Othreis ancilla formosana Okano, 1964

= Eudocima homaena =

Species of moth

Eudocima homaena is a moth of the family Erebidae first described by Jacob Hübner in 1816. It is found in the Indian subregion, Sri Lanka, Myanmar, Taiwan, the Nicobars, Peninsular Malaysia, Borneo, the Philippines and on Christmas Island. It is a major pest on orange plants.

== Description ==
Its wingspan is about 80 mm. Palpi with third joint long and spatulate at extremity. Forewings with apex not produced. Outer margin rounded. Forewings with non-crenulate cilia. Male has fulvous brown head and thorax. The collar, metathoracic tufts and tibia with an orange tinge. Head and collar with a purple bloom. Abdomen orange. Forewings olive green, suffused with purplish red-brown and striated with rufous. Dark sub-basal and antemedial lines and slightly curved postmedial line present. There are traces of some waved medial lines. An indistinct reniform stigma and dentate sub-marginal line can be seen. Hindwings orange, with large black lunule beyond lower angle of cell. A submarginal band with waved edges runs from costa to vein 2. Ventral side of forewings with orange postmedial band.

Female has much darker forewings, with deep purple and chocolate tones. A broad verditer-green fascia found below the cell, sending bars to inner margin near base and outer angle, and conjoined to the green reniform spot.

Larva purplish brown with many blue specks and large yellow patch on 3rd, 4th and 5th somites. Fourth and fifth somites form ocelli with yellow iris and azure-blue black edged pupil. Somites 8 and 9 with irregular yellow patches. A dorsal tubercle found on 11th somite. Pupa orange colored, roughened and burnished. The larvae feed on Achyranthes, Cocculus, Cyclea peltata, Menispermum and Tiliacora species.

Gallery

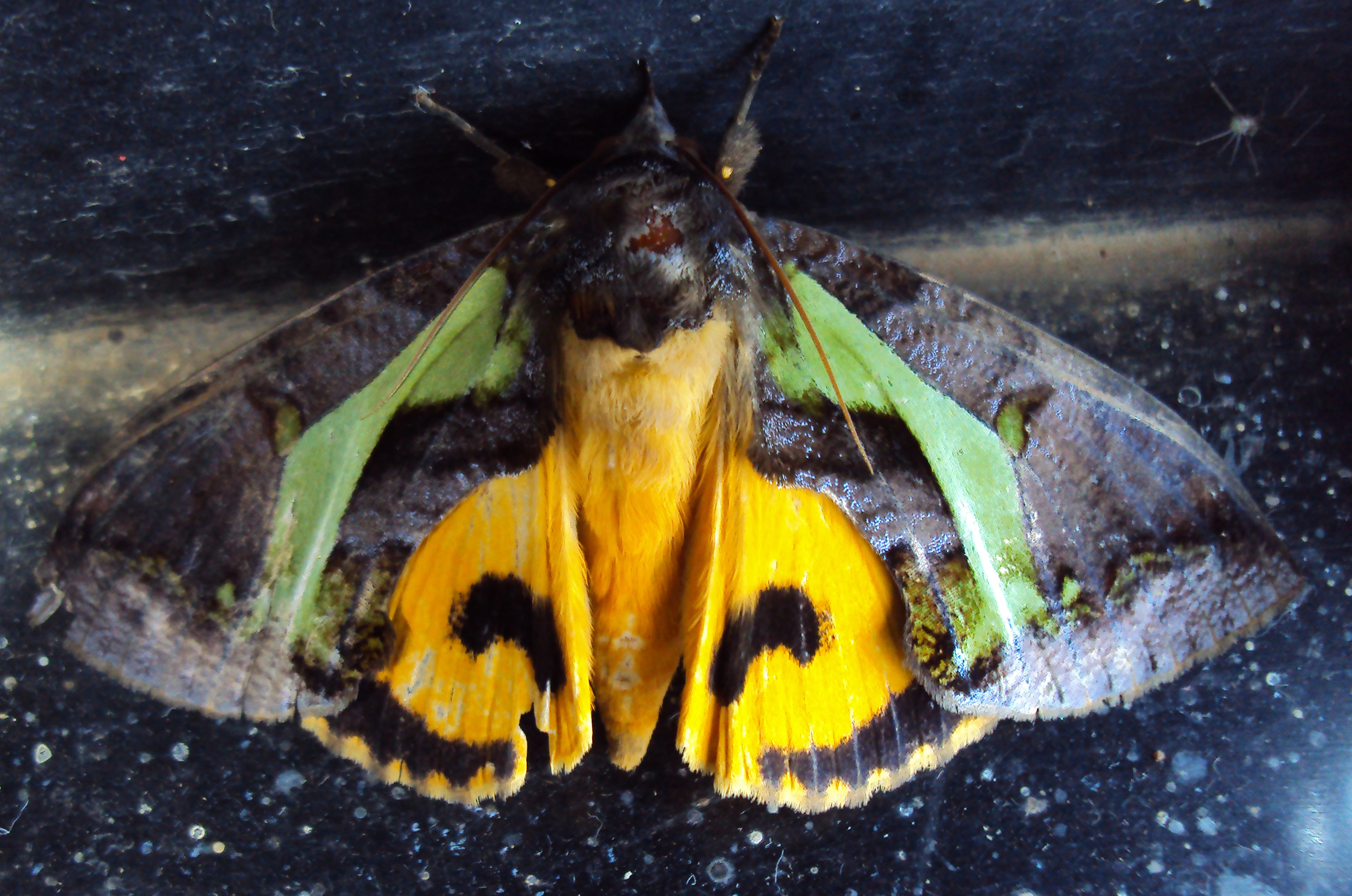
Female

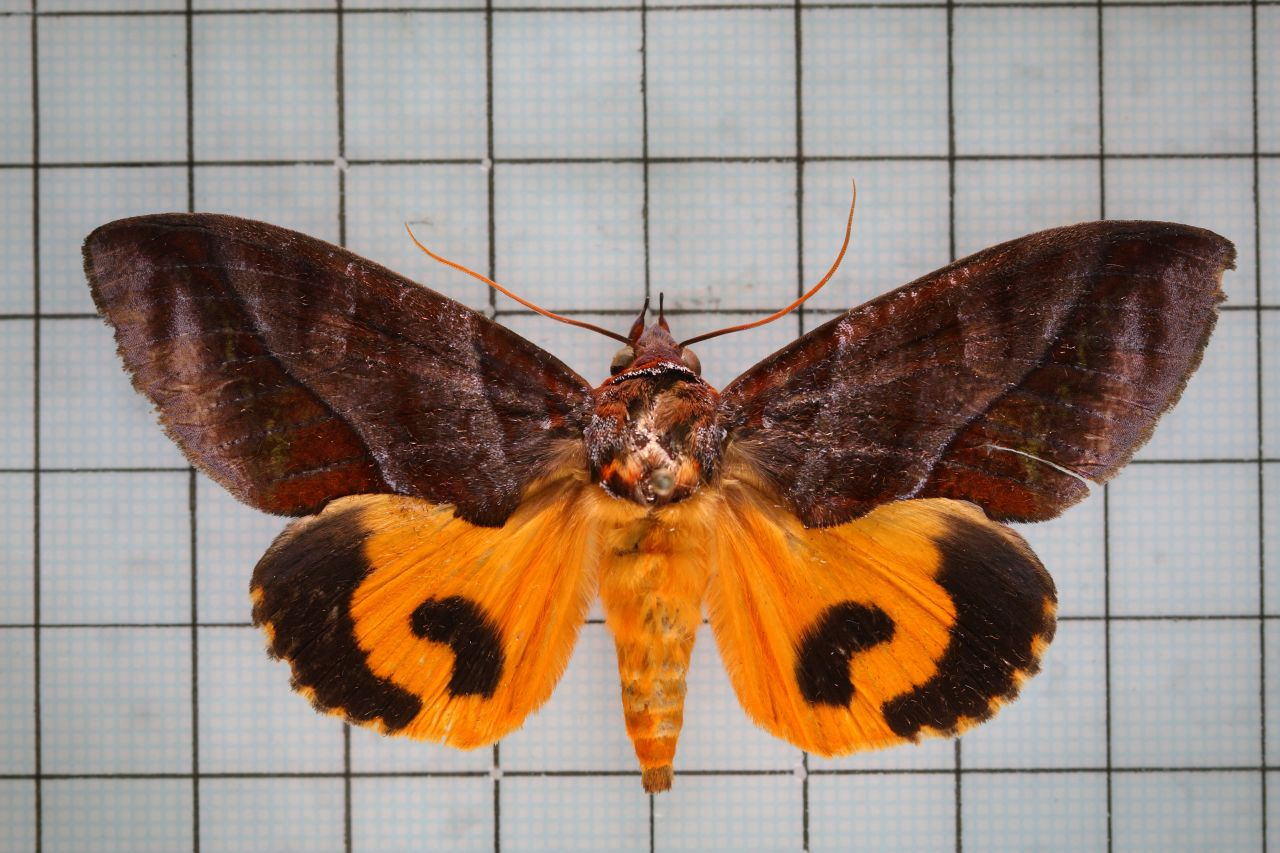
Male

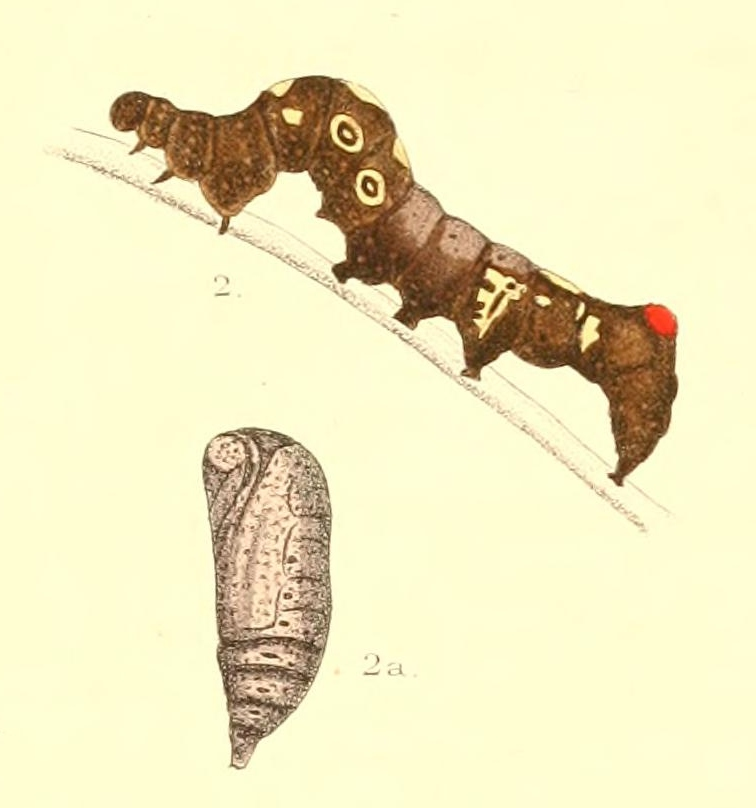
Caterpillar and pupa

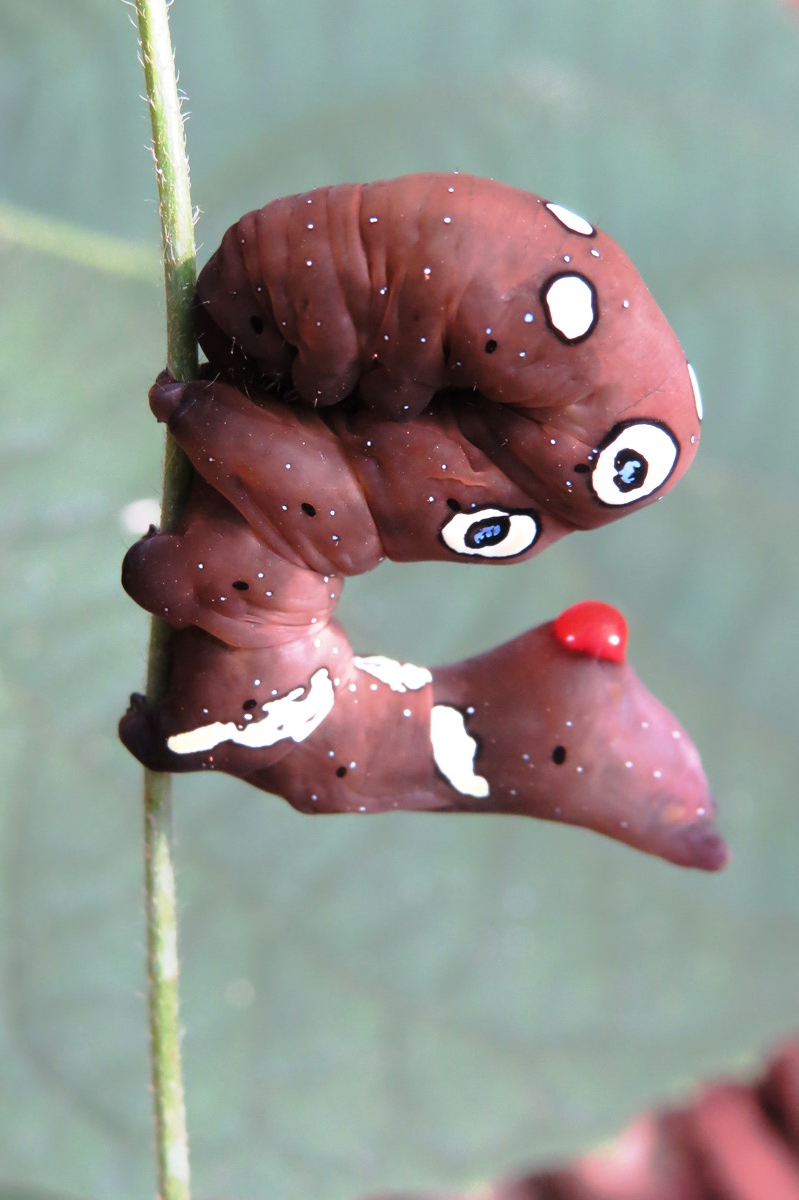
Caterpillar

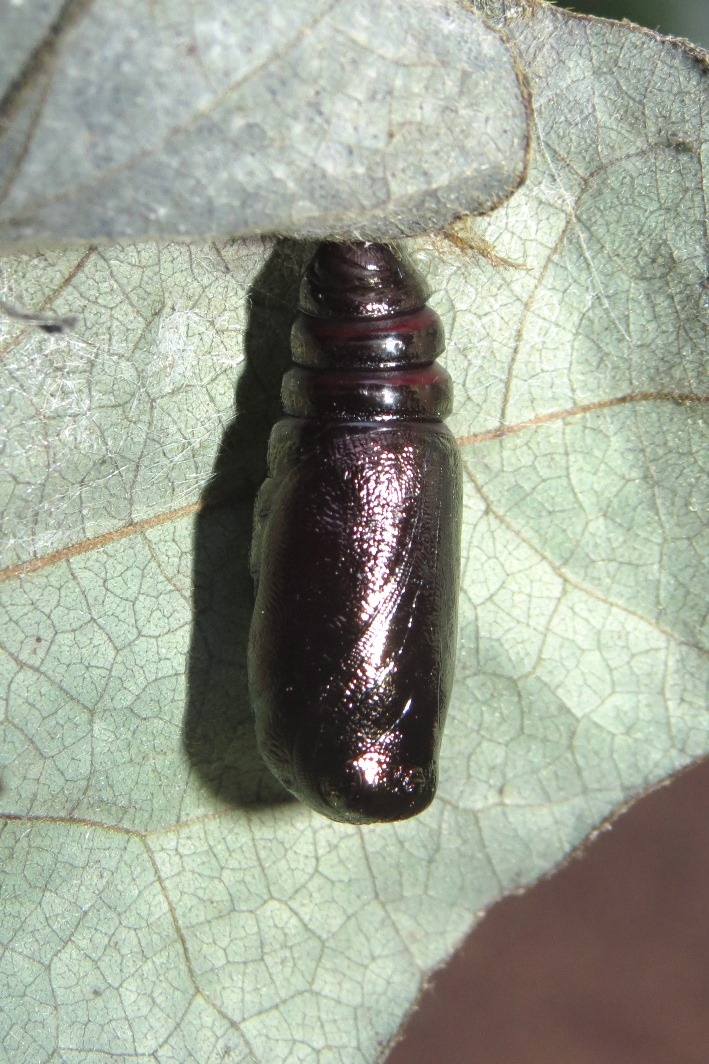
Pupa

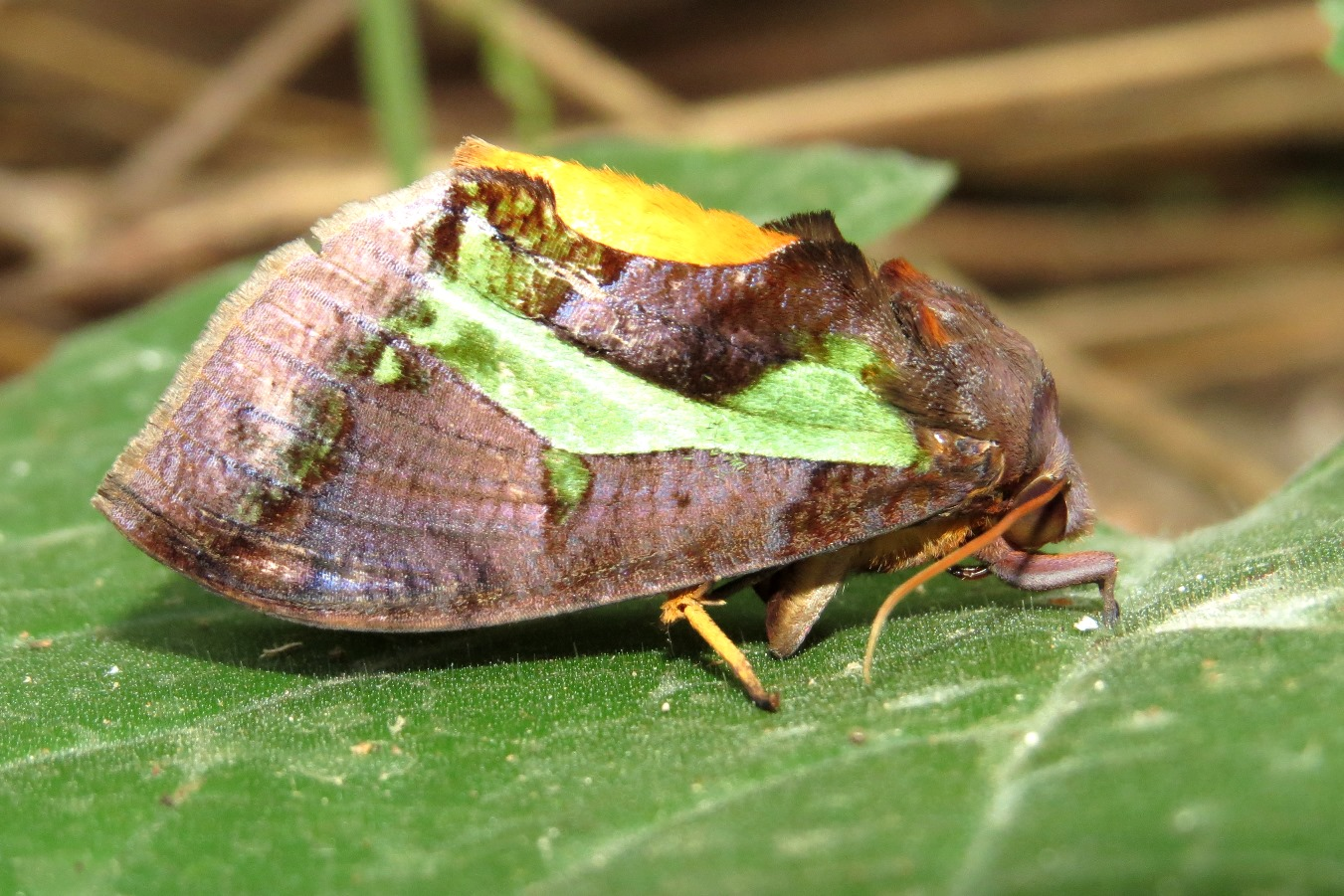
Adult lateral view
