= Eudocima anguina =

Scientific classification
- Domain: Eukaryota
- Kingdom: Animalia
- Phylum: Arthropoda
- Class: Insecta
- Order: Lepidoptera
- Superfamily: Noctuoidea
- Family: Erebidae
- Genus: Eudocima
- Species: E. anguina

Binomial name
- Eudocima anguina (Schaus, 1911)

Synonyms
- Trissophaes anguina Schaus, 1911

Species of moth

Eudocima anguina is a moth of the family Erebidae first described by William Schaus in 1911. It is found in South America and in most of Costa Rica.
