= Pycnarrhena =

Scientific classification
- Kingdom: Plantae
- Clade: Tracheophytes
- Clade: Angiosperms
- Clade: Eudicots
- Order: Ranunculales
- Family: Menispermaceae
- Genus: Pycnarrhena; Miers ex Hook.f. & Thomson

Synonyms
- Antitaxis Miers; Batania Hatus.; Gabila Baill.; Pridania Gagnep.; Telotia Pierre

Genus of plants

Pycnarrhena is a genus of flowering plants belonging to the family Menispermaceae. Its native range is tropical and subtropical Asia to Australia.

== Description ==
All species are either lianes or scrambling shrubs, without spines or barbs. The petioles (leaf stems) are swollen at the base and usually also at the attachment with the leaf blade. The plants are dioecious, meaning that male and female flowers are borne on separate plants. Inflorescences appear on the woody stems or in the leaf axils. The fruit are drupes.

== Distribution ==
The species of Pycnarrhena predominantly inhabit rainforests, and are variously native to the following regions as defined in the World Geographical Scheme for Recording Plant Distributions:

- Indian subcontinent: Assam, Bangladesh, East Himalaya
- China: China South-Central, Hainan
- Indo-China: Andaman Islands, Cambodia, Laos, Myanmar, Nicobar Islands, Thailand, Vietnam
- Malesia: Borneo, Jawa, Lesser Sunda Islands, Malaya, Maluku, Philippines, Sulawesi, Sumatera
- Papuasia: Bismarck Archipelago, New Guinea, Solomon Islands
- Australia: Queensland
- Southwestern Pacific: Vanuatu

== Taxonomy ==
Pycnarrhena is placed in the tribe Tiliacoreae of the family Menispermaceae, and is sister to the genera Chondrodendron, Curarea, Carronia, Triclisia, Tiliacora, Beirnaertia, and Albertisia. Pycnarrhena was established in 1855 by botanist John Miers with the sole species P. planiflora.

As of April 2026, Plants of the World Online accepts the following 15 species:

- Pycnarrhena calocarpa (Kurz) Diels
- Pycnarrhena cauliflora (Miers) Diels
- Pycnarrhena fasciculata (Miers) Diels
- Pycnarrhena heptandra I.M.Turner
- Pycnarrhena insignis (Hatus.) Forman
- Pycnarrhena longifolia (Decne. ex Miq.) Becc.
- Pycnarrhena lucida (Teijsm. & Binn.) Miq.
- Pycnarrhena manillensis S.Vidal
- Pycnarrhena montana Backer
- Pycnarrhena nodiflora (Pierre) I.M.Turner
- Pycnarrhena novoguineensis Miq.
- Pycnarrhena ozantha Diels
- Pycnarrhena planiflora Miers ex Hook.f. & Thomson
- Pycnarrhena poilanei (Gagnep.) Forman
- Pycnarrhena tumefacta Miers
