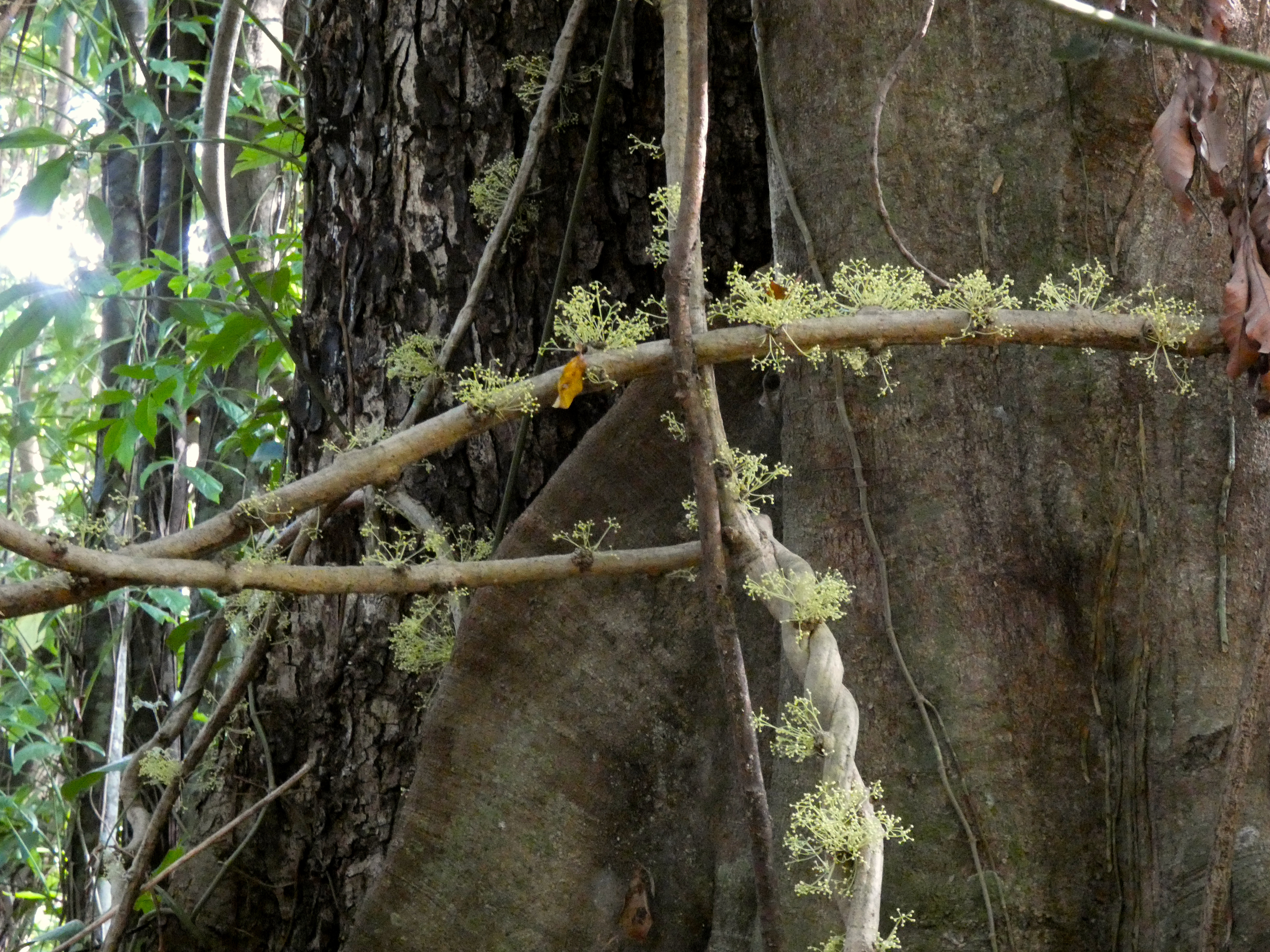

Conservation status
- Least Concern (NCA)

Scientific classification
- Kingdom: Plantae
- Clade: Tracheophytes
- Clade: Angiosperms
- Clade: Eudicots
- Order: Ranunculales
- Family: Menispermaceae
- Genus: Pycnarrhena
- Species: P. novoguineensis

Binomial name
- Pycnarrhena novoguineensis Miq.

Synonyms
- Pycnarrhena australiana F.Muell.; Pycnarrhena grandis K.Schum. & Lauterb.; Pycnarrhena sayeri Diels

= Pycnarrhena novoguineensis =

Species of flowering plant

Pycnarrhena novoguineensis, commonly known as common milk vine, is a species of plant in the family Menispermaceae. It is a liane native to New Guinea and northeast Queensland, Australia, where it is found in lowland rainforest. It was first described in 1868.

== Description ==
Pycnarrhena novoguineensis is a woody vine growing to about 3 cm (1.2 in) diameter. The glossy green leaves are elliptic to oblong-elliptic, and measure up to 25 cm (9.8 in) long by 11 cm (4.3 in) wide. They are attached to the twigs by petioles (leaf stems) up to 3.5 cm (1.4 in) long, which have a large pulvinus (a swelling where the petiole attaches to the leaf blade, allowing the leaf to rotate and follow the sun).

Inflorescences are produced in the leaf axils or directly from the old wood of the stem, and consist of cymose clusters up to 9 cm (3.5 in) long. The flowers are small, having three or four petals about 1 mm (0.04 in) long and three to six sepals about 2 mm (0.08 in) long. The fruit is a red to yellow drupe about 1 cm (0.39 in) long.

== Distribution and habitat ==
This plant is fount in lowland rainforest and gallery forest, at altitudes up to 200 m (660 ft). Its native range is New Guinea and the eastern coastal areas of Cape York Peninsula, Australia, as far south as about Lucinda.

== Conservation ==
This species is listed as least concern under the Queensland Government's Nature Conservation Act. As of 7 April 2026, it has not been assessed by the International Union for Conservation of Nature (IUCN).

== Gallery ==
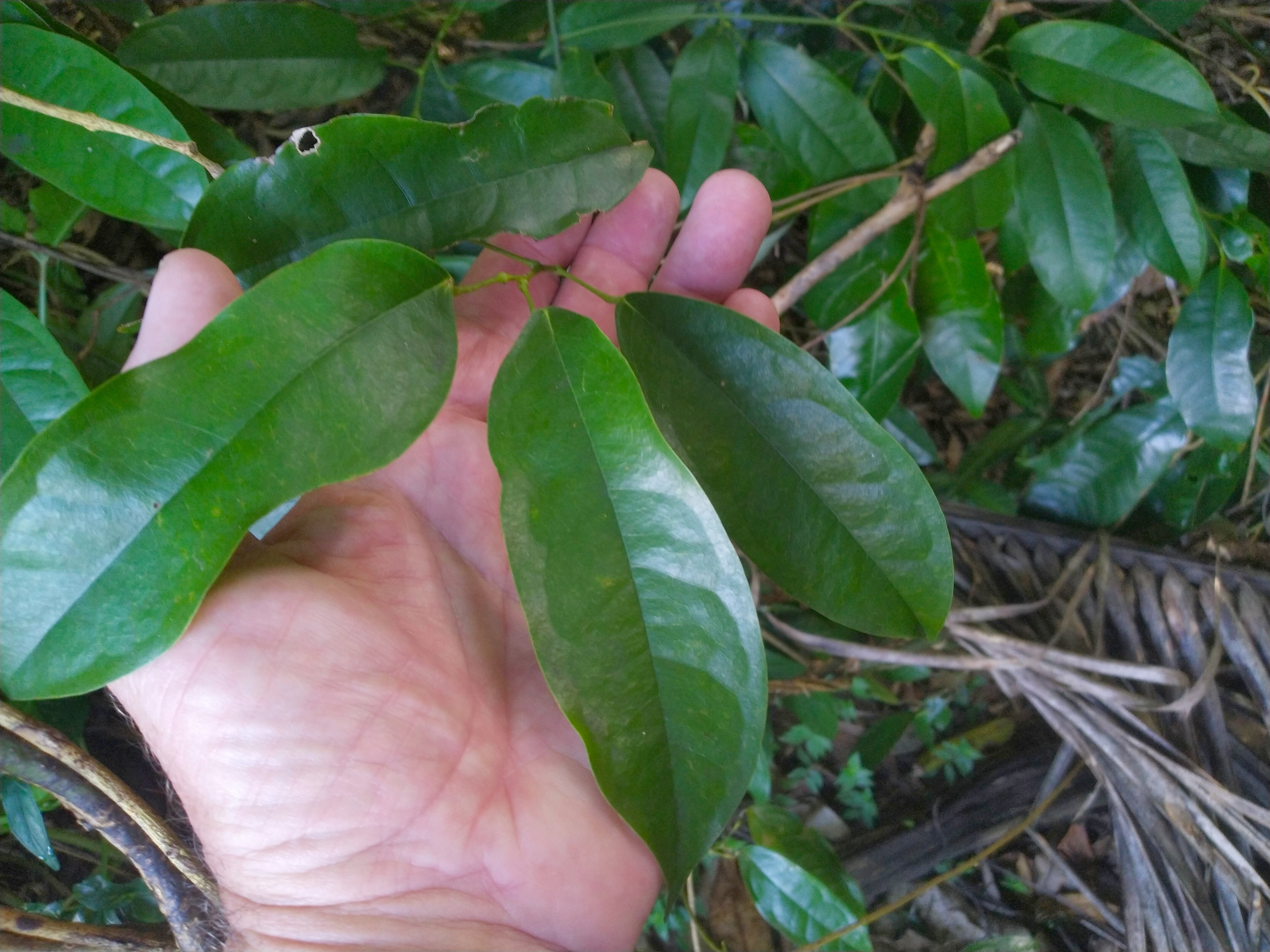
Leaves

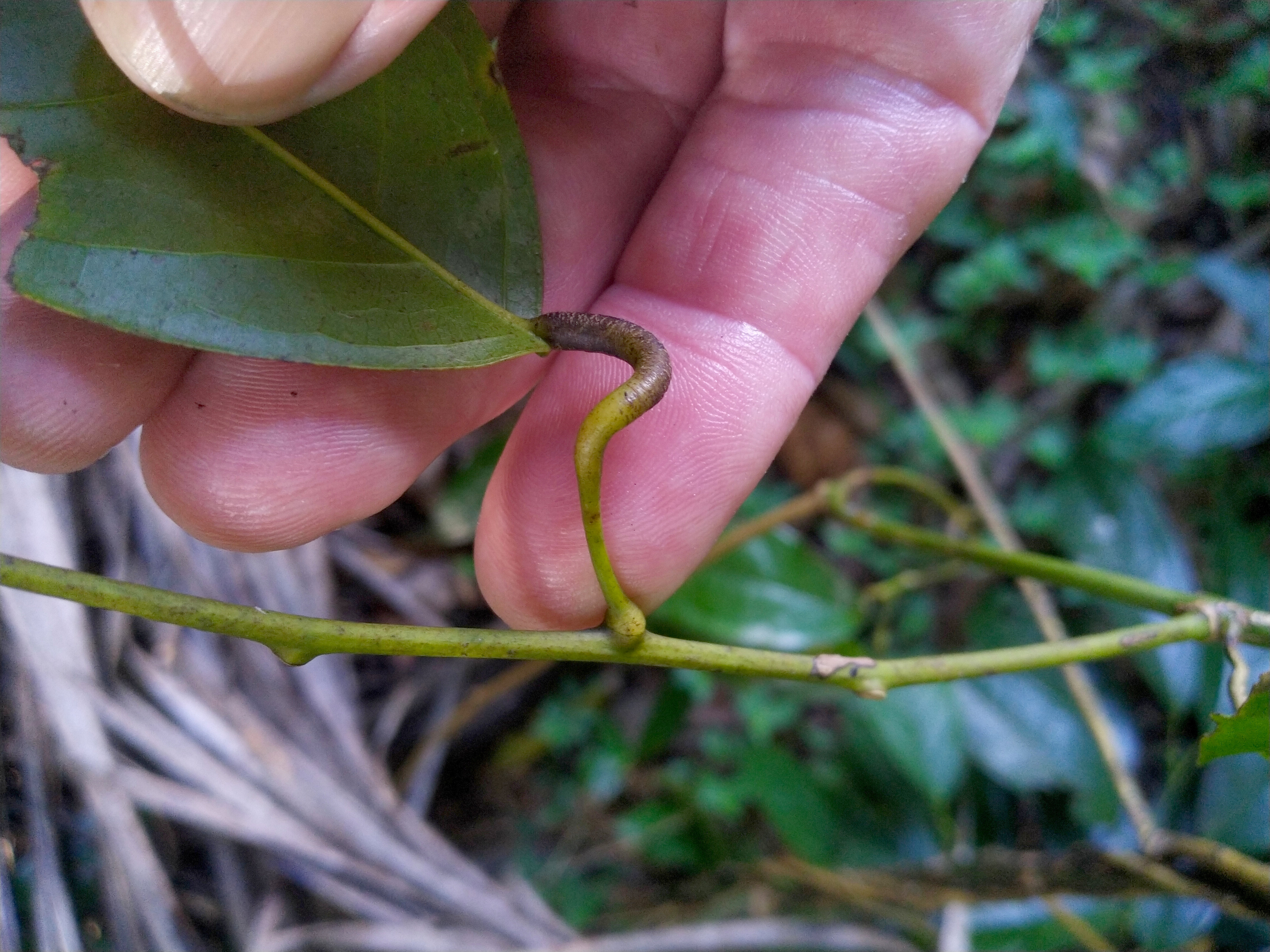
Petiole and pulvinus

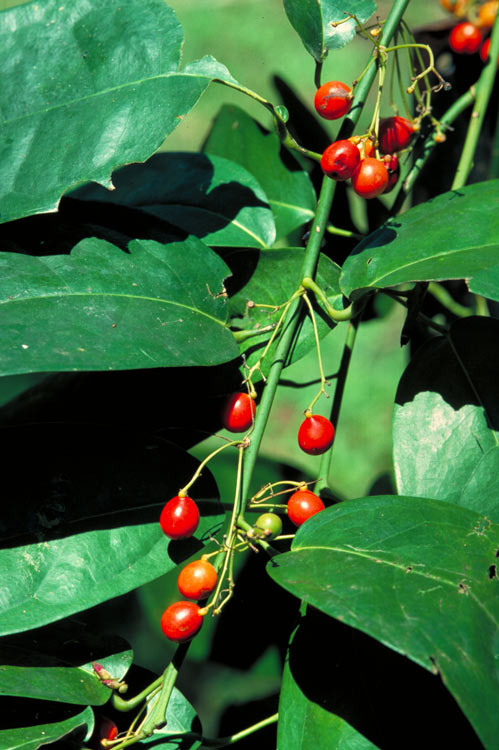
Ripe fruit
