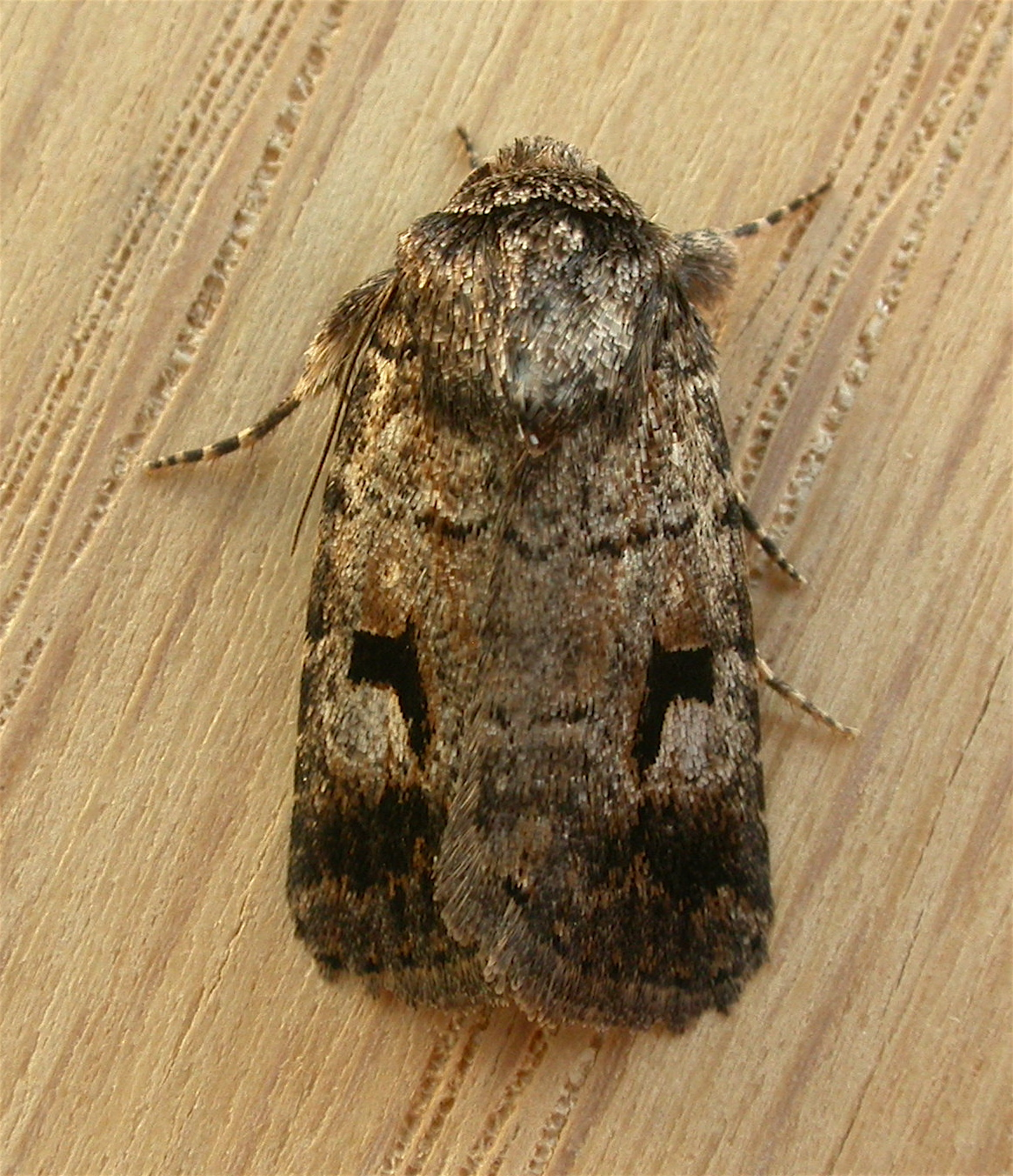
- Proteuxoa species, to MV light, Aranda, ACT, 24/25 September 2008. This is a species close to Proteuxoa flexirena, possibly verecunda.

Scientific classification
- Kingdom: Animalia
- Phylum: Arthropoda
- Class: Insecta
- Order: Lepidoptera
- Superfamily: Noctuoidea
- Family: Noctuidae
- Genus: Proteuxoa
- Species: P. verecunda

Binomial name
- Proteuxoa verecunda (Walker, 1858)

Synonyms
- Celaena verecunda Walker, 1858

= Proteuxoa verecunda =

Species of moth

Proteuxoa verecunda is a moth of the family Noctuidae. It is found in the Australian Capital Territory, New South Wales and Western Australia.
