= Proteuxoa spilocrossa =

Scientific classification
- Domain: Eukaryota
- Kingdom: Animalia
- Phylum: Arthropoda
- Class: Insecta
- Order: Lepidoptera
- Superfamily: Noctuoidea
- Family: Noctuidae
- Genus: Proteuxoa
- Species: P. spilocrossa

Binomial name
- Proteuxoa spilocrossa (Turner, 1915)

Synonyms
- Ariathisa spilocrossa Turner, 1915

Species of moth

Proteuxoa spilocrossa is a moth of the family Noctuidae. It is found in Western Australia.
