= Proteuxoa gypsina =

Scientific classification
- Domain: Eukaryota
- Kingdom: Animalia
- Phylum: Arthropoda
- Class: Insecta
- Order: Lepidoptera
- Superfamily: Noctuoidea
- Family: Noctuidae
- Genus: Proteuxoa
- Species: P. gypsina

Binomial name
- Proteuxoa gypsina (Lower, 1897)

Synonyms
- Agrotis gypsina Lower, 1897

Species of moth

Proteuxoa gypsina is a moth of the family Noctuidae. It is found in South Australia and Western Australia.
