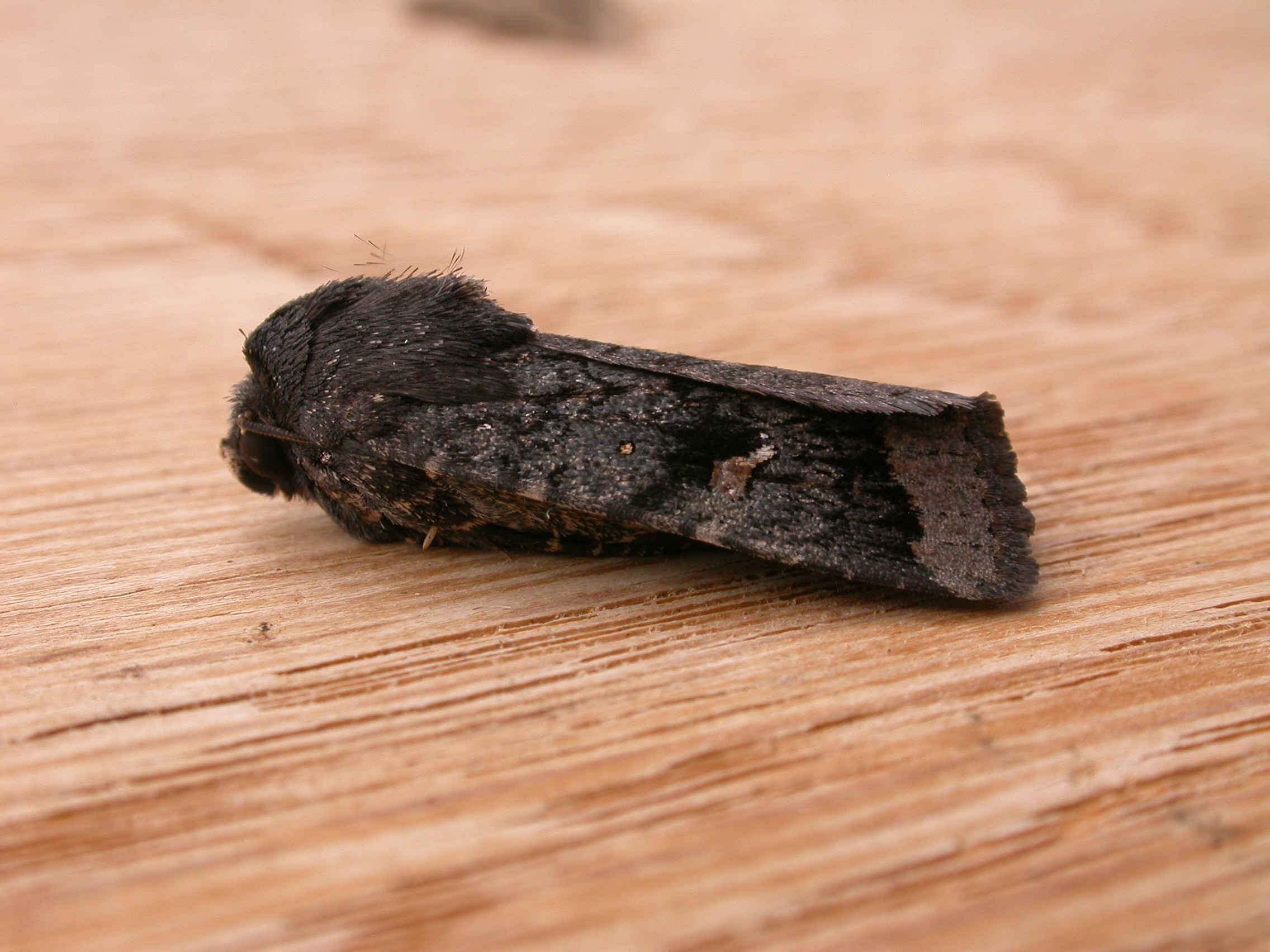

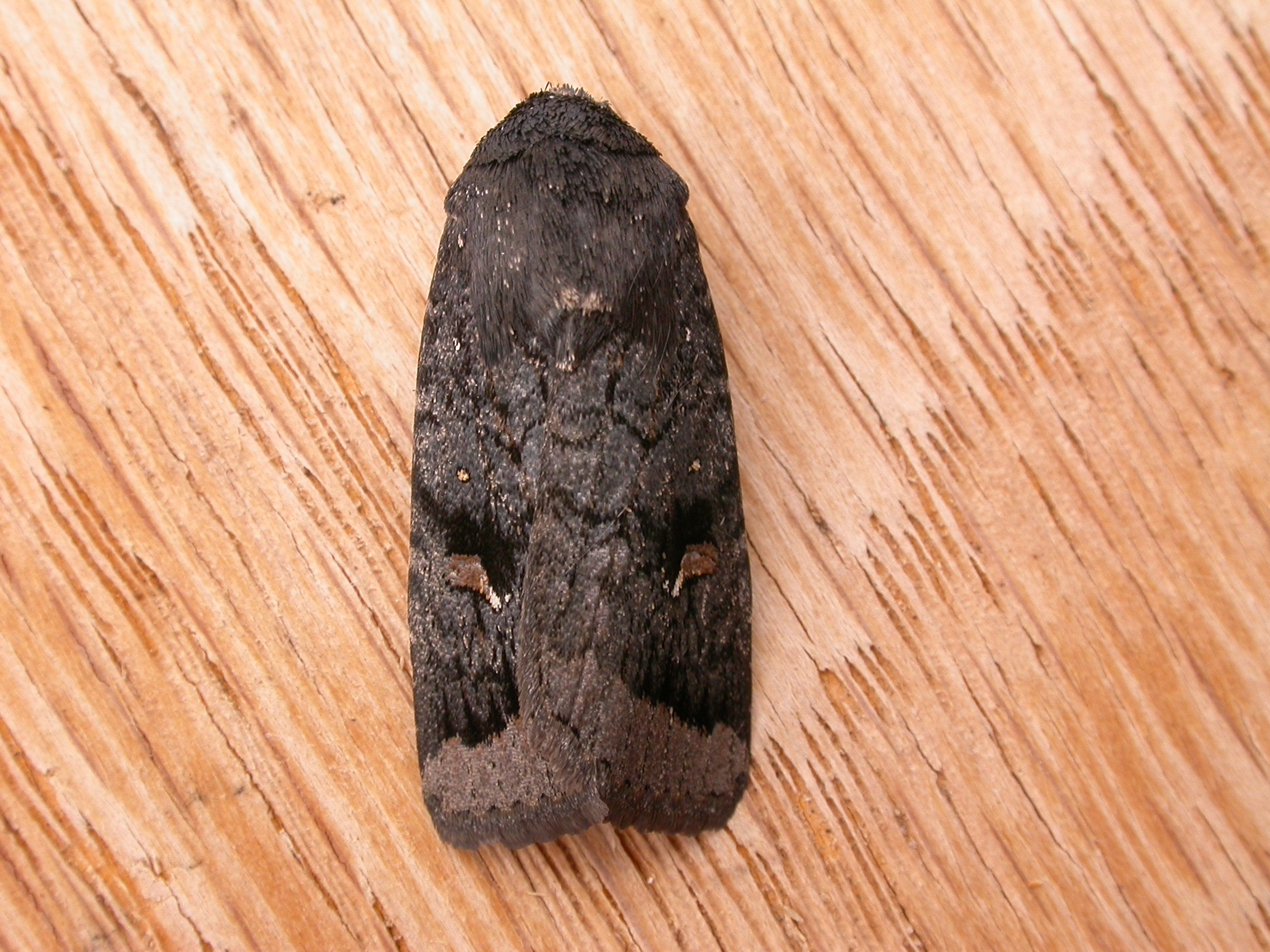

Scientific classification
- Kingdom: Animalia
- Phylum: Arthropoda
- Class: Insecta
- Order: Lepidoptera
- Superfamily: Noctuoidea
- Family: Noctuidae
- Genus: Proteuxoa
- Species: P. atra

Binomial name
- Proteuxoa atra (Guenée, 1852)

Synonyms
- Agrotis atra Guenée, 1852; Mamestra lucifera Walker, 1865

= Proteuxoa atra =

Species of moth

Proteuxoa atra is a moth of the family Noctuidae. It is found in the Australian Capital Territory, New South Wales, Tasmania and Victoria.

Adults have dark brown patterned forewings.
