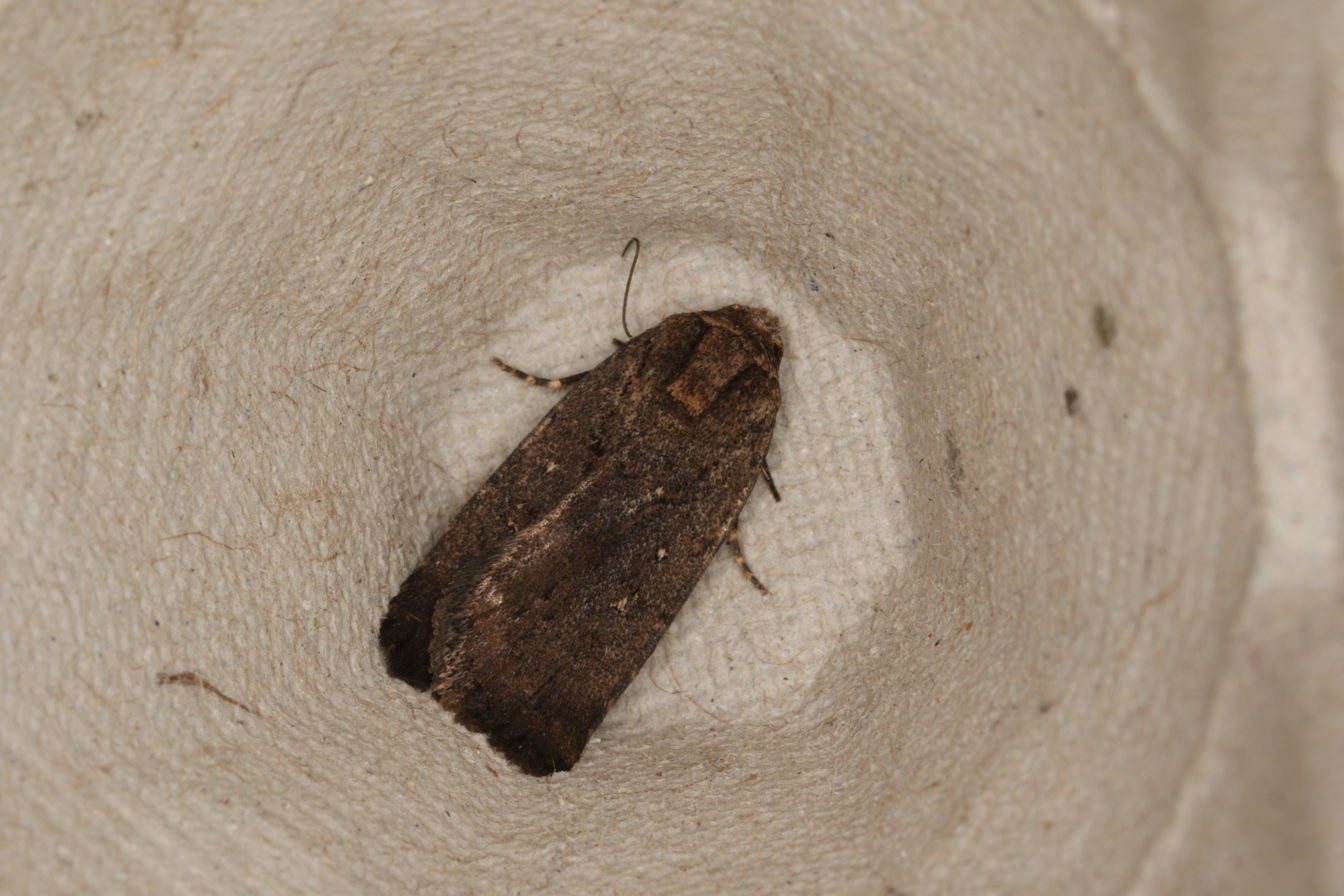

Scientific classification
- Domain: Eukaryota
- Kingdom: Animalia
- Phylum: Arthropoda
- Class: Insecta
- Order: Lepidoptera
- Superfamily: Noctuoidea
- Family: Noctuidae
- Genus: Proteuxoa
- Species: P. nycteris

Binomial name
- Proteuxoa nycteris (Turner, 1908)

Synonyms
- Caradrina nycteris Turner, 1908; Caradrina basisticha Turner, 1908

= Proteuxoa nycteris =

Species of moth

Proteuxoa nycteris is a moth of the family Noctuidae. It is found in New South Wales, Queensland and Western Australia.
