= Proteuxoa spodias =

Scientific classification
- Domain: Eukaryota
- Kingdom: Animalia
- Phylum: Arthropoda
- Class: Insecta
- Order: Lepidoptera
- Superfamily: Noctuoidea
- Family: Noctuidae
- Genus: Proteuxoa
- Species: P. spodias

Binomial name
- Proteuxoa spodias Turner, 1908

Species of moth

Proteuxoa spodias is a moth of the family Noctuidae. It is found in the Australian Capital Territory, Tasmania and Victoria.
