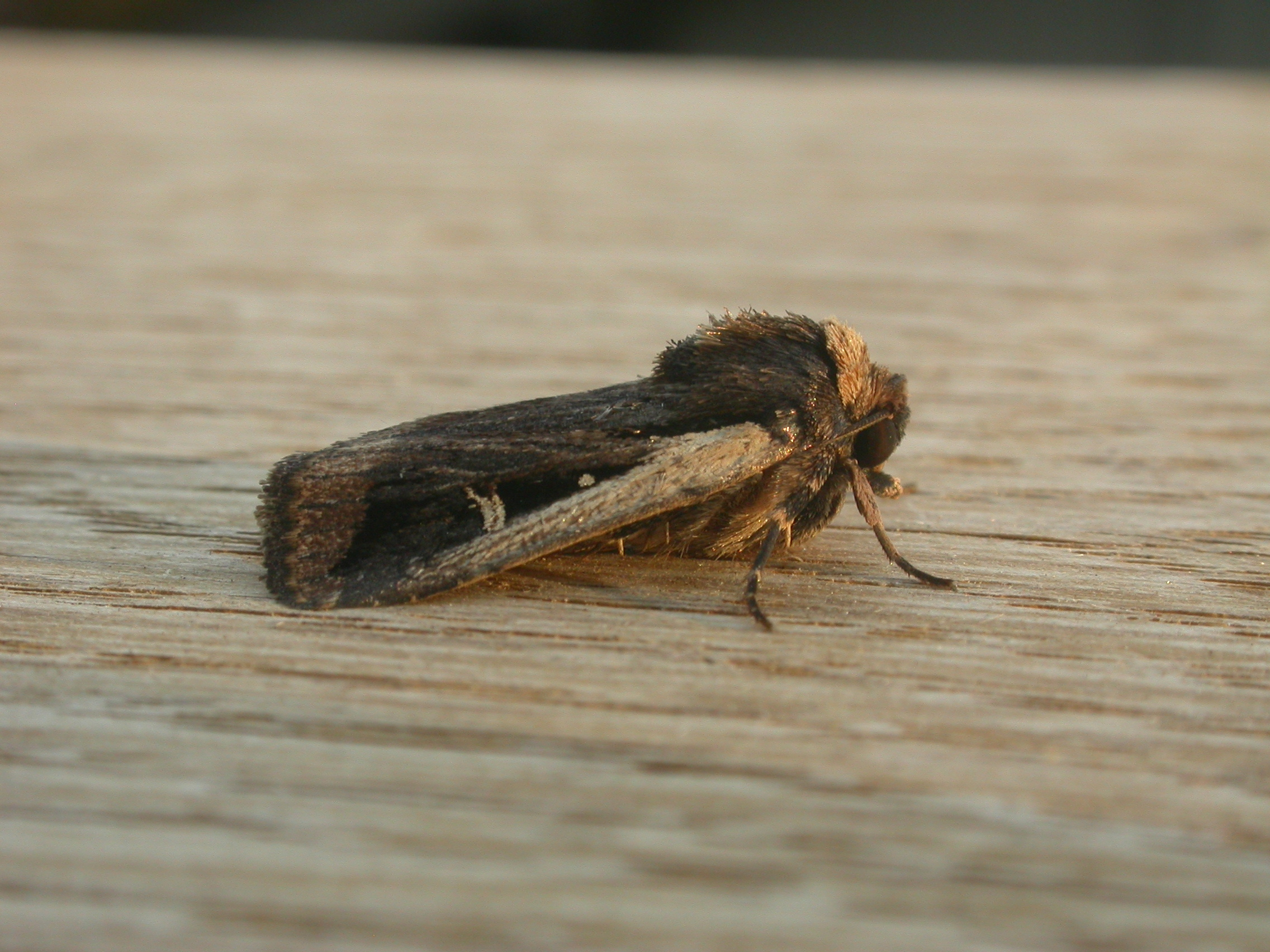

Scientific classification
- Kingdom: Animalia
- Phylum: Arthropoda
- Class: Insecta
- Order: Lepidoptera
- Superfamily: Noctuoidea
- Family: Noctuidae
- Genus: Proteuxoa
- Species: P. tortisigna

Binomial name
- Proteuxoa tortisigna (Walker, 1857)

Synonyms
- Ochropleura tortisigna Walker, 1857; Agrotis costalis Walker, 1869; Agrotis antipoda Felder & Rogenhofer, 1874

= Proteuxoa tortisigna =

Streaked rictonis moth

Species of moth

Proteuxoa tortisigna, the streaked rictonis moth or pale-banded noctuid, is a moth of the family Noctuidae. The species was first described by Francis Walker in 1857. It is found in the Australian Capital Territory, New South Wales, Queensland, Tasmania and Victoria

The wingspan is about 30 mm.

The larvae feed on Poaceae species, Pelargonium × zonale and Narcissus pseudonarcissus.
