= Proteuxoa nyctereutica =

Scientific classification
- Domain: Eukaryota
- Kingdom: Animalia
- Phylum: Arthropoda
- Class: Insecta
- Order: Lepidoptera
- Superfamily: Noctuoidea
- Family: Noctuidae
- Genus: Proteuxoa
- Species: P. nyctereutica

Binomial name
- Proteuxoa nyctereutica (Turner, 1941)

Synonyms
- Dinoprora nyctereutica Turner, 1942

Species of moth

Proteuxoa nyctereutica is a moth of the family Noctuidae. It is found in Western Australia.
