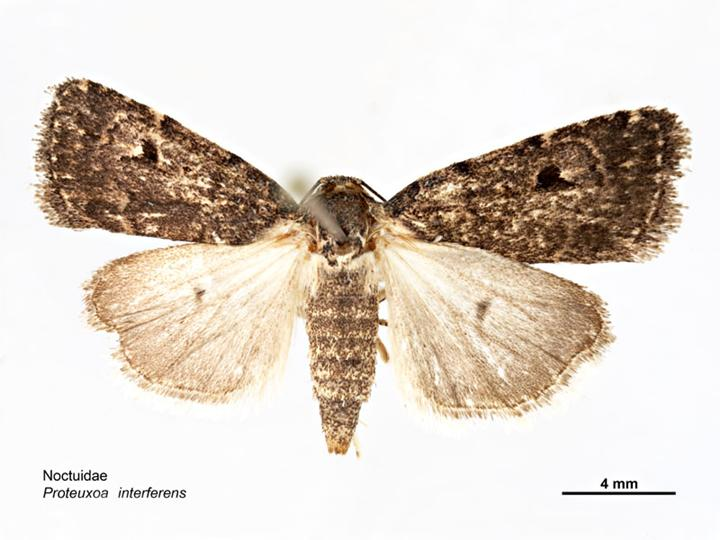
- Dorsal view
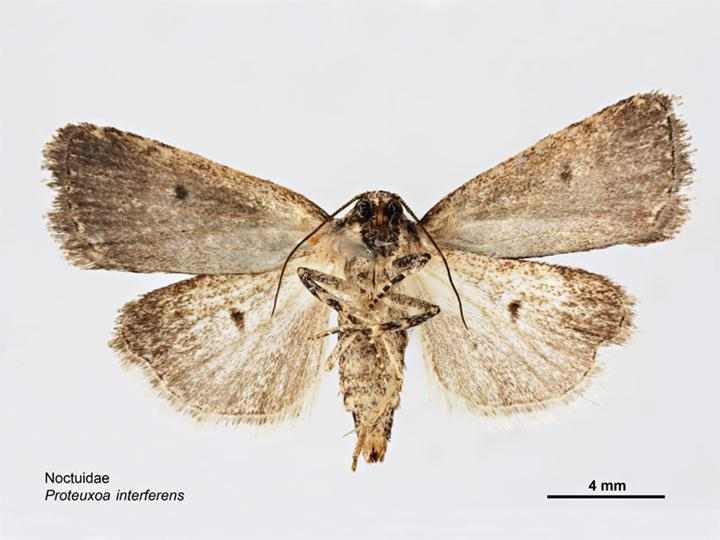
- Ventral view

Scientific classification
- Kingdom: Animalia
- Phylum: Arthropoda
- Class: Insecta
- Order: Lepidoptera
- Superfamily: Noctuoidea
- Family: Noctuidae
- Genus: Proteuxoa
- Species: P. interferens

Binomial name
- Proteuxoa interferens (Walker, 1857)

Synonyms
- Dianthaecia interferens Walker, 1857

= Proteuxoa interferens =

Species of moth

Proteuxoa interferens is a moth of the family Noctuidae. It is found in the Australian Capital Territory, New South Wales and South Australia.
