= Proteuxoa senta =

Scientific classification
- Domain: Eukaryota
- Kingdom: Animalia
- Phylum: Arthropoda
- Class: Insecta
- Order: Lepidoptera
- Superfamily: Noctuoidea
- Family: Noctuidae
- Genus: Proteuxoa
- Species: P. senta

Binomial name
- Proteuxoa senta (Lower, 1902)

Synonyms
- Caradrina senta Lower, 1902; Caradrina amathodes Turner, 1908

Species of moth

Proteuxoa senta is a moth of the family Noctuidae. It is found in South Australia, Tasmania and Victoria.
