= Proteuxoa plaesiospila =

Scientific classification
- Domain: Eukaryota
- Kingdom: Animalia
- Phylum: Arthropoda
- Class: Insecta
- Order: Lepidoptera
- Superfamily: Noctuoidea
- Family: Noctuidae
- Genus: Proteuxoa
- Species: P. plaesiospila

Binomial name
- Proteuxoa plaesiospila (Turner, 1939)

Synonyms
- Thoracolopha plaesiospila Turner, 1939

Species of moth

Proteuxoa plaesiospila is a moth of the family Noctuidae. It is found in Australia, where it has been recorded from Queensland.
