= Proteuxoa confinis =

Scientific classification
- Kingdom: Animalia
- Phylum: Arthropoda
- Class: Insecta
- Order: Lepidoptera
- Superfamily: Noctuoidea
- Family: Noctuidae
- Genus: Proteuxoa
- Species: P. confinis

Binomial name
- Proteuxoa confinis (Walker, 1857)

Synonyms
- Celaena confinis Walker, 1857; Caradrina niphosticta Turner, 1925

Species of moth

Proteuxoa confinis is a moth of the family Noctuidae. It is found in New South Wales and Queensland, Australia.
