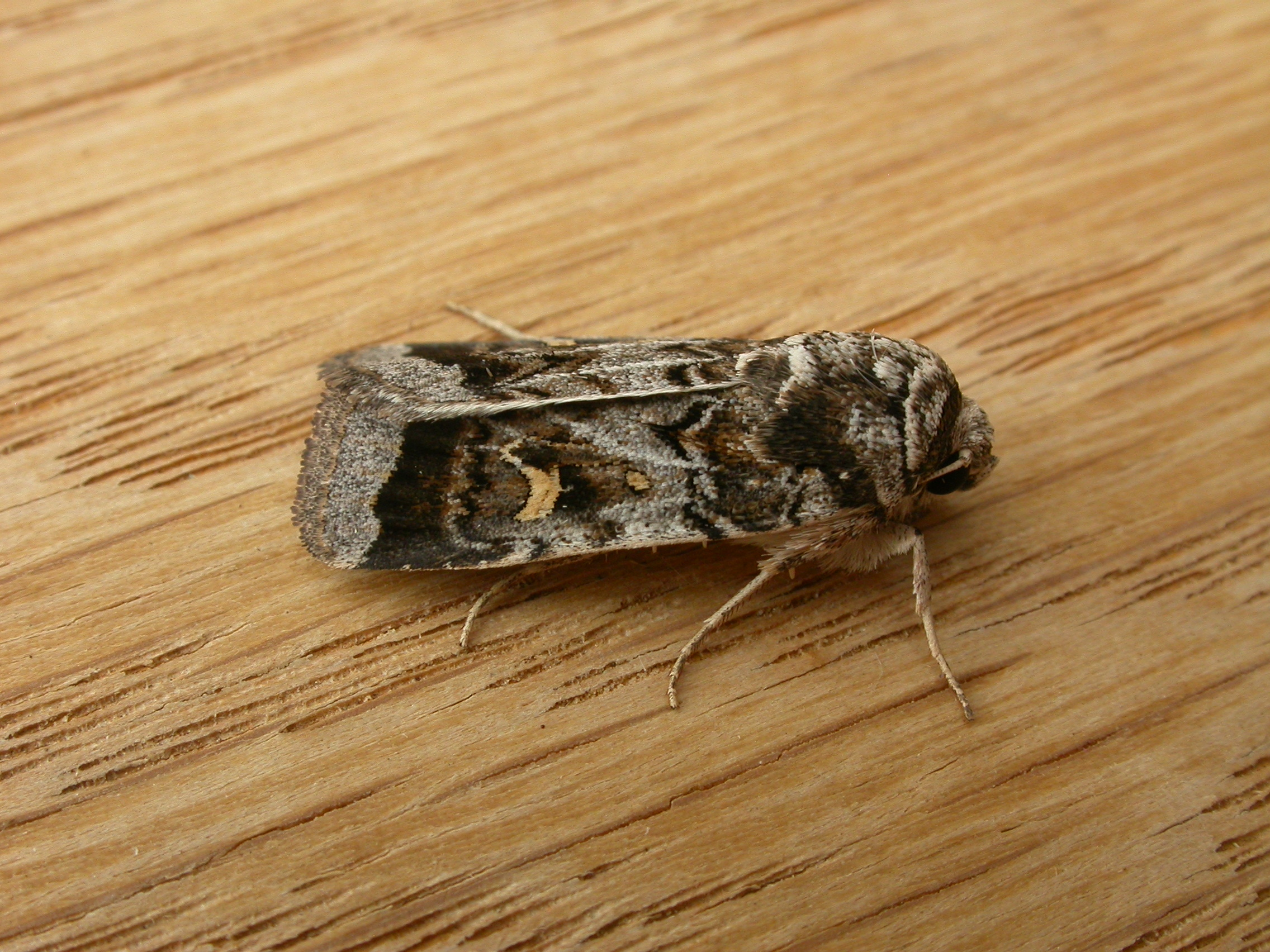

Scientific classification
- Domain: Eukaryota
- Kingdom: Animalia
- Phylum: Arthropoda
- Class: Insecta
- Order: Lepidoptera
- Superfamily: Noctuoidea
- Family: Noctuidae
- Genus: Proteuxoa
- Species: P. oxygona

Binomial name
- Proteuxoa oxygona (Lower, 1902)

Synonyms
- Caradrina oxygona Lower, 1902; Prometopus poliophracta Turner, 1908

= Proteuxoa oxygona =

Species of moth

Proteuxoa oxygona is a moth of the family Noctuidae. It is found in the Australian Capital Territory, New South Wales, South Australia, Tasmania and Victoria.

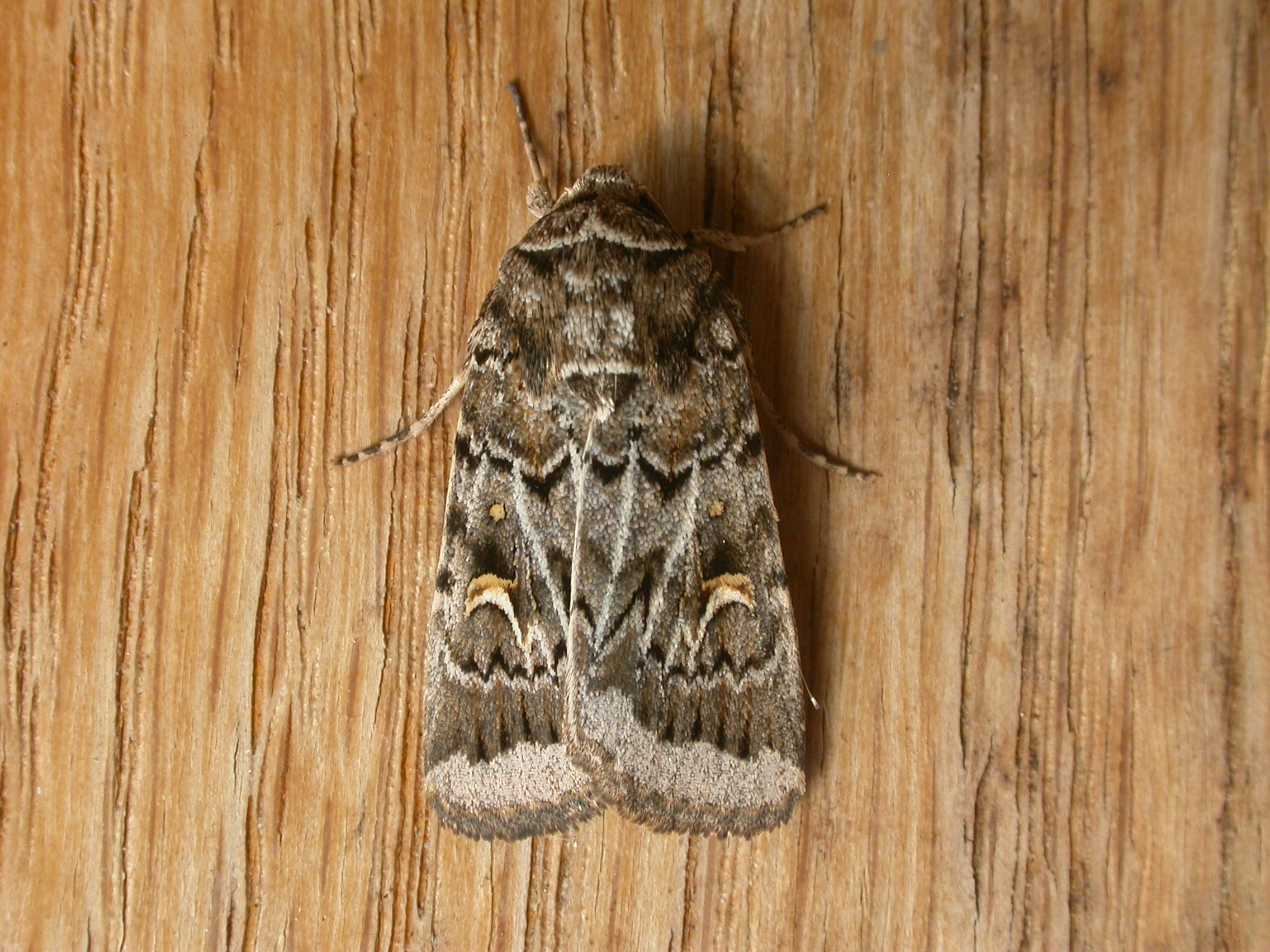
