= Proteuxoa melanographa =

Scientific classification
- Domain: Eukaryota
- Kingdom: Animalia
- Phylum: Arthropoda
- Class: Insecta
- Order: Lepidoptera
- Superfamily: Noctuoidea
- Family: Noctuidae
- Genus: Proteuxoa
- Species: P. melanographa

Binomial name
- Proteuxoa melanographa (Turner, 1908)

Synonyms
- Caradrina melanographa Turner, 1908; Ariathisa ochropepla Turner, 1911

Species of moth

Proteuxoa melanographa is a moth of the family Noctuidae. It is found in Tasmania and Victoria.
