= Proteuxoa marginalis =

Scientific classification
- Kingdom: Animalia
- Phylum: Arthropoda
- Class: Insecta
- Order: Lepidoptera
- Superfamily: Noctuoidea
- Family: Noctuidae
- Genus: Proteuxoa
- Species: P. marginalis

Binomial name
- Proteuxoa marginalis (Walker, 1865)

Synonyms
- Hadena marginalis Walker, 1865; Nitocris exundans Guenée, 1868; Euplexia mamestroides Walker, 1869

Species of moth

Proteuxoa marginalis is a moth of the family Noctuidae. It is found in the Australian Capital Territory, New South Wales and Tasmania.
