= Proteuxoa passalota =

Scientific classification
- Kingdom: Animalia
- Phylum: Arthropoda
- Class: Insecta
- Order: Lepidoptera
- Superfamily: Noctuoidea
- Family: Noctuidae
- Genus: Proteuxoa
- Species: P. passalota

Binomial name
- Proteuxoa passalota (Hampson, 1909)

Synonyms
- Omphaletis passalota Hampson, 1909; Prometopus passalota Turner, 1909

Species of moth

Proteuxoa passalota is a moth of the family Noctuidae. It is found in New South Wales, South Australia, Victoria and Western Australia.
