= Proteuxoa scotti =

Scientific classification
- Domain: Eukaryota
- Kingdom: Animalia
- Phylum: Arthropoda
- Class: Insecta
- Order: Lepidoptera
- Superfamily: Noctuoidea
- Family: Noctuidae
- Genus: Proteuxoa
- Species: P. scotti

Binomial name
- Proteuxoa scotti (Felder & Rogenhofer, 1874)

Synonyms
- Agrotis scotti Felder & Rogenhofer, 1874

Species of moth

Proteuxoa scotti is a moth of the family Noctuidae. It is found in Tasmania.
