= Proteuxoa heliosema =

Scientific classification
- Domain: Eukaryota
- Kingdom: Animalia
- Phylum: Arthropoda
- Class: Insecta
- Order: Lepidoptera
- Superfamily: Noctuoidea
- Family: Noctuidae
- Genus: Proteuxoa
- Species: P. heliosema

Binomial name
- Proteuxoa heliosema (Lower, 1902)

Synonyms
- Prometopus heliosema Lower, 1902

Species of moth

Proteuxoa heliosema is a moth of the family Noctuidae. It is found in the Australian Capital Territory, New South Wales, Queensland, South Australia, Victoria and Western Australia.

Larvae have been recorded feeding on Eucalyptus species, as well as Pennisetum clandestinum and various other grasses.
