= Proteuxoa amaurodes =

Scientific classification
- Domain: Eukaryota
- Kingdom: Animalia
- Phylum: Arthropoda
- Class: Insecta
- Order: Lepidoptera
- Superfamily: Noctuoidea
- Family: Noctuidae
- Genus: Proteuxoa
- Species: P. amaurodes

Binomial name
- Proteuxoa amaurodes (Lower, 1902)

Synonyms
- Agrotis amaurodes Lower, 1902; Proteuxoa antaurodes Hampson, 1903; Ariathisa ochropolia Turner, 1943

Species of moth

Proteuxoa amaurodes is a moth of the family Noctuidae. It is found in South Australia, Tasmania and Victoria.
