= Proteuxoa cryphaea =

Scientific classification
- Domain: Eukaryota
- Kingdom: Animalia
- Phylum: Arthropoda
- Class: Insecta
- Order: Lepidoptera
- Superfamily: Noctuoidea
- Family: Noctuidae
- Genus: Proteuxoa
- Species: P. cryphaea

Binomial name
- Proteuxoa cryphaea (Turner, 1908)

Synonyms
- Caradrina cryphaea Turner, 1908

Species of moth

Proteuxoa cryphaea is a moth of the family Noctuidae. It is found in New South Wales and Victoria.
