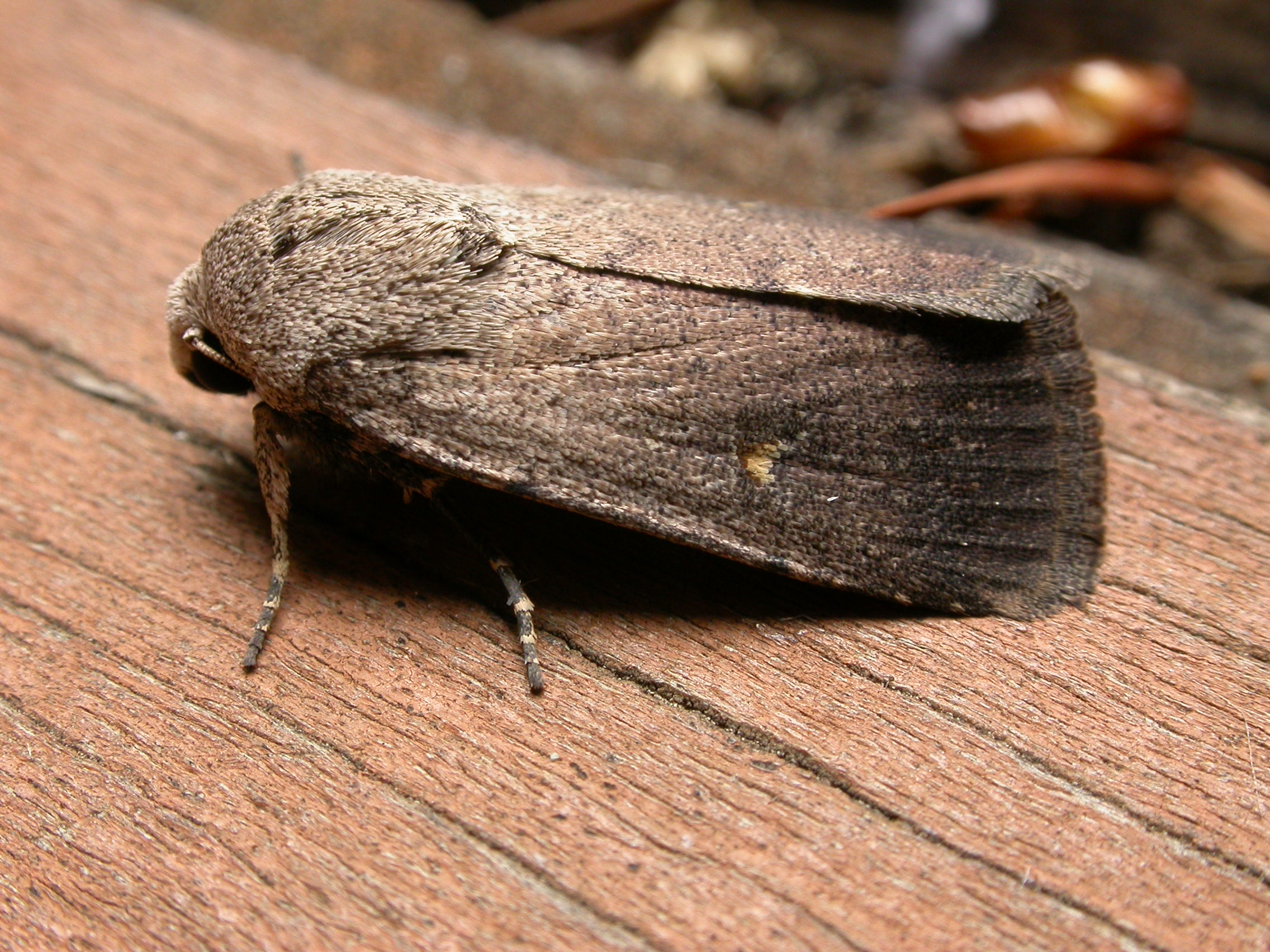
- Proteuxoa tibiata

Scientific classification
- Kingdom: Animalia
- Phylum: Arthropoda
- Class: Insecta
- Order: Lepidoptera
- Superfamily: Noctuoidea
- Family: Noctuidae
- Subfamily: Noctuinae
- Genus: Proteuxoa; Hampson, 1903

Synonyms
- Nitocris Guenée, 1868; Omphaletis (Acronyctinae) Hampson, 1908; Micropia (Acronyctinaa) Hampson, 1908; Peripyra (Acronyctinae) Hampson, 1908; Micropia (Acronyctinae) Hampson, 1909; Omphaletis (Acronyctinae) Hampson, 1908; Gyroprora Turner, 1911; Androdes Turner, 1920; Dinoprora Turner, 1920; Thoracolopha Turner, 1939; Pricomia Nye, 1975; Rictonis Nye, 1975

= Proteuxoa =

Genus of moths

Proteuxoa is a genus of moths of the family Noctuidae. The genus was erected by George Hampson in 1903.

== Species ==
- Proteuxoa acontoura (Lower, 1915)
- Proteuxoa adelopa (Hampson, 1909)
- Proteuxoa adelphodes (Lower, 1902)
- Proteuxoa amaurodes (Lower, 1902)
- Proteuxoa angasi (Felder & Rogenhofer, 1874)
- Proteuxoa argonephra (Turner, 1931)
- Proteuxoa asbolaea (Turner, 1931)
- Proteuxoa atmoscopa (Lower, 1902)
- Proteuxoa atra (Guenée, 1852)
- Proteuxoa atrisquamata (Lower, 1902)
- Proteuxoa bistrigula (Walker, 1857)
- Proteuxoa callimera (Lower, 1897)
- Proteuxoa capularis (Guenée, 1852)
- Proteuxoa chrysospila (Lower, 1902)
- Proteuxoa cinereicollis (Guenée, 1852)
- Proteuxoa coelenoptera (Lower, 1915)
- Proteuxoa comma (Walker, 1856)
- Proteuxoa confinis (Walker, 1857)
- Proteuxoa cornuta (Lower, 1902)
- Proteuxoa cryphaea (Turner, 1908)
- Proteuxoa crypsicharis (Lower, 1902)
- Proteuxoa cyanoloma (Lower, 1902)
- Proteuxoa desertorum (Turner, 1944)
- Proteuxoa ebenodes (Turner, 1911)
- Proteuxoa epiplecta (Guenée, 1868)
- Proteuxoa euchroa (Lower, 1902)
- Proteuxoa eupolia (Turner, 1936)
- Proteuxoa flexirena (Walker, 1865)
- Proteuxoa florescens (Walker, [1857])
- Proteuxoa goniographa (Turner, 1943)
- Proteuxoa gypsina (Lower, 1897)
- Proteuxoa heliosema (Lower, 1902)
- Proteuxoa heterogama (Hampson, 1909)
- Proteuxoa hydraecioides (Guenée, 1852)
- Proteuxoa hypochalchis (Turner, 1902)
- Proteuxoa imparata (Walker, 1857)
- Proteuxoa instipata (Walker, [1857])
- Proteuxoa interferens (Walker, 1857)
- Proteuxoa leptochroa (Turner, 1925)
- Proteuxoa leucosticta (Turner, 1908)
- Proteuxoa marginalis (Walker, 1865)
- Proteuxoa melanographa (Turner, 1908)
- Proteuxoa melodora (Lower, 1902)
- Proteuxoa mesombra (Lower, 1893)
- Proteuxoa metableta (Turner, 1939)
- Proteuxoa metaneura (Lower, 1908)
- Proteuxoa microdes (Lower, 1902)
- Proteuxoa microspila (Lower, 1902)
- Proteuxoa monochroa (Lower, 1902)
- Proteuxoa nuna (Guenée, 1868)
- Proteuxoa nyctereutica (Turner, 1941)
- Proteuxoa nycteris (Turner, 1908)
- Proteuxoa nyctimesa (Hampson, 1911)
- Proteuxoa ochrias (Turner, 1911)
- Proteuxoa oxygona (Lower, 1902)
- Proteuxoa paragypsa (Lower, 1902)
- Proteuxoa paratorna (Lower, 1902)
- Proteuxoa passalota (Hampson, 1909)
- Proteuxoa petrodora (Lower, 1902)
- Proteuxoa pissonephra (Turner, 1939)
- Proteuxoa plaesiospila (Turner, 1939)
- Proteuxoa poliocrossa (Turner, 1903)
- Proteuxoa porphyrescens (Lower, 1902)
- Proteuxoa restituta (Guenée, 1852)
- Proteuxoa rhodocentra (Lower, 1902)
- Proteuxoa rubripuncta (Turner, 1933)
- Proteuxoa rufimaculis (Turner, 1943)
- Proteuxoa sanguinipuncta (Guenée, 1852)
- Proteuxoa sarcomorpha (Lower, 1902)
- Proteuxoa scotti (Felder & Rogenhofer, 1874)
- Proteuxoa senta (Lower, 1902)
- Proteuxoa spilocrossa (Turner, 1915)
- Proteuxoa spodias Turner, 1908
- Proteuxoa testaceicollis (Guenée, 1852)
- Proteuxoa tetronycha (Hoare, 2017)
- Proteuxoa tibiata (Guenée, 1852)
- Proteuxoa tortisigna (Walker, [1857])
- Proteuxoa typhlopa (Lower, 1900)
- Proteuxoa verecunda (Walker, 1858)
