= Proteuxoa goniographa =

Scientific classification
- Domain: Eukaryota
- Kingdom: Animalia
- Phylum: Arthropoda
- Class: Insecta
- Order: Lepidoptera
- Superfamily: Noctuoidea
- Family: Noctuidae
- Genus: Proteuxoa
- Species: P. goniographa

Binomial name
- Proteuxoa goniographa (Turner, 1943)

Synonyms
- Ariathisa goniographa Turner, 1943

Species of moth

Proteuxoa goniographa is a moth of the family Noctuidae. It is found in Queensland.
