= Proteuxoa atrisquamata =

Scientific classification
- Domain: Eukaryota
- Kingdom: Animalia
- Phylum: Arthropoda
- Class: Insecta
- Order: Lepidoptera
- Superfamily: Noctuoidea
- Family: Noctuidae
- Genus: Proteuxoa
- Species: P. atrisquamata

Binomial name
- Proteuxoa atrisquamata (Lower, 1902)

Synonyms
- Caradrina atrisquamata Lower, 1902; Thoracolopha alychnodes Turner, 1939

Species of moth

Proteuxoa atrisquamata is a moth of the family Noctuidae. It is found in Queensland and Victoria.
