= Proteuxoa callimera =

Scientific classification
- Domain: Eukaryota
- Kingdom: Animalia
- Phylum: Arthropoda
- Class: Insecta
- Order: Lepidoptera
- Superfamily: Noctuoidea
- Family: Noctuidae
- Genus: Proteuxoa
- Species: P. callimera

Binomial name
- Proteuxoa callimera (Lower, 1897)

Synonyms
- Agrotis callimera Lower, 1897; Ariathisa chionopasta Hampson, 1909

Species of moth

Proteuxoa callimera is a moth of the family Noctuidae. It is found in South Australia and Western Australia.

Larvae have been recorded feeding on Chenopodiaceae and possibly Poaceae species under the cover of sand in white sand dunes.
