= Proteuxoa desertorum =

Scientific classification
- Domain: Eukaryota
- Kingdom: Animalia
- Phylum: Arthropoda
- Class: Insecta
- Order: Lepidoptera
- Superfamily: Noctuoidea
- Family: Noctuidae
- Genus: Proteuxoa
- Species: P. desertorum

Binomial name
- Proteuxoa desertorum (Turner, 1944)

Synonyms
- Ariathisa desertorum Turner, 1944

Species of moth

Proteuxoa desertorum is a moth of the family Noctuidae. It is found in South Australia.
