= Proteuxoa metableta =

Scientific classification
- Domain: Eukaryota
- Kingdom: Animalia
- Phylum: Arthropoda
- Class: Insecta
- Order: Lepidoptera
- Superfamily: Noctuoidea
- Family: Noctuidae
- Genus: Proteuxoa
- Species: P. metableta

Binomial name
- Proteuxoa metableta (Turner, 1939)

Synonyms
- Caradrina metableta Turner, 1939

Species of moth

Proteuxoa metableta is a moth of the family Noctuidae. It is found in the Australian Capital Territory, New South Wales, Queensland and Tasmania.
