= Proteuxoa instipata =

Scientific classification
- Kingdom: Animalia
- Phylum: Arthropoda
- Class: Insecta
- Order: Lepidoptera
- Superfamily: Noctuoidea
- Family: Noctuidae
- Genus: Proteuxoa
- Species: P. instipata

Binomial name
- Proteuxoa instipata (Walker, [1857])

Synonyms
- Graphiphora instipata Walker, 1857; Hadena congregata Walker, 1857

Species of moth

Proteuxoa instipata is a moth of the family Noctuidae. It is found in Tasmania.
