= Proteuxoa ebenodes =

Scientific classification
- Domain: Eukaryota
- Kingdom: Animalia
- Phylum: Arthropoda
- Class: Insecta
- Order: Lepidoptera
- Superfamily: Noctuoidea
- Family: Noctuidae
- Genus: Proteuxoa
- Species: P. ebenodes

Binomial name
- Proteuxoa ebenodes (Turner, 1911)

Synonyms
- Ariathisa ebenodes Turner, 1911

Species of moth

Proteuxoa ebenodes is a moth of the family Noctuidae. It is found in Western Australia.
