= Proteuxoa pissonephra =

Scientific classification
- Domain: Eukaryota
- Kingdom: Animalia
- Phylum: Arthropoda
- Class: Insecta
- Order: Lepidoptera
- Superfamily: Noctuoidea
- Family: Noctuidae
- Genus: Proteuxoa
- Species: P. pissonephra

Binomial name
- Proteuxoa pissonephra (Turner, 1939)

Synonyms
- Thoracolopha pissonephra Turner, 1939

Species of moth

Proteuxoa pissonephra is a moth of the family Noctuidae. It is found in South Australia and Western Australia.
