= Proteuxoa ochrias =

Scientific classification
- Domain: Eukaryota
- Kingdom: Animalia
- Phylum: Arthropoda
- Class: Insecta
- Order: Lepidoptera
- Superfamily: Noctuoidea
- Family: Noctuidae
- Genus: Proteuxoa
- Species: P. ochrias

Binomial name
- Proteuxoa ochrias (Turner, 1911)

Synonyms
- Gyroprora ochrias Turner, 1911

Species of moth

Proteuxoa ochrias is a moth of the family Noctuidae. It is found in Victoria, Australia.
