= Proteuxoa typhlopa =

Scientific classification
- Domain: Eukaryota
- Kingdom: Animalia
- Phylum: Arthropoda
- Class: Insecta
- Order: Lepidoptera
- Superfamily: Noctuoidea
- Family: Noctuidae
- Genus: Proteuxoa
- Species: P. typhlopa

Binomial name
- Proteuxoa typhlopa (Lower, 1900)

Synonyms
- Orthosia typhlopa Lower, 1900

Species of moth

Proteuxoa typhlopa is a moth of the family Noctuidae. It is found in South Australia.
