= Proteuxoa imparata =

Scientific classification
- Kingdom: Animalia
- Phylum: Arthropoda
- Class: Insecta
- Order: Lepidoptera
- Superfamily: Noctuoidea
- Family: Noctuidae
- Genus: Proteuxoa
- Species: P. imparata

Binomial name
- Proteuxoa imparata (Walker, 1857)

Synonyms
- Celaena imparata Walker, 1857

Species of moth

Proteuxoa imparata is a moth of the family Noctuidae. It is found in the Australian Capital Territory, New South Wales and Tasmania.
