= Proteuxoa asbolaea =

Scientific classification
- Domain: Eukaryota
- Kingdom: Animalia
- Phylum: Arthropoda
- Class: Insecta
- Order: Lepidoptera
- Superfamily: Noctuoidea
- Family: Noctuidae
- Genus: Proteuxoa
- Species: P. asbolaea

Binomial name
- Proteuxoa asbolaea (Turner, 1931)

Synonyms
- Caradrina asbolaea Turner, 1931

Species of moth

Proteuxoa asbolaea is a moth of the family Noctuidae. It is found in New South Wales, South Australia, Victoria and Western Australia.
