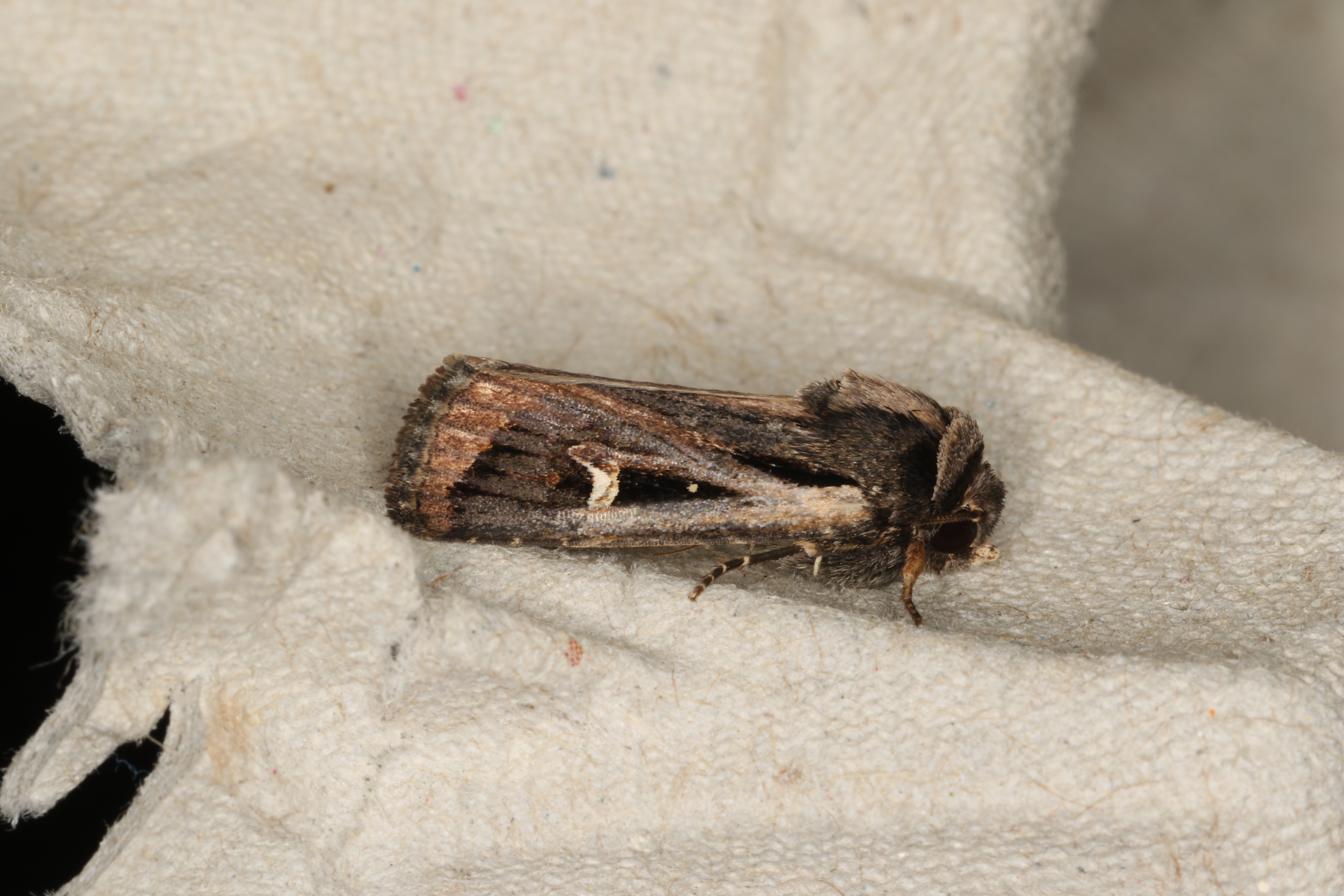

Scientific classification
- Kingdom: Animalia
- Phylum: Arthropoda
- Class: Insecta
- Order: Lepidoptera
- Superfamily: Noctuoidea
- Family: Noctuidae
- Genus: Proteuxoa
- Species: P. epiplecta

Binomial name
- Proteuxoa epiplecta (Guenée, 1868)

Synonyms
- Nitocris epiplecta Guenée, 1868

= Proteuxoa epiplecta =

Species of moth

Proteuxoa epiplecta is a moth of the family Noctuidae. It is found in Western Australia.
