= Proteuxoa mesombra =

Scientific classification
- Domain: Eukaryota
- Kingdom: Animalia
- Phylum: Arthropoda
- Class: Insecta
- Order: Lepidoptera
- Superfamily: Noctuoidea
- Family: Noctuidae
- Genus: Proteuxoa
- Species: P. mesombra

Binomial name
- Proteuxoa mesombra (Lower, 1893)

Synonyms
- Orthosia mesombra Lower, 1893

Species of moth

Proteuxoa mesombra is a moth of the family Noctuidae. It is found in South Australia.
