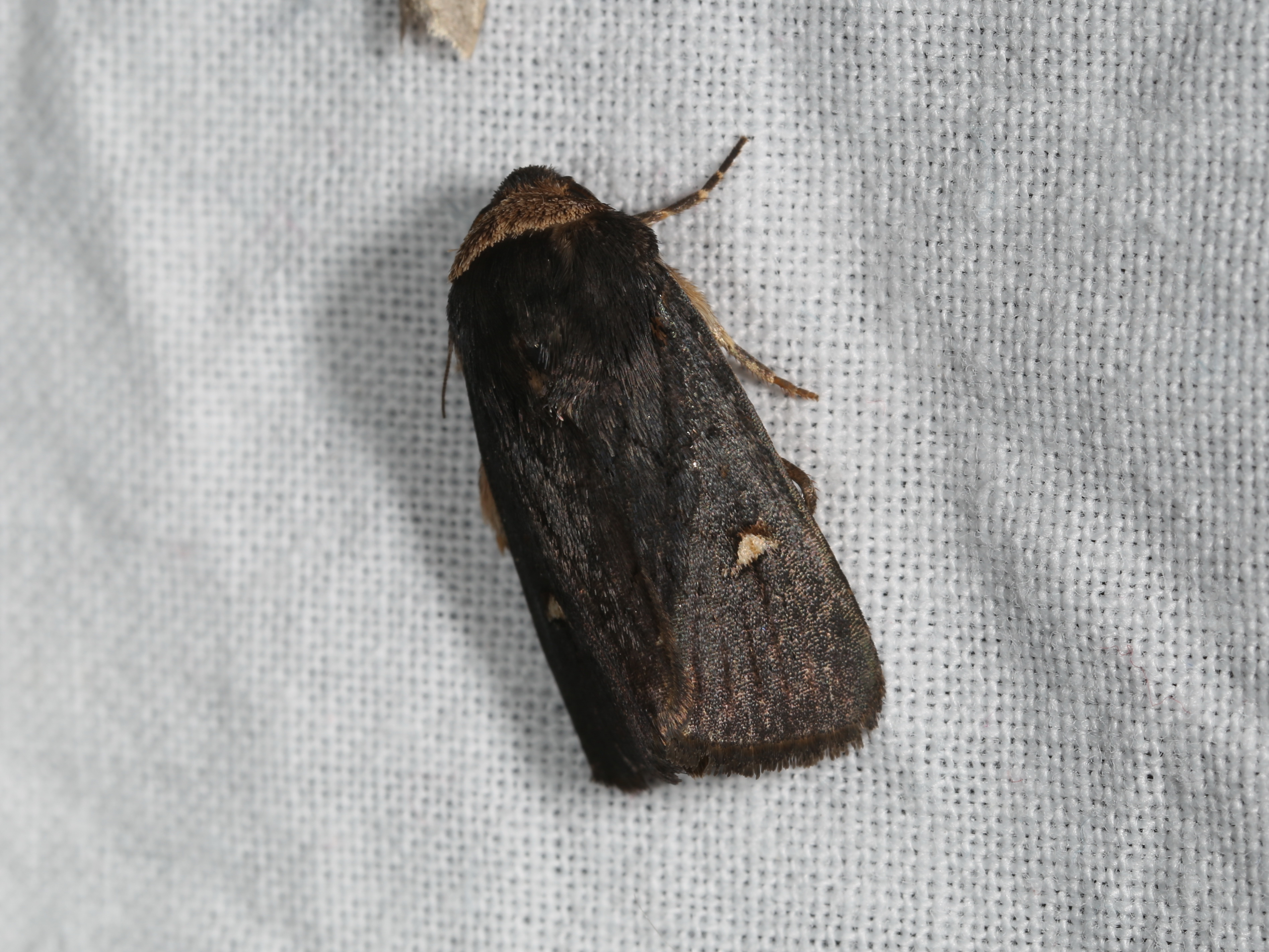

Scientific classification
- Kingdom: Animalia
- Phylum: Arthropoda
- Class: Insecta
- Order: Lepidoptera
- Superfamily: Noctuoidea
- Family: Noctuidae
- Genus: Proteuxoa
- Species: P. testaceicollis

Binomial name
- Proteuxoa testaceicollis (Guenée, 1852)

Synonyms
- Agrotis testaceicollis Guenée, 1852; Xylina collaris Walker, 1865

= Proteuxoa testaceicollis =

Species of moth

Proteuxoa testaceicollis is a moth of the family Noctuidae. It is found in the Australian Capital Territory, New South Wales and Queensland.
