= Proteuxoa argonephra =

Scientific classification
- Domain: Eukaryota
- Kingdom: Animalia
- Phylum: Arthropoda
- Class: Insecta
- Order: Lepidoptera
- Superfamily: Noctuoidea
- Family: Noctuidae
- Genus: Proteuxoa
- Species: P. argonephra

Binomial name
- Proteuxoa argonephra (Turner, 1931)

Synonyms
- Caradrina argonephra Turner, 1931

Species of moth

Proteuxoa argonephra is a moth of the family Noctuidae. It is found in Western Australia.
