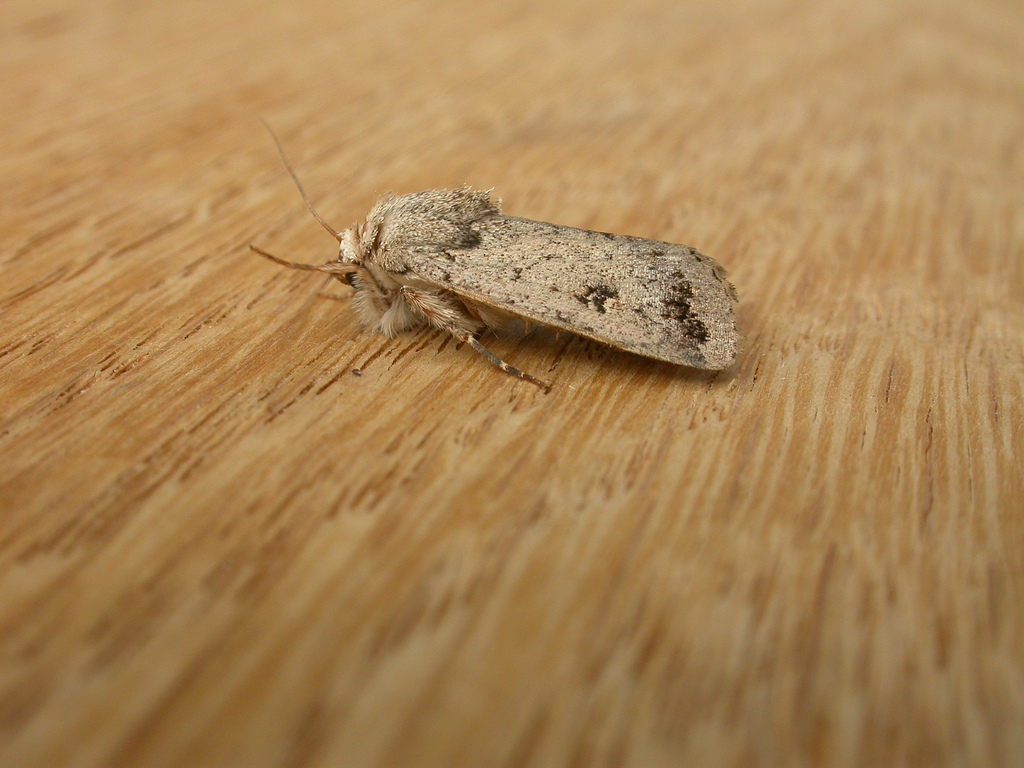

Scientific classification
- Kingdom: Animalia
- Phylum: Arthropoda
- Class: Insecta
- Order: Lepidoptera
- Superfamily: Noctuoidea
- Family: Noctuidae
- Genus: Proteuxoa
- Species: P. capularis

Binomial name
- Proteuxoa capularis (Guenée, 1852)

Synonyms
- Agrotis capularis Guenée, 1852; Mamestra ignobilis Walker, 1856; Orthosia lunifera Walker, 1857; Amphipyra cinctipes Felder, & Rogenhofer, 1874; Caradrina derosa Morrison, 1875

= Proteuxoa capularis =

Species of moth

Proteuxoa capularis is a moth of the family Noctuidae. It is found in the Australian Capital Territory, New South Wales, Queensland, South Australia, Tasmania and Victoria.
