= Proteuxoa melodora =

Scientific classification
- Domain: Eukaryota
- Kingdom: Animalia
- Phylum: Arthropoda
- Class: Insecta
- Order: Lepidoptera
- Superfamily: Noctuoidea
- Family: Noctuidae
- Genus: Proteuxoa
- Species: P. melodora

Binomial name
- Proteuxoa melodora (Lower, 1902)

Synonyms
- Prometopus melodora Lower, 1902; Prometopus malacopis Lower, 1902; Ariathisa celaenica Turner, 1911; Dinoprora stalidosema Turner, 1931

Species of moth

Proteuxoa melodora is a moth of the family Noctuidae. It is found in New South Wales, South Australia, Victoria and Western Australia.
