= Proteuxoa leptochroa =

Scientific classification
- Domain: Eukaryota
- Kingdom: Animalia
- Phylum: Arthropoda
- Class: Insecta
- Order: Lepidoptera
- Superfamily: Noctuoidea
- Family: Noctuidae
- Genus: Proteuxoa
- Species: P. leptochroa

Binomial name
- Proteuxoa leptochroa (Turner, 1925)

Synonyms
- Caradrina leptochroa Turner, 1925

Species of moth

Proteuxoa leptochroa is a moth of the family Noctuidae. It is found in New South Wales.
