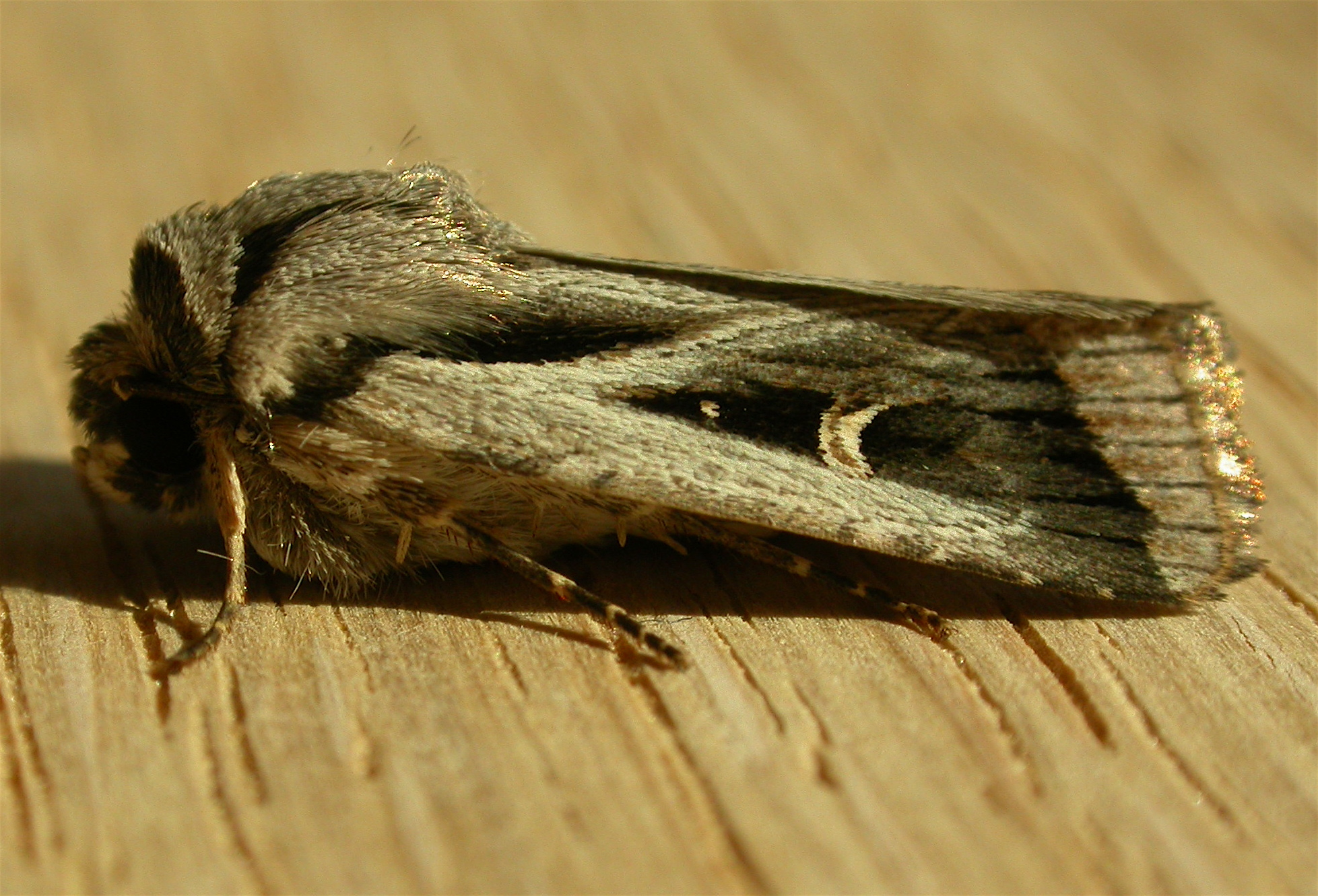

Scientific classification
- Domain: Eukaryota
- Kingdom: Animalia
- Phylum: Arthropoda
- Class: Insecta
- Order: Lepidoptera
- Superfamily: Noctuoidea
- Family: Noctuidae
- Genus: Proteuxoa
- Species: P. paragypsa

Binomial name
- Proteuxoa paragypsa Lower, 1902

Synonyms
- Caradrina paragypsa

= Proteuxoa paragypsa =

Species of moth

Proteuxoa paragypsa is a moth of the family Noctuidae. It is found in Australia, including Tasmania.
