= Proteuxoa eupolia =

Scientific classification
- Domain: Eukaryota
- Kingdom: Animalia
- Phylum: Arthropoda
- Class: Insecta
- Order: Lepidoptera
- Superfamily: Noctuoidea
- Family: Noctuidae
- Genus: Proteuxoa
- Species: P. eupolia

Binomial name
- Proteuxoa eupolia (Turner, 1936)

Synonyms
- Caradrina eupolia Turner, 1936

Species of moth

Proteuxoa eupolia is a moth of the family Noctuidae. It is found in the Australian Capital Territory, New South Wales and Queensland.
