= Proteuxoa rufimaculis =

Scientific classification
- Domain: Eukaryota
- Kingdom: Animalia
- Phylum: Arthropoda
- Class: Insecta
- Order: Lepidoptera
- Superfamily: Noctuoidea
- Family: Noctuidae
- Genus: Proteuxoa
- Species: P. rufimaculis

Binomial name
- Proteuxoa rufimaculis (Turner, 1943)

Synonyms
- Dinoprora rufimaculis Turner, 1943

Species of moth

Proteuxoa rufimaculis is a moth of the family Noctuidae. It is found in New South Wales, Queensland and South Australia.
