= Proteuxoa poliocrossa =

Scientific classification
- Domain: Eukaryota
- Kingdom: Animalia
- Phylum: Arthropoda
- Class: Insecta
- Order: Lepidoptera
- Superfamily: Noctuoidea
- Family: Noctuidae
- Genus: Proteuxoa
- Species: P. poliocrossa

Binomial name
- Proteuxoa poliocrossa (Turner, 1903)

Synonyms
- Caradrina poliocrossa Turner, 1903

Species of moth

Proteuxoa poliocrossa is a moth of the family Noctuidae. It is found in Western Australia.
