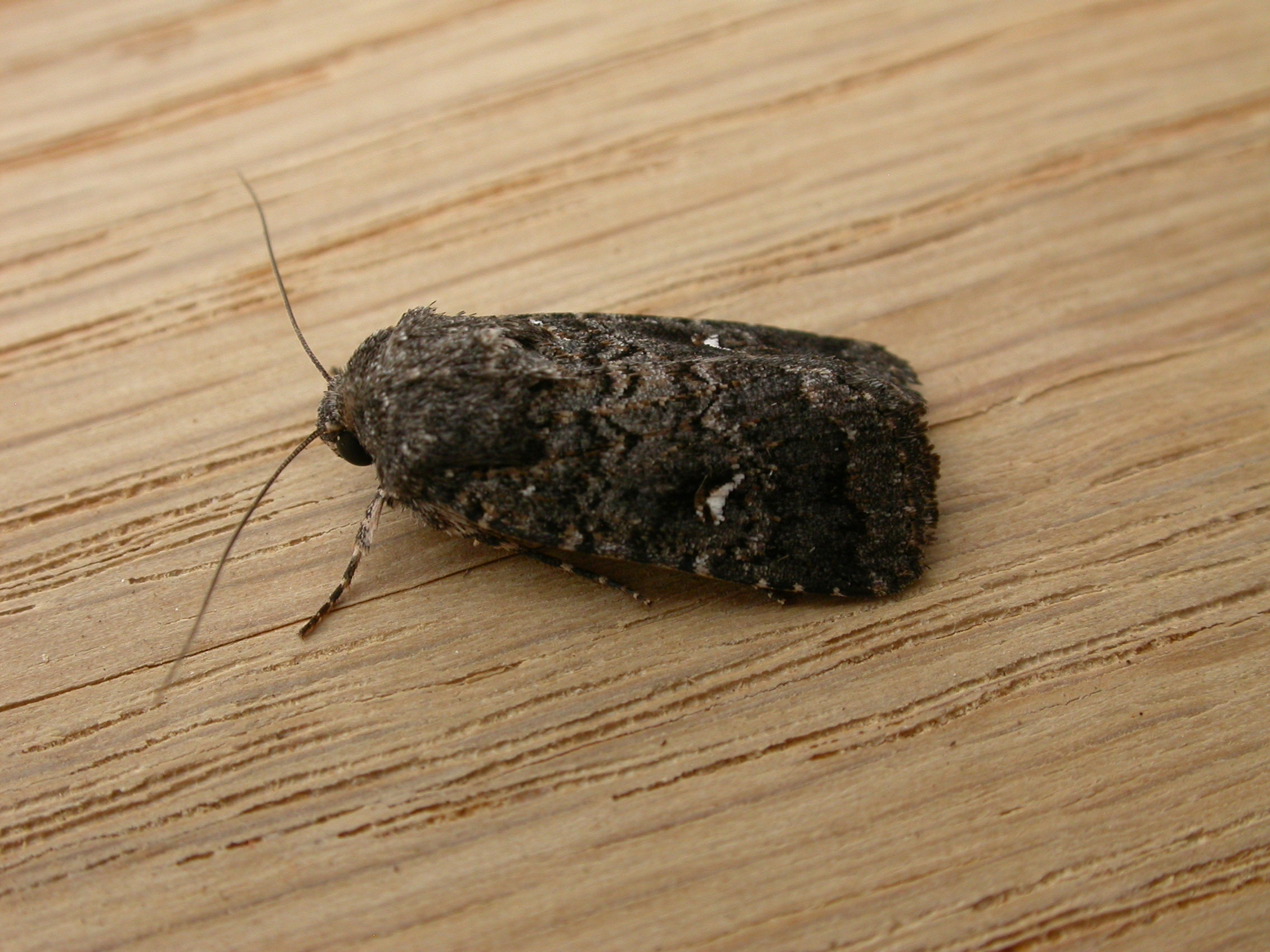

Scientific classification
- Kingdom: Animalia
- Phylum: Arthropoda
- Class: Insecta
- Order: Lepidoptera
- Superfamily: Noctuoidea
- Family: Noctuidae
- Genus: Proteuxoa
- Species: P. bistrigula

Binomial name
- Proteuxoa bistrigula Walker, 1857

Synonyms
- Hadena bistrigula; Proteuxoa loxosema; Ariathisa ophiosema

= Proteuxoa bistrigula =

Species of moth

Proteuxoa bistrigula is a moth of the family Noctuidae. It is found in the Australian Capital Territory, New South Wales, Victoria, Tasmania and South Australia.
