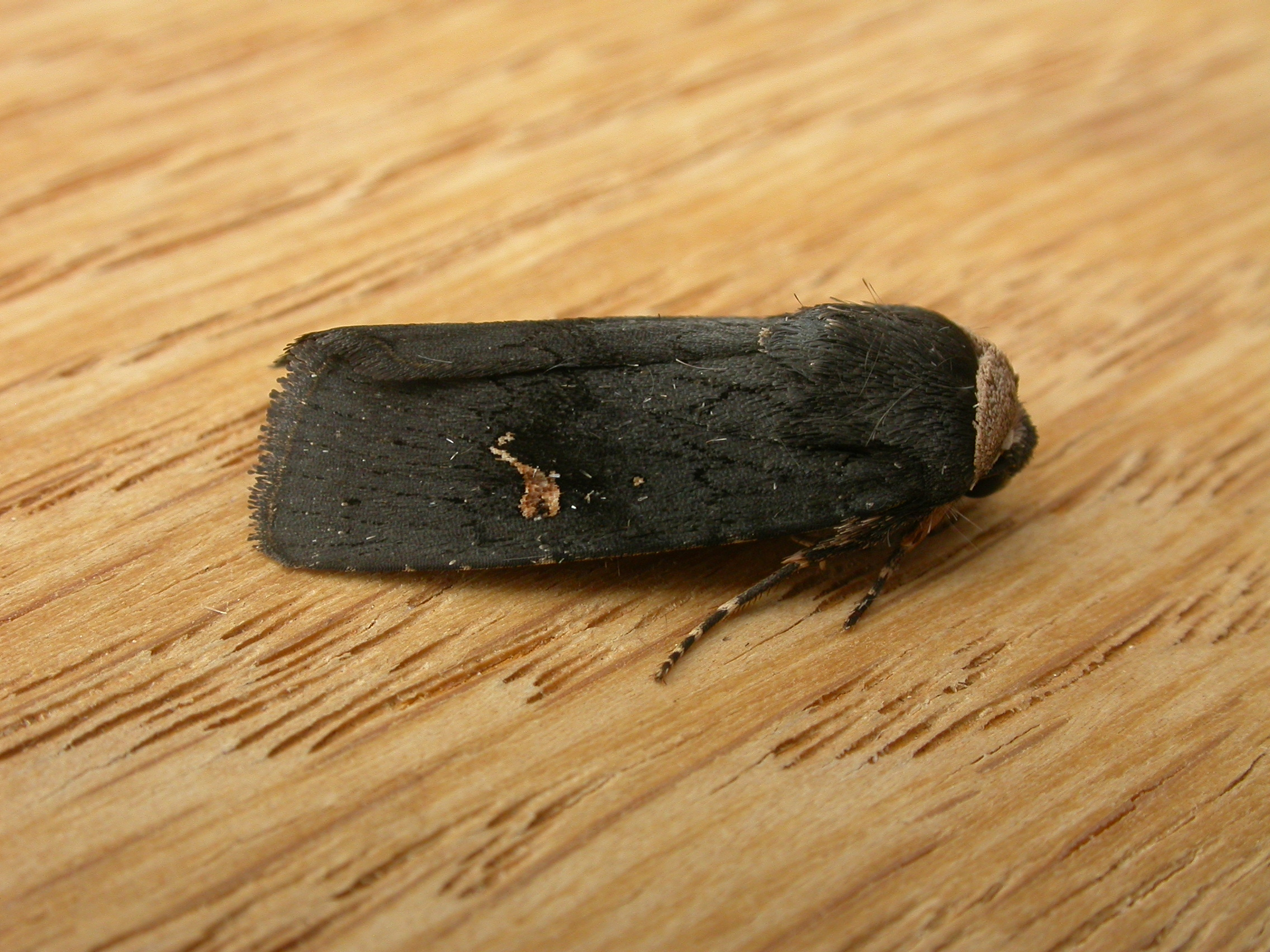

Scientific classification
- Kingdom: Animalia
- Phylum: Arthropoda
- Class: Insecta
- Order: Lepidoptera
- Superfamily: Noctuoidea
- Family: Noctuidae
- Genus: Proteuxoa
- Species: P. cinereicollis

Binomial name
- Proteuxoa cinereicollis (Guenée, 1852)

Synonyms
- Agrotis cinereicollis Guenée, 1852; Caradrina etoniana Lower, 1902

= Proteuxoa cinereicollis =

Species of moth

Proteuxoa cinereicollis is a moth of the family Noctuidae. It is found in the Australian Capital Territory, New South Wales, South Australia, Western Australia and Victoria.
