= Proteuxoa acontoura =

Scientific classification
- Domain: Eukaryota
- Kingdom: Animalia
- Phylum: Arthropoda
- Class: Insecta
- Order: Lepidoptera
- Superfamily: Noctuoidea
- Family: Noctuidae
- Genus: Proteuxoa
- Species: P. acontoura

Binomial name
- Proteuxoa acontoura (Lower, 1915)

Synonyms
- Omphaletis acontoura Lower, 1915

Species of moth

Proteuxoa acontoura is a moth of the family Noctuidae. It is found in New South Wales, South Australia and Western Australia.
