= Proteuxoa florescens =

Scientific classification
- Kingdom: Animalia
- Phylum: Arthropoda
- Class: Insecta
- Order: Lepidoptera
- Superfamily: Noctuoidea
- Family: Noctuidae
- Genus: Proteuxoa
- Species: P. florescens

Binomial name
- Proteuxoa florescens (Walker, [1857])

Synonyms
- Celaena florescens Walker, 1857; Miana lucasii Butler, 1882

Species of moth

Proteuxoa florescens is a moth of the family Noctuidae. It is found in the Australian Capital Territory, New South Wales, South Australia, Tasmania, Victoria and Western Australia.

The wingspan is about 40 mm.
