= Proteuxoa angasi =

Scientific classification
- Domain: Eukaryota
- Kingdom: Animalia
- Phylum: Arthropoda
- Class: Insecta
- Order: Lepidoptera
- Superfamily: Noctuoidea
- Family: Noctuidae
- Genus: Proteuxoa
- Species: P. angasi

Binomial name
- Proteuxoa angasi (Felder & Rogenhofer, 1874)

Synonyms
- Luperina angasi Felder & Rogenhofer, 1874; Prometopus endesma Lower, 1902

Species of moth

Proteuxoa angasi is a moth of the family Noctuidae. It is found in South Australia, New South Wales and Victoria.
