= Proteuxoa atmoscopa =

Scientific classification
- Domain: Eukaryota
- Kingdom: Animalia
- Phylum: Arthropoda
- Class: Insecta
- Order: Lepidoptera
- Superfamily: Noctuoidea
- Family: Noctuidae
- Genus: Proteuxoa
- Species: P. atmoscopa

Binomial name
- Proteuxoa atmoscopa (Lower, 1902)

Synonyms
- Caradrina atmoscopa Lower, 1902

Species of moth

Proteuxoa atmoscopa is a moth of the family Noctuidae. It is found in New South Wales, South Australia and Western Australia.
