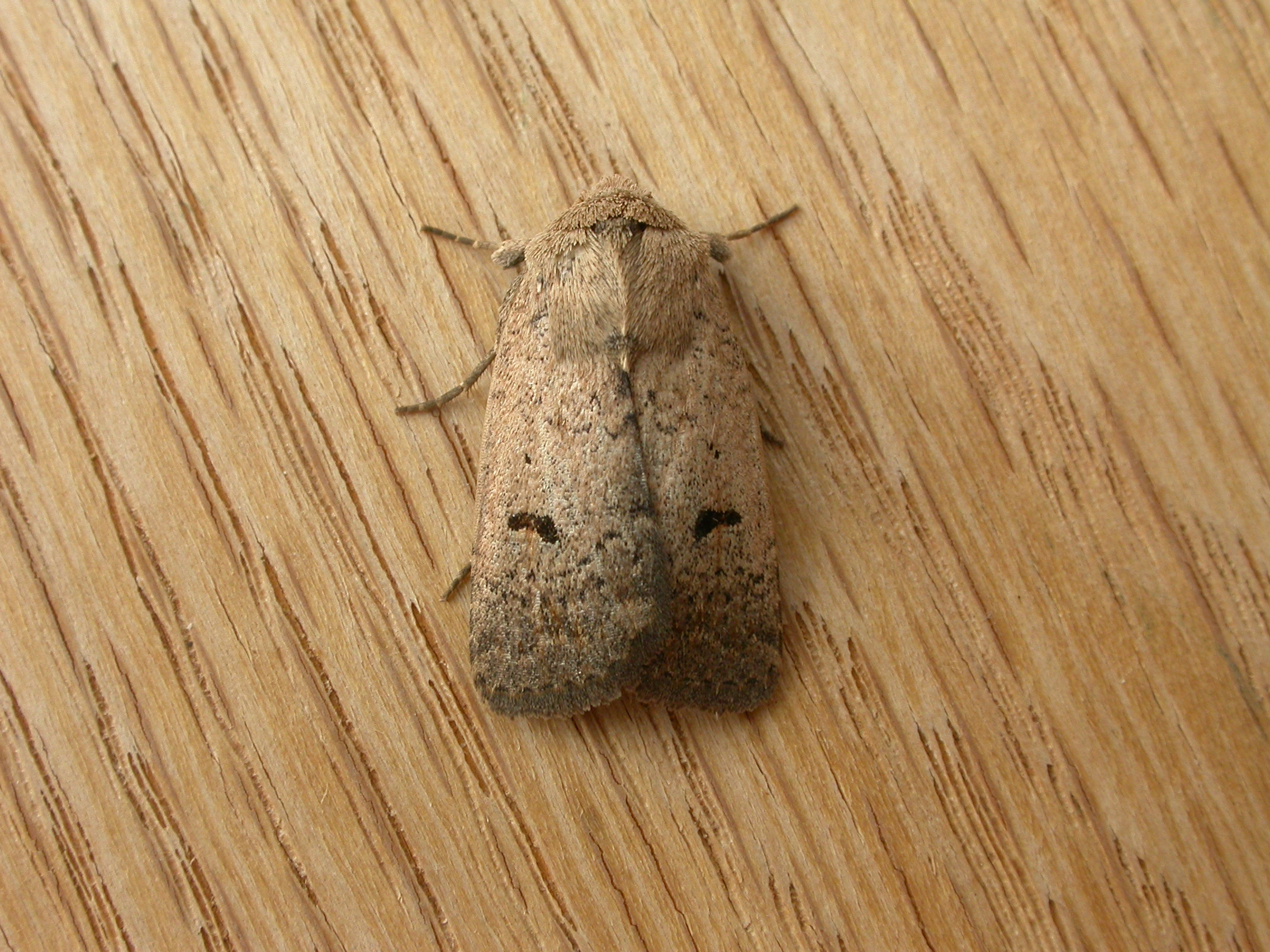

Scientific classification
- Domain: Eukaryota
- Kingdom: Animalia
- Phylum: Arthropoda
- Class: Insecta
- Order: Lepidoptera
- Superfamily: Noctuoidea
- Family: Noctuidae
- Genus: Proteuxoa
- Species: P. hypochalchis

Binomial name
- Proteuxoa hypochalchis (Turner, 1902)

Synonyms
- Agrotis hypochalchis Turner, 1902

= Proteuxoa hypochalchis =

Species of moth

Proteuxoa hypochalchis is a moth of the family Noctuidae. It is found in New South Wales and Queensland.

The larvae feed on Lobularia maritima.
