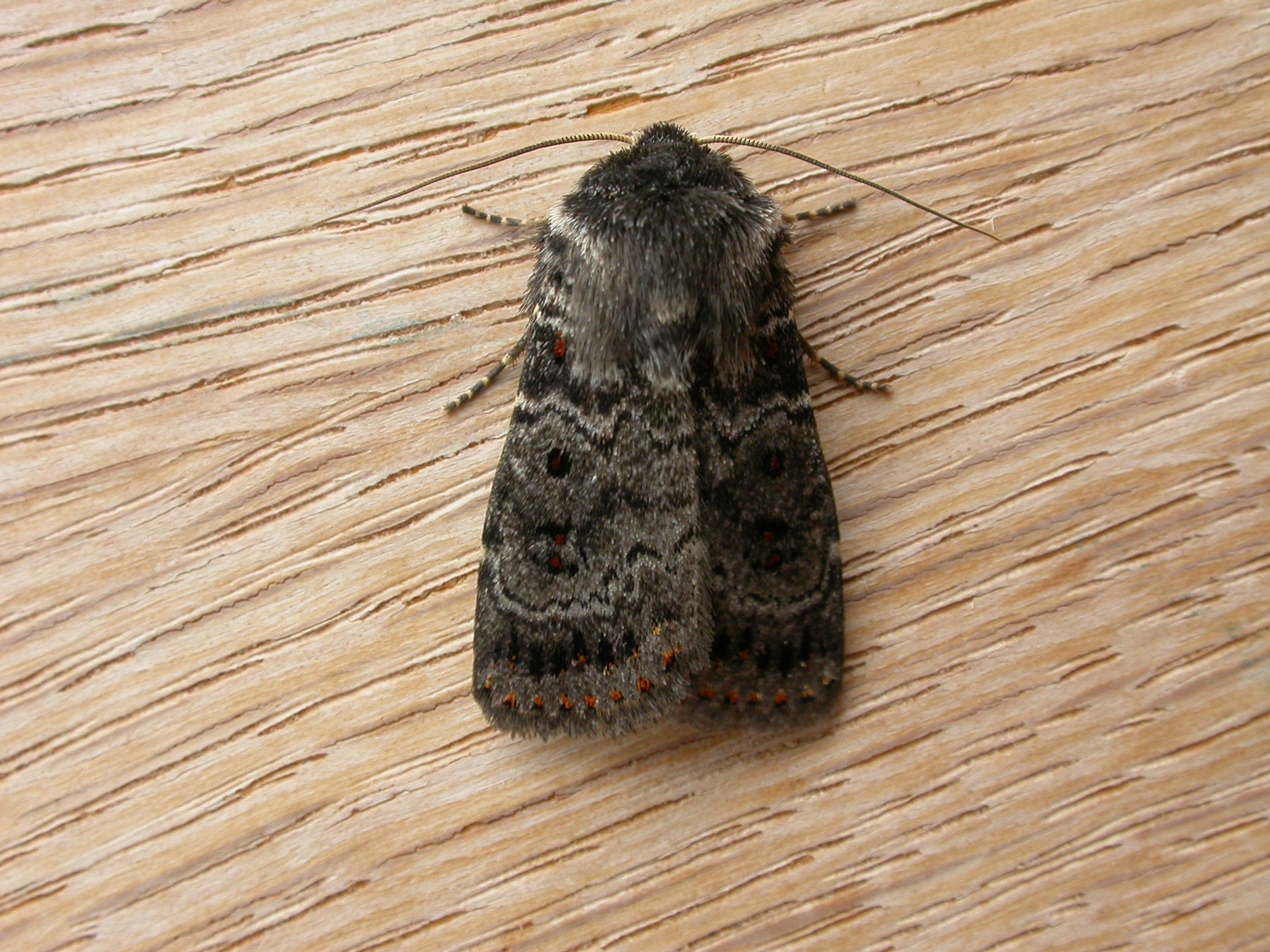

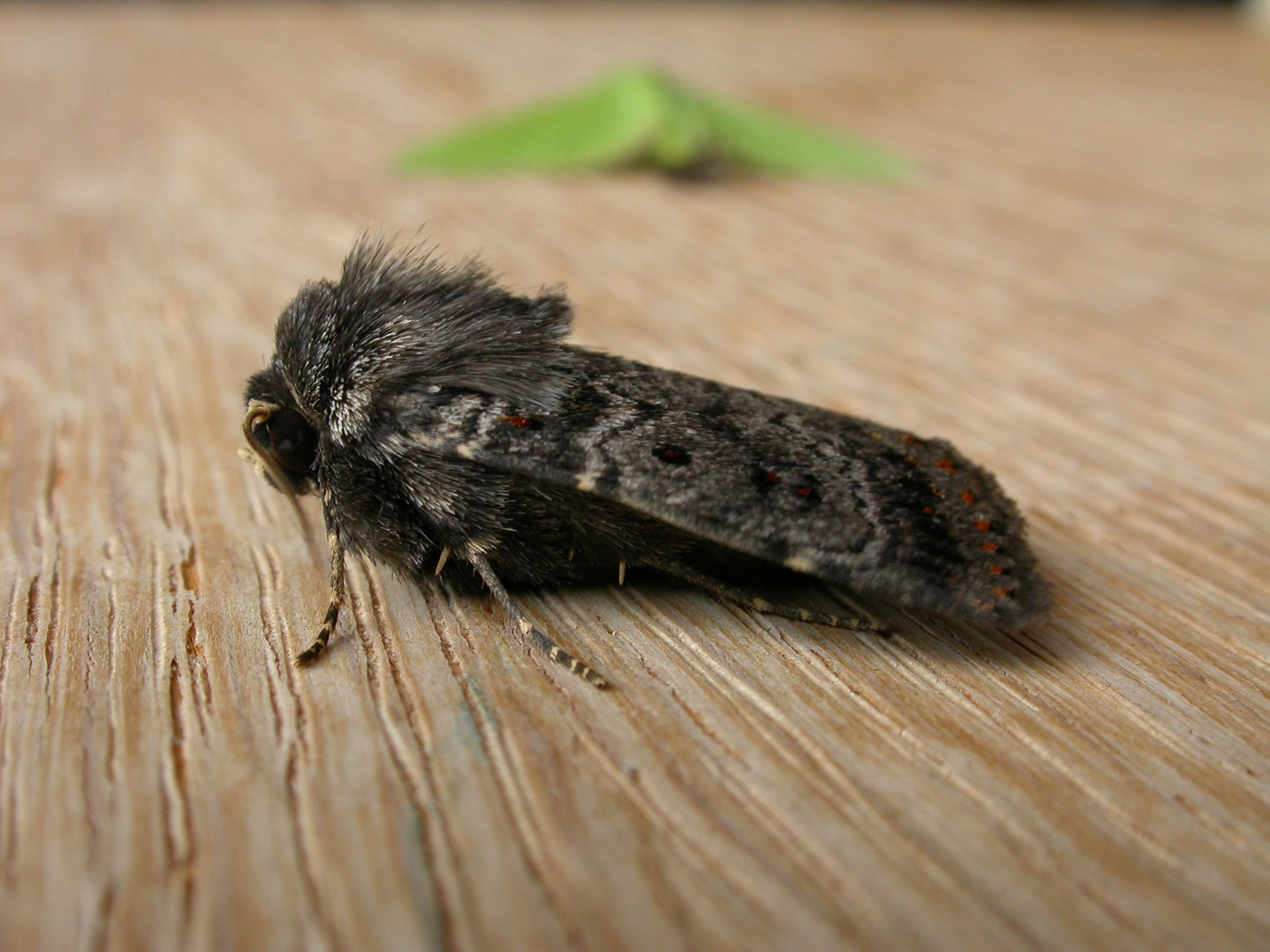

Scientific classification
- Domain: Eukaryota
- Kingdom: Animalia
- Phylum: Arthropoda
- Class: Insecta
- Order: Lepidoptera
- Superfamily: Noctuoidea
- Family: Noctuidae
- Genus: Proteuxoa
- Species: P. rubripuncta

Binomial name
- Proteuxoa rubripuncta (Turner, 1933)

Synonyms
- Amphopyra rubripuncta Turner, 1933

= Proteuxoa rubripuncta =

Species of moth

Proteuxoa rubripuncta is a moth of the family Noctuidae. It is found in the Australian Capital Territory, New South Wales, South Australia, Tasmania and Victoria.
