= Proteuxoa restituta =

Scientific classification
- Kingdom: Animalia
- Phylum: Arthropoda
- Class: Insecta
- Order: Lepidoptera
- Superfamily: Noctuoidea
- Family: Noctuidae
- Genus: Proteuxoa
- Species: P. restituta

Binomial name
- Proteuxoa restituta (Guenée, 1852)

Synonyms
- Agrotis restituta Guenée, 1852; Caradrina austera Turner, 1920

Species of moth

Proteuxoa restituta is a moth of the family Noctuidae. It is found in the Australian Capital Territory, New South Wales and Queensland.

The wingspan is about 40 mm.
