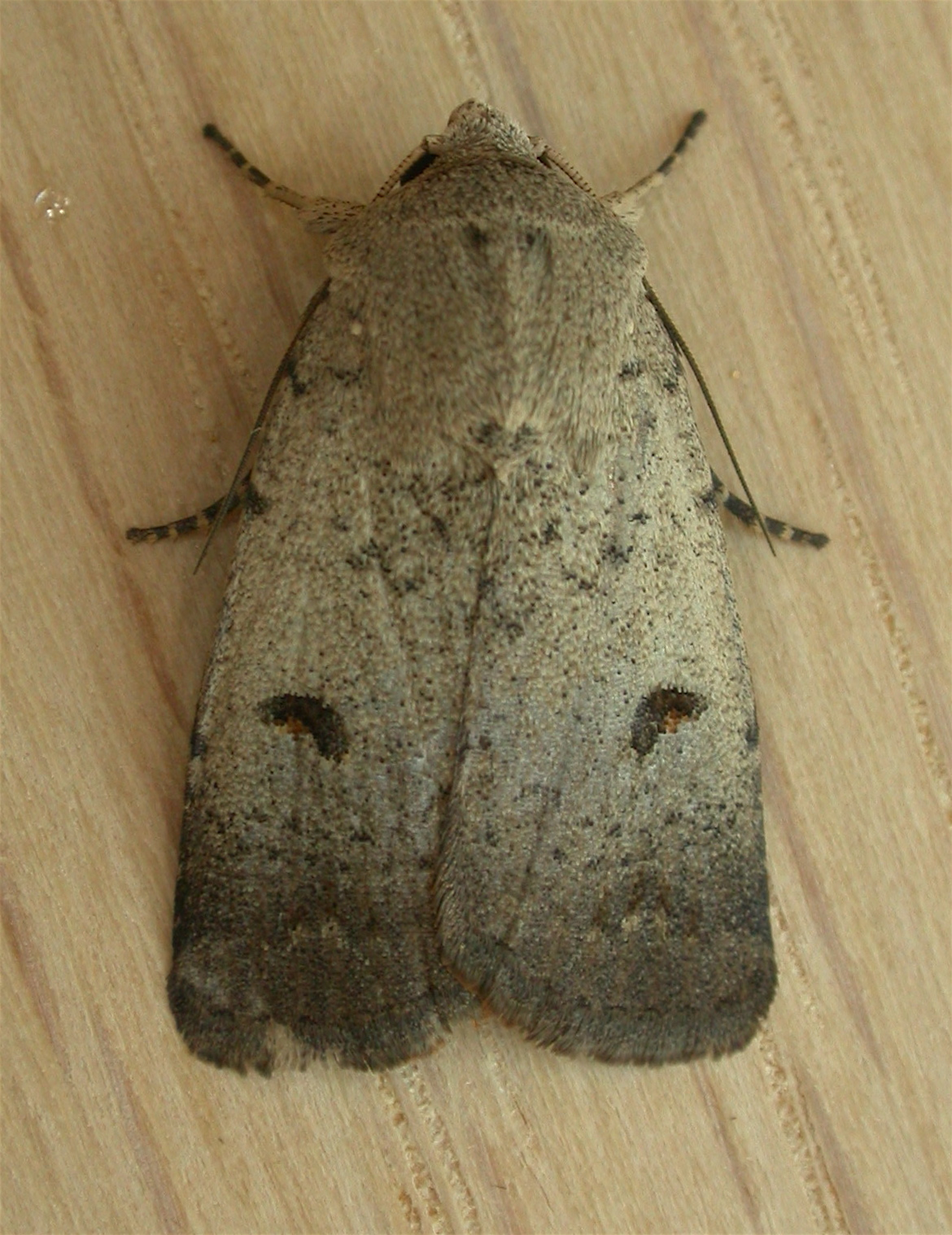

Scientific classification
- Kingdom: Animalia
- Phylum: Arthropoda
- Clade: Pancrustacea
- Class: Insecta
- Order: Lepidoptera
- Superfamily: Noctuoidea
- Family: Noctuidae
- Genus: Proteuxoa
- Species: P. tibiata

Binomial name
- Proteuxoa tibiata Guenée, 1852

= Proteuxoa tibiata =

Species of moth

Proteuxoa tibiata is a moth of the family Noctuidae. It is found in Australia, including Tasmania.
