= Proteuxoa adelopa =

Scientific classification
- Kingdom: Animalia
- Phylum: Arthropoda
- Class: Insecta
- Order: Lepidoptera
- Superfamily: Noctuoidea
- Family: Noctuidae
- Genus: Proteuxoa
- Species: P. adelopa

Binomial name
- Proteuxoa adelopa (Hampson, 1909)

Synonyms
- Ariathisa adelopa Hampson, 1909

Species of moth

Proteuxoa adelopa is a moth of the family Noctuidae. It is found in New South Wales and Victoria.

The moths of this species have a complex brown pattern on each foreskin, and plain pale brown hindwings with dark veins. The wingspan is about 4 cms.
