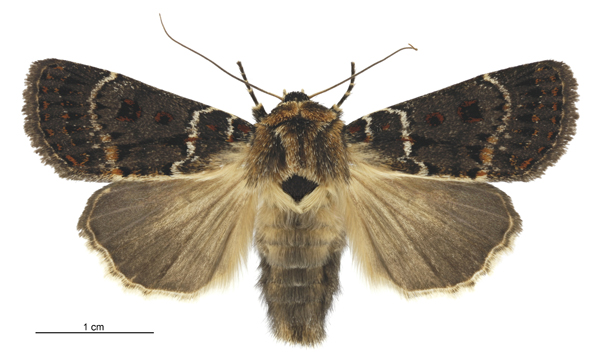
- Female
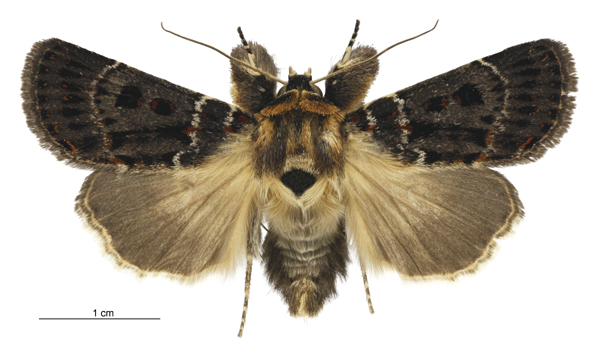
- Male

Scientific classification
- Kingdom: Animalia
- Phylum: Arthropoda
- Class: Insecta
- Order: Lepidoptera
- Superfamily: Noctuoidea
- Family: Noctuidae
- Genus: Proteuxoa
- Species: P. sanguinipuncta

Binomial name
- Proteuxoa sanguinipuncta (Guenée, 1852)

Synonyms
- Amphipyra sanguinipuncta Guenée, 1852; Mamestra trilineata Walker, 1865; Peripyra trilineata; (Walker, 1865)

= Proteuxoa sanguinipuncta =

Species of moth

Proteuxoa sanguinipuncta is a moth of the family Noctuidae. It is found in Queensland, New South Wales, Victoria, Tasmania, South Australia, and south Western Australia. It is also present in New Zealand where it was first recorded in 2007.

== Taxonomy ==
This species was first described by Achille Guenée in 1852 and named Amphipyra sanguinipuncta.

== Description ==
The wingspan is about 40 mm. This species is distinctive as its forewings are covered with crimson spots and is unlikely to be confused with any other species in New Zealand.

== Distribution ==
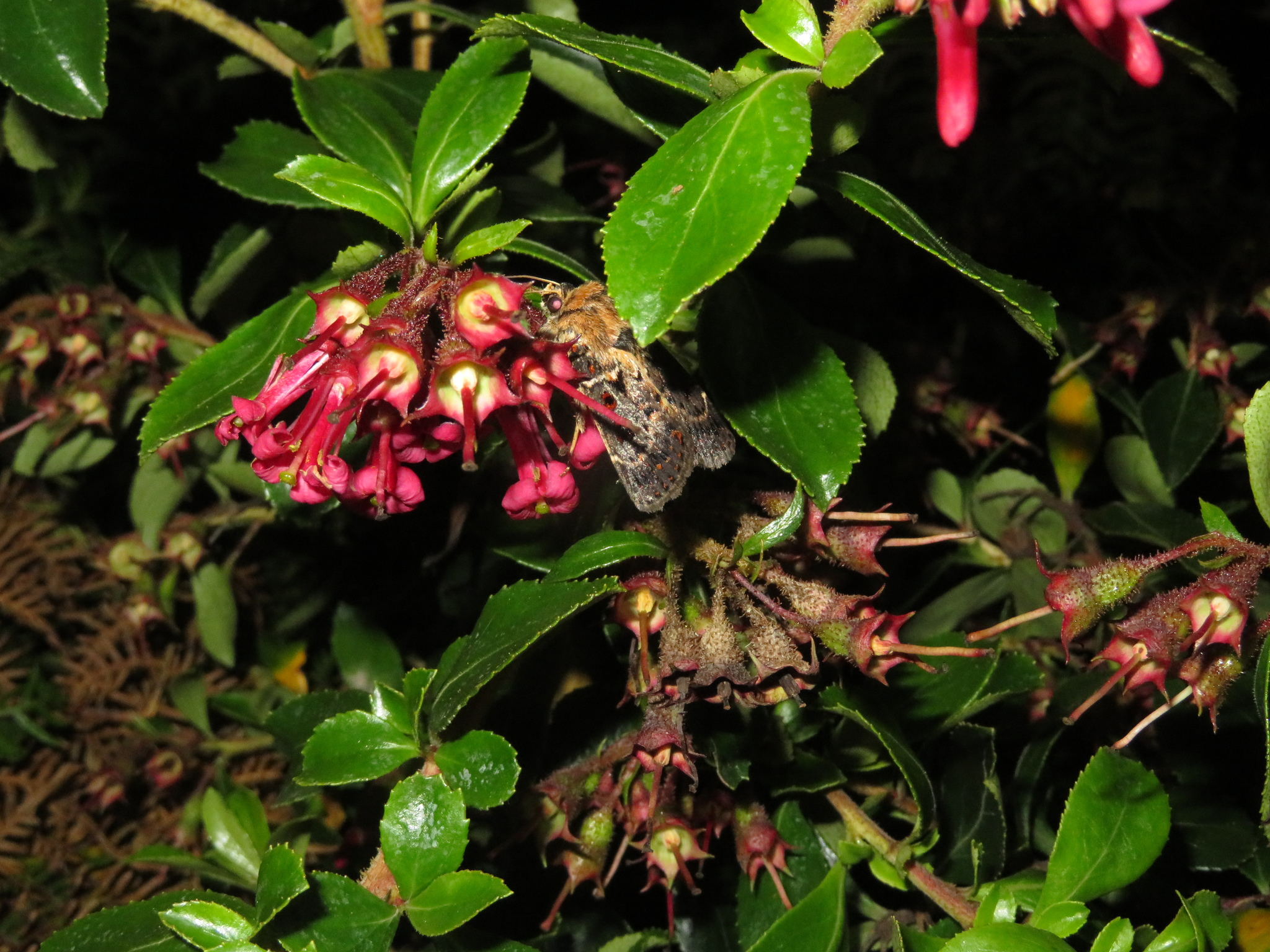
Proteuxoa sanguinipuncta observed in Wellington, New Zealand

This species is Australian but has been recorded in New Zealand since February 2007. Since first being recorded in 2007, this species has become common in the North Island in grassland habitat and has recently been recorded at the top of the South Island.

== Behaviour ==
In New Zealand this species is on the wing from February to April.

== Host species ==
The larvae feed on various grasses.
