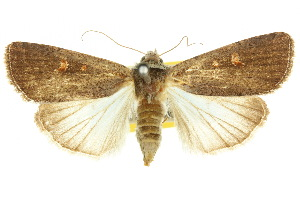

Scientific classification
- Kingdom: Animalia
- Phylum: Arthropoda
- Clade: Pancrustacea
- Class: Insecta
- Order: Lepidoptera
- Superfamily: Noctuoidea
- Family: Noctuidae
- Genus: Proteuxoa
- Species: P. nuna

Binomial name
- Proteuxoa nuna (Guenée, 1868)

Synonyms
- Nitocris nuna Guenée, 1868

= Proteuxoa nuna =

Species of moth

Proteuxoa nuna is a moth of the family Noctuidae first described by Achille Guenée in 1868. It is found in the Australian Capital Territory, New South Wales, South Australia, Victoria and Western Australia.
