= Proteuxoa heterogama =

Scientific classification
- Kingdom: Animalia
- Phylum: Arthropoda
- Clade: Pancrustacea
- Class: Insecta
- Order: Lepidoptera
- Superfamily: Noctuoidea
- Family: Noctuidae
- Genus: Proteuxoa
- Species: P. heterogama

Binomial name
- Proteuxoa heterogama (Hampson, 1909)

Synonyms
- Ariathisa heterogama Hampson, 1909

Species of moth

Proteuxoa heterogama is a moth of the family Noctuidae. It is found in New South Wales.
