= Proteuxoa euchroa =

Scientific classification
- Domain: Eukaryota
- Kingdom: Animalia
- Phylum: Arthropoda
- Class: Insecta
- Order: Lepidoptera
- Superfamily: Noctuoidea
- Family: Noctuidae
- Genus: Proteuxoa
- Species: P. euchroa

Binomial name
- Proteuxoa euchroa (Lower, 1902)

Synonyms
- Caradrina euchroa Lower, 1902

Species of moth

Proteuxoa euchroa is a moth of the family Noctuidae. It is found in the Australian Capital Territory, New South Wales, South Australia and Western Australia. The scientific name of the species was first published in 1902 by Lower.
