= Proteuxoa paratorna =

Scientific classification
- Domain: Eukaryota
- Kingdom: Animalia
- Phylum: Arthropoda
- Class: Insecta
- Order: Lepidoptera
- Superfamily: Noctuoidea
- Family: Noctuidae
- Genus: Proteuxoa
- Species: P. paratorna

Binomial name
- Proteuxoa paratorna (Lower, 1902)

Synonyms
- Caradrina paratorna Lower, 1902

Species of moth

Proteuxoa paratorna is a moth of the family Noctuidae. It is found in South Australia.
