= Proteuxoa hydraecioides =

Scientific classification
- Kingdom: Animalia
- Phylum: Arthropoda
- Class: Insecta
- Order: Lepidoptera
- Superfamily: Noctuoidea
- Family: Noctuidae
- Genus: Proteuxoa
- Species: P. hydraecioides

Binomial name
- Proteuxoa hydraecioides (Guenée, 1852)

Synonyms
- Agrotis hydraecioides Guenée, 1852; Ariathisa hydraecioides (Guenée, 1852)

Species of moth

Proteuxoa hydraecioides is a moth of the family Noctuidae. It is found in Tasmania, Victoria, New South Wales and South Australia.

Larvae have been recorded on Tropaeolum majus.
