= Proteuxoa metaneura =

Scientific classification
- Domain: Eukaryota
- Kingdom: Animalia
- Phylum: Arthropoda
- Class: Insecta
- Order: Lepidoptera
- Superfamily: Noctuoidea
- Family: Noctuidae
- Genus: Proteuxoa
- Species: P. metaneura

Binomial name
- Proteuxoa metaneura (Lower, 1908)

Synonyms
- Prometopus metaneura Lower, 1908; Omphaletis metaneura Hampson, 1909; Omphaletis spodochroa Lower, 1915

Species of moth

Proteuxoa metaneura is a moth of the family Noctuidae. It is found in the Australian Capital Territory, New South Wales, Queensland, South Australia, Victoria and Western Australia.
