= Proteuxoa leucosticta =

Scientific classification
- Domain: Eukaryota
- Kingdom: Animalia
- Phylum: Arthropoda
- Class: Insecta
- Order: Lepidoptera
- Superfamily: Noctuoidea
- Family: Noctuidae
- Genus: Proteuxoa
- Species: P. leucosticta

Binomial name
- Proteuxoa leucosticta (Turner, 1908)

Synonyms
- Caradrina leucosticta Turner, 1908

Species of moth

Proteuxoa leucosticta is a moth of the family Noctuidae. It is found in New South Wales, Tasmania, Victoria and Western Australia.
