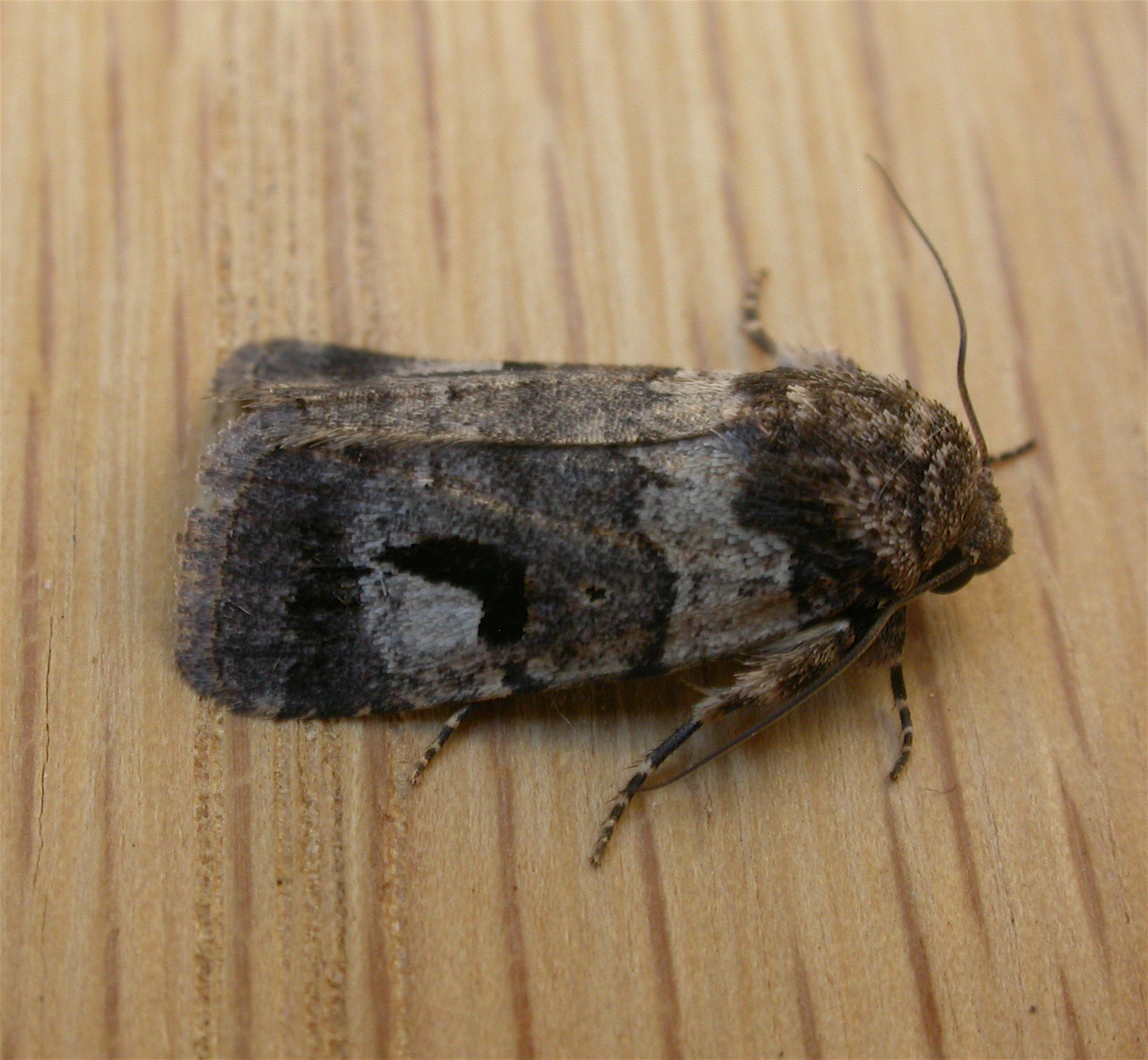

Scientific classification
- Kingdom: Animalia
- Phylum: Arthropoda
- Class: Insecta
- Order: Lepidoptera
- Superfamily: Noctuoidea
- Family: Noctuidae
- Genus: Proteuxoa
- Species: P. flexirena

Binomial name
- Proteuxoa flexirena Walker, 1865

Synonyms
- Orthosia quadriplana

= Proteuxoa flexirena =

Species of moth

Proteuxoa flexirena is a moth of the family Noctuidae. It is found in Australia, including Tasmania.

The wingspan is about 40 mm.
