= Heliocheilus aberrans =

Scientific classification
- Domain: Eukaryota
- Kingdom: Animalia
- Phylum: Arthropoda
- Class: Insecta
- Order: Lepidoptera
- Superfamily: Noctuoidea
- Family: Noctuidae
- Genus: Heliocheilus
- Species: H. aberrans

Binomial name
- Heliocheilus aberrans Butler, 1886

Synonyms
- Melicleptria aberrans; Heliothis aberrans

Species of moth

Heliocheilus aberrans is a moth in the family Noctuidae. It is found in the Australian Capital Territory, New South Wales, Northern Territory, Queensland, Victoria and Western Australia.

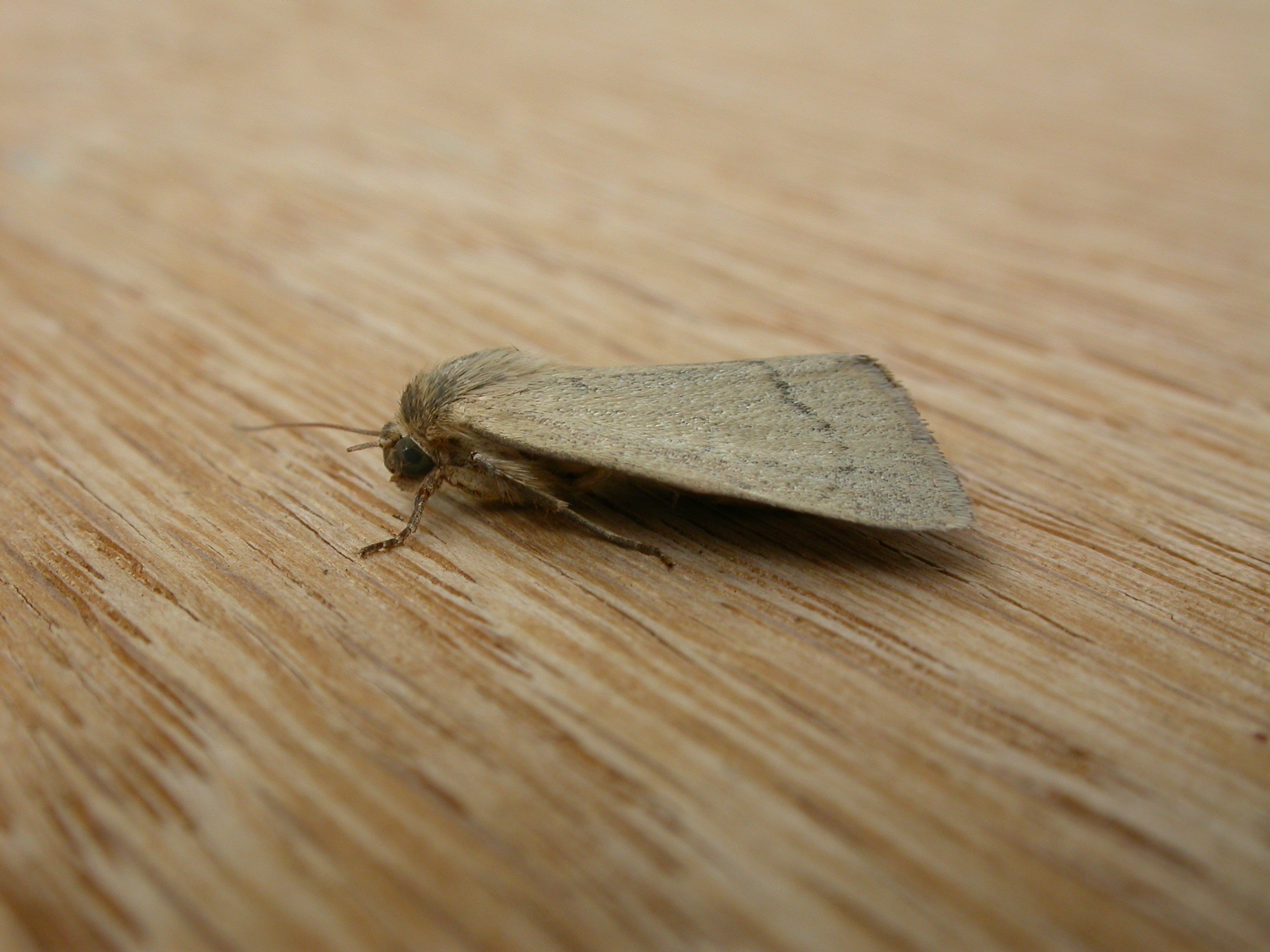
Heliocheilus species, probably either Heliocheilus moribunda or H. aberrans

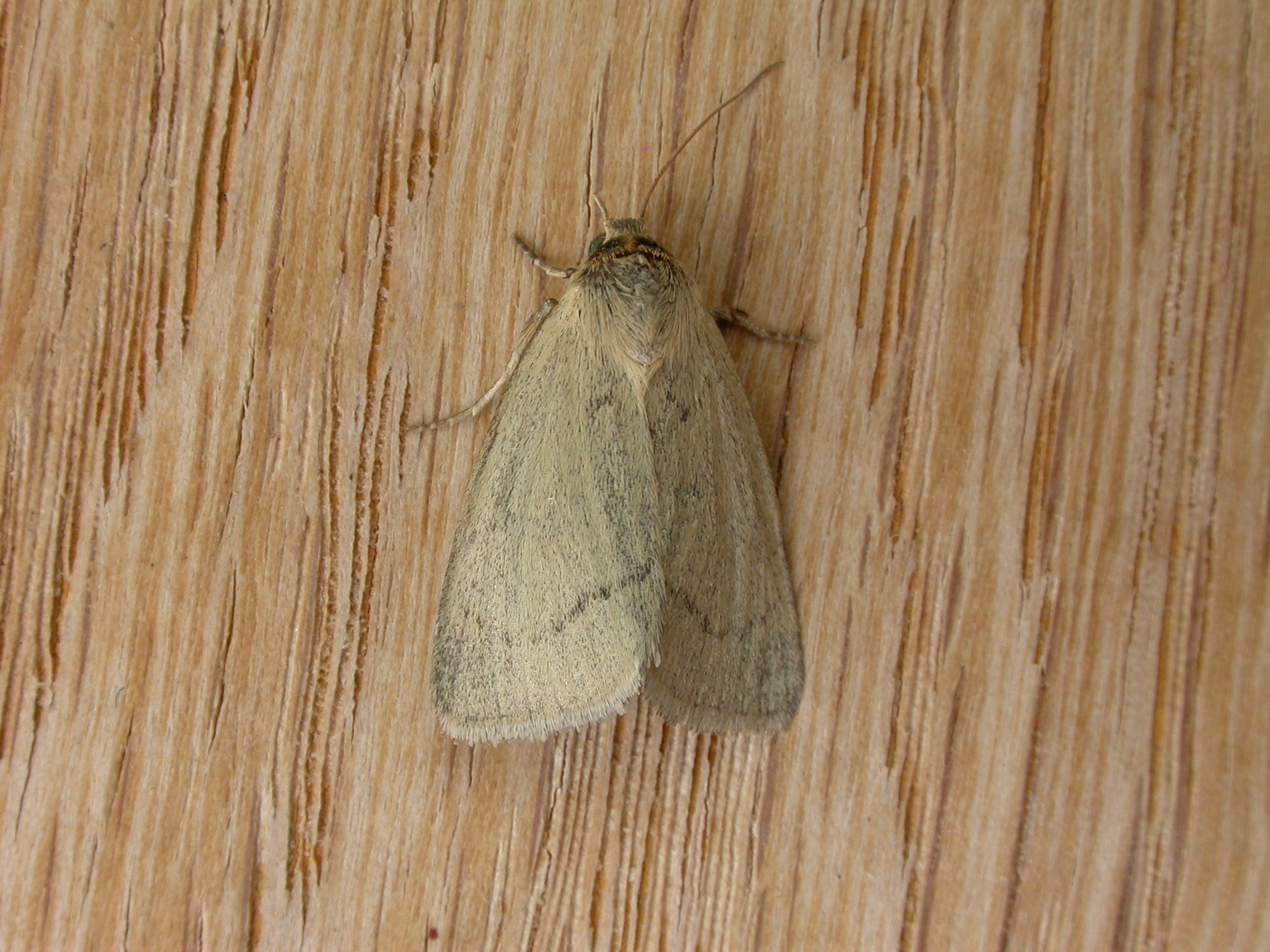
Heliocheilus species, probably either Heliocheilus moribunda or H. aberrans
