= Heliocheilus multiradiata =

Scientific classification
- Kingdom: Animalia
- Phylum: Arthropoda
- Class: Insecta
- Order: Lepidoptera
- Superfamily: Noctuoidea
- Family: Noctuidae
- Genus: Heliocheilus
- Species: H. multiradiata

Binomial name
- Heliocheilus multiradiata (Hampson, 1902)

Synonyms
- Raghuva multiradiata Hampson 1902

Species of moth

Heliocheilus multiradiata is a species of moth of the family Noctuidae first described by George Hampson in 1902. It is found in Africa, including South Africa and Zimbabwe.
