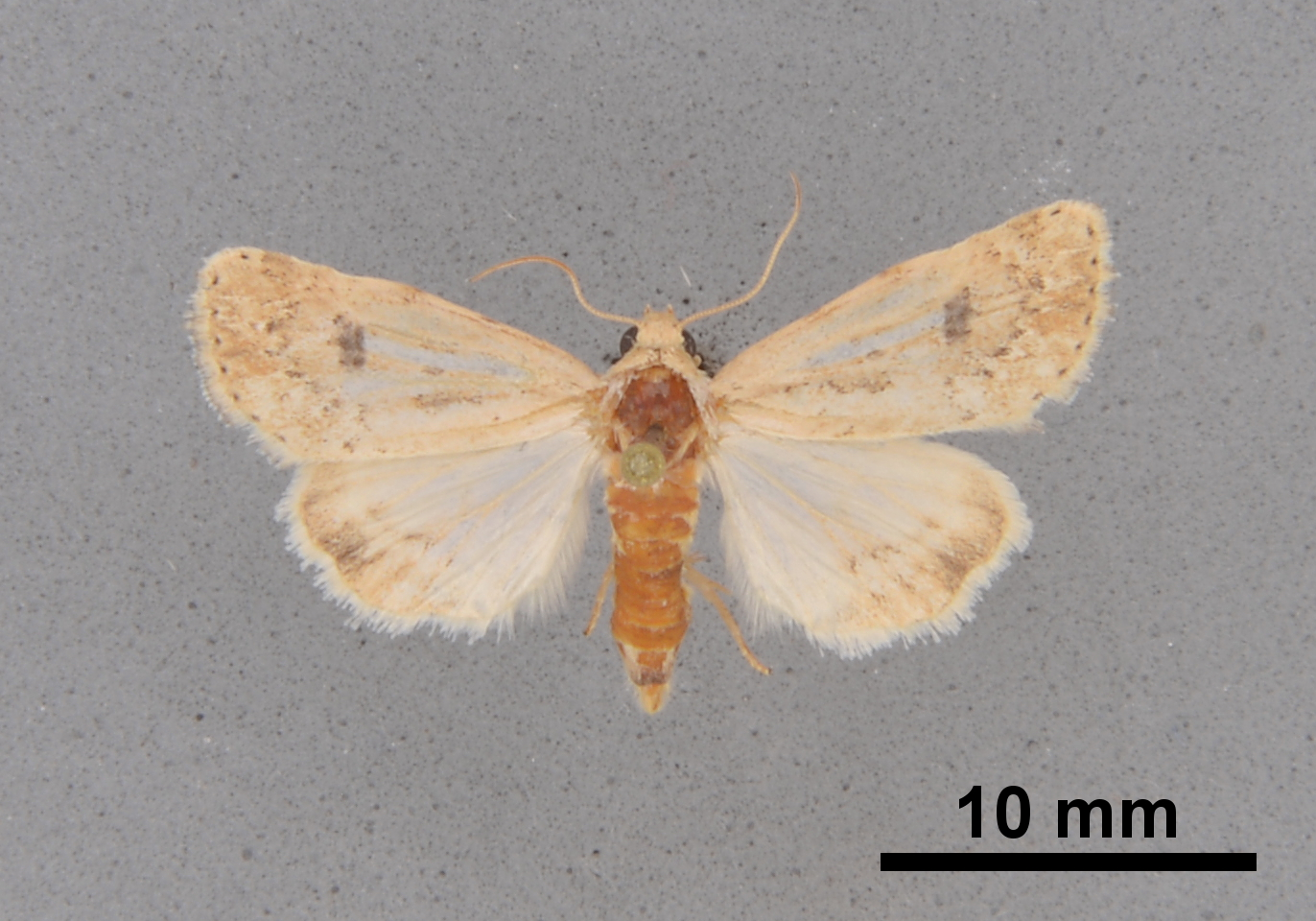

Scientific classification
- Kingdom: Animalia
- Phylum: Arthropoda
- Class: Insecta
- Order: Lepidoptera
- Superfamily: Noctuoidea
- Family: Noctuidae
- Genus: Heliocheilus
- Species: H. confertissima

Binomial name
- Heliocheilus confertissima (Walker, 1865)

Synonyms
- Leucania confertissima Walker, 1865; Heliocheilus mekrana Brandt, 1941; Heliocheilus designata Brandt, 1941

= Heliocheilus confertissima =

Species of moth

Heliocheilus confertissima is a species of moth of the family Noctuidae. It is found from Northern Africa to the Middle East, including Saudi Arabia, Iran and Oman.
