= Heliocheilus melibaphes =

Scientific classification
- Kingdom: Animalia
- Phylum: Arthropoda
- Class: Insecta
- Order: Lepidoptera
- Superfamily: Noctuoidea
- Family: Noctuidae
- Genus: Heliocheilus
- Species: H. melibaphes

Binomial name
- Heliocheilus melibaphes (Hampson, 1903)

Synonyms
- Melicleptria melibaphes Hampson, 1903

Species of moth

Heliocheilus melibaphes is a moth in the family Noctuidae. It is endemic to the Northern Territory, Queensland and Western Australia.
