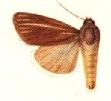

Scientific classification
- Kingdom: Animalia
- Phylum: Arthropoda
- Class: Insecta
- Order: Lepidoptera
- Superfamily: Noctuoidea
- Family: Noctuidae
- Genus: Heliocheilus
- Species: H. eodora

Binomial name
- Heliocheilus eodora (Meyrick, 1902)

Synonyms
- Melicleptria eodora (Meyrick, 1902); Heliothis eodora Meyrick, 1902; Canthylidia tenuistria Turner, 1902

= Heliocheilus eodora =

Species of moth

Heliocheilus eodora is a moth in the family Noctuidae. It is found in the Australian Capital Territory, New South Wales, the Northern Territory, Queensland, South Australia and Western Australia.

Larvae have been recorded on the seedheads of Eulalia aurea.
