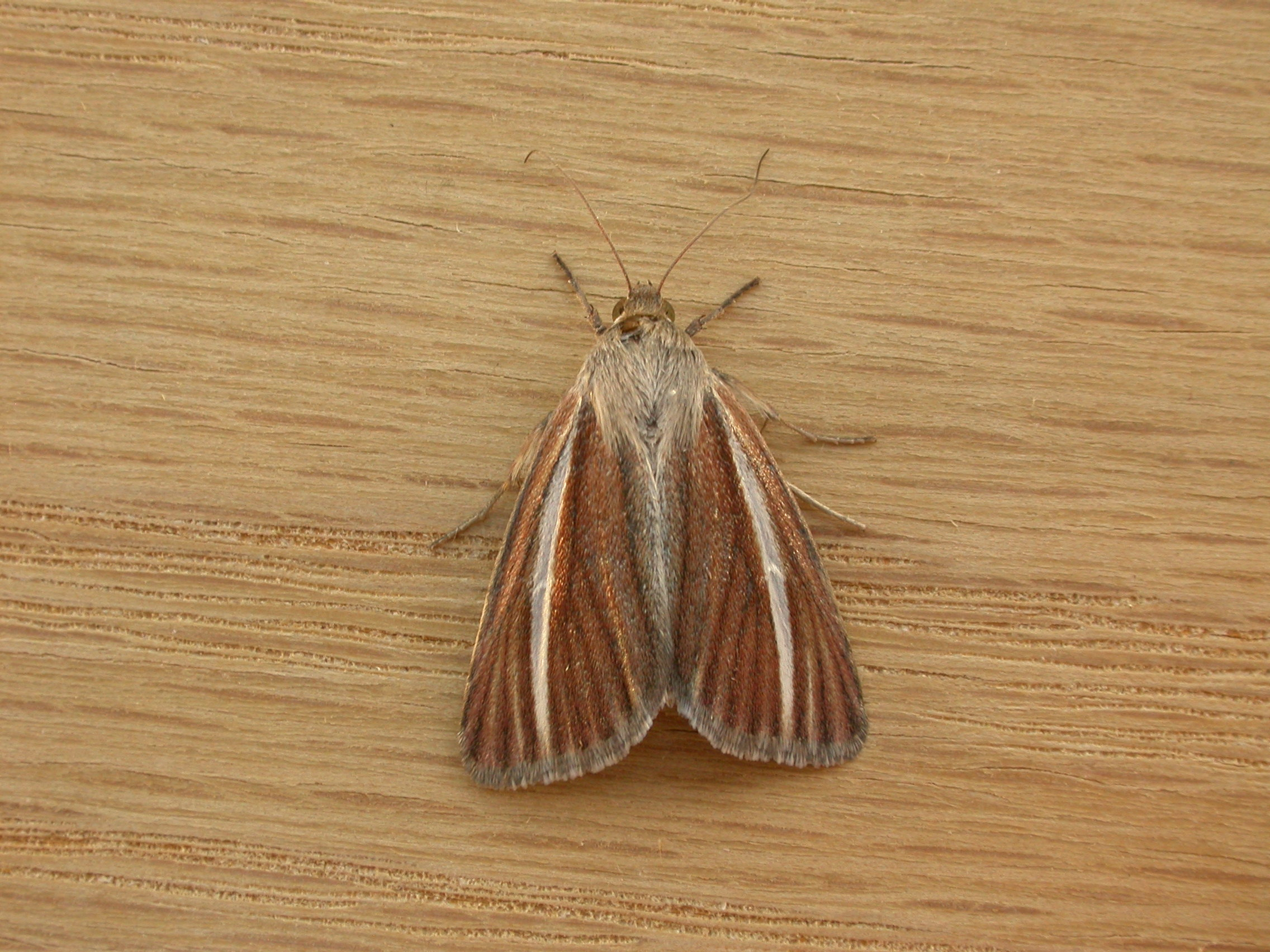
- Heliocheilus cramboides

Scientific classification
- Kingdom: Animalia
- Phylum: Arthropoda
- Class: Insecta
- Order: Lepidoptera
- Superfamily: Noctuoidea
- Family: Noctuidae
- Subfamily: Heliothinae
- Genus: Heliocheilus; Grote, 1865

Synonyms
- Raghuva Moore, 1881; Rhodosea Grote, 1883; Canthylidia Butler, 1886

= Heliocheilus =

Genus of moths

Heliocheilus is a genus of moths of the family Noctuidae. Former synonyms include Canthylidia (Butler, 1886).

== Species ==
- Heliocheilus abaccheutus Matthews, 1999
- Heliocheilus aberrans (Butler, 1886)
- Heliocheilus albipunctella (de Joannis, 1925)
- Heliocheilus albivenata (Montague, 1914)
- Heliocheilus aleurota (Lower, 1902)
- Heliocheilus atrilinea (Turner, 1943)
- Heliocheilus biocularis (Gaede, 1915)
- Heliocheilus canusina (Swinhoe, 1901)
- Heliocheilus cistella (Swinhoe, 1901)
- Heliocheilus cladotus Swinhoe, 1901
- Heliocheilus confertissima (Walker, 1865)
- Heliocheilus cramboides (Guenée, 1852)
- Heliocheilus eodora (Meyrick, 1902)
- Heliocheilus ferruginosa (Turner, 1911)
- Heliocheilus fervens Butler 1881
- Heliocheilus flavitincta (Lower, 1908)
- Heliocheilus fumata (Lucas, 1890)
- Heliocheilus halimolimnus Matthews, 1999
- Heliocheilus ionola (Swinhoe, 1901)
- Heliocheilus julia (Grote, 1883)
- Heliocheilus lupatus (Grote, 1875)
- Heliocheilus melibaphes (Hampson, 1903)
- Heliocheilus mesoleuca (Lower, 1902)
- Heliocheilus moribunda (Guenée, 1852)
- Heliocheilus multiradiata (Hampson, 1902)
- Heliocheilus neurota (Lower, 1903)
- Heliocheilus pallida (Butler, 1886)
- Heliocheilus paradoxus Grote, 1865
- Heliocheilus puncticulata (Warren, 1913)
- Heliocheilus ranalaetensis Matthews, 1999
- Heliocheilus rhodopolia (Turner, 1911)
- Heliocheilus stigmatia (Hampson, 1903)
- Heliocheilus thelycritus Matthews, 1999
- Heliocheilus thomalae (Gaede, 1915)
- Heliocheilus toralis (Grote, 1881)
- Heliocheilus turbata (Walker, 1858)
- Heliocheilus vulpinotatus Matthews, 1999
