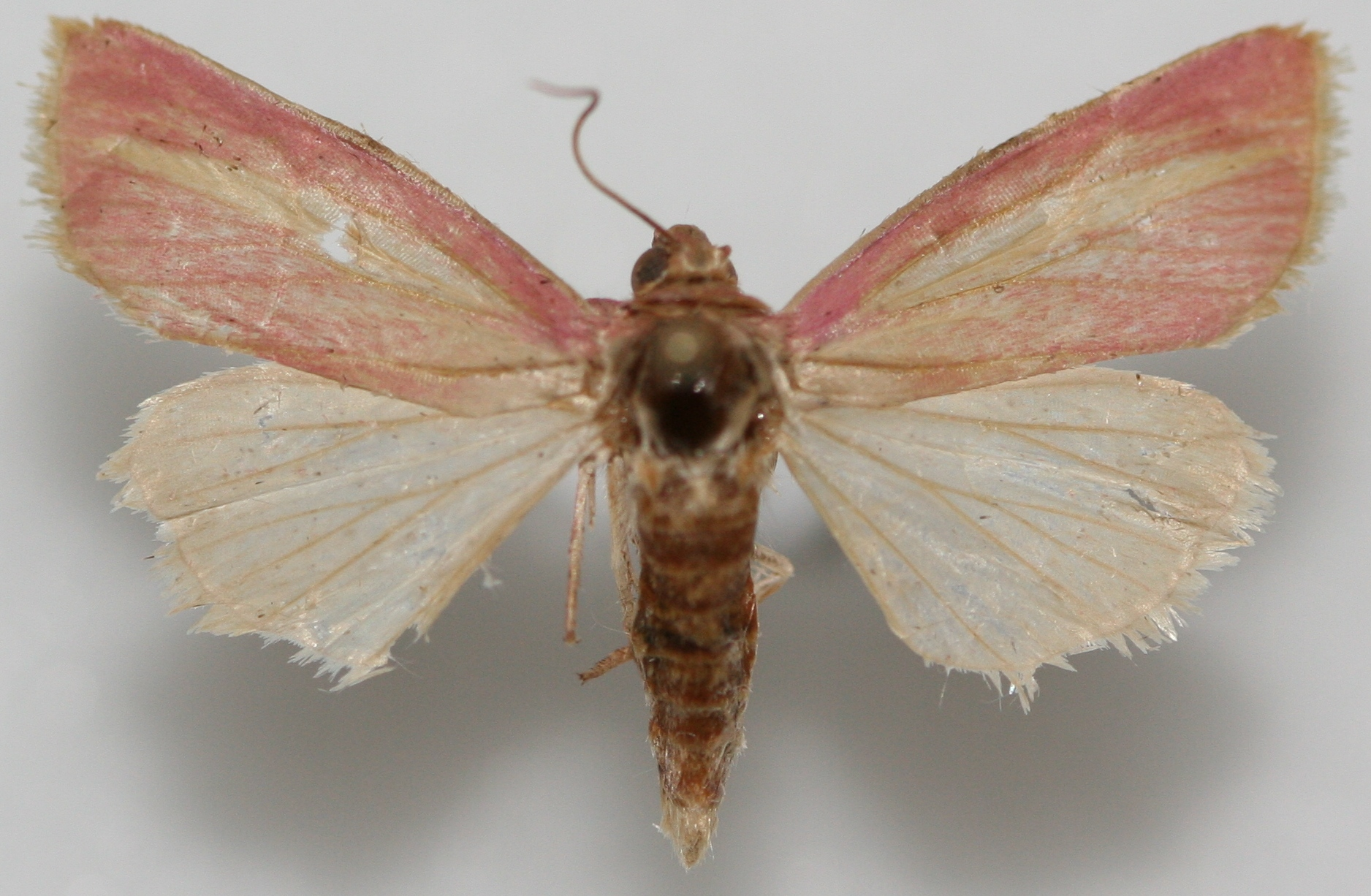

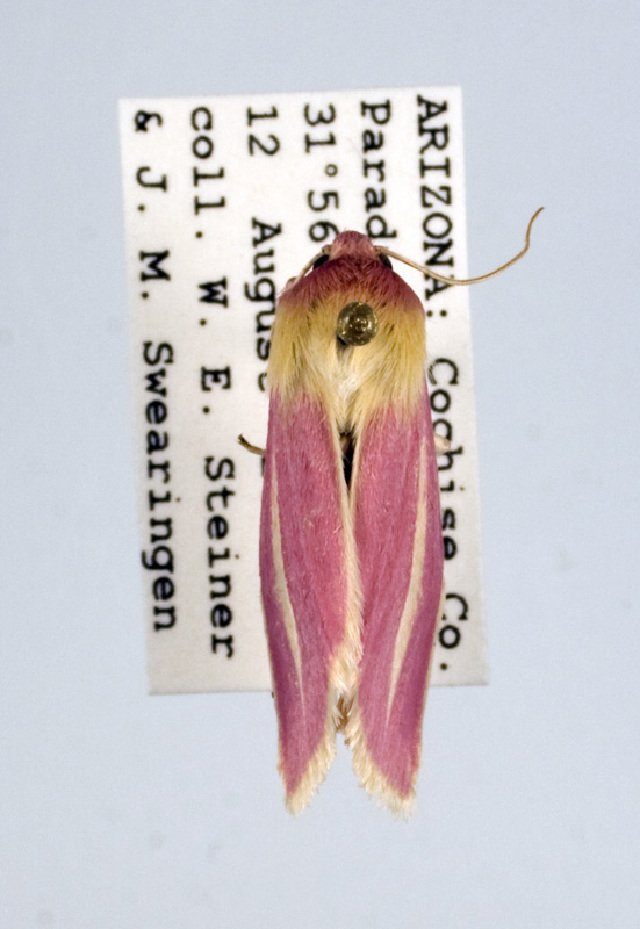

Scientific classification
- Kingdom: Animalia
- Phylum: Arthropoda
- Class: Insecta
- Order: Lepidoptera
- Superfamily: Noctuoidea
- Family: Noctuidae
- Genus: Heliocheilus
- Species: H. julia

Binomial name
- Heliocheilus julia (Grote, 1883)

= Heliocheilus julia =

Species of moth

Heliocheilus julia is a North American moth in the family Noctuidae. Heliocheilus julia is attracted to lights. Its life history and host plants are unknown. The common name “Barbie Moth” has been proposed for the species by digital creator azmacroguy.

== Distribution ==
Heliocheilus julia ranges from central New Mexico west to eastern Arizona and south to Jalisco, Mexico.

== Flight ==
This moth has one flight from late July to September.
