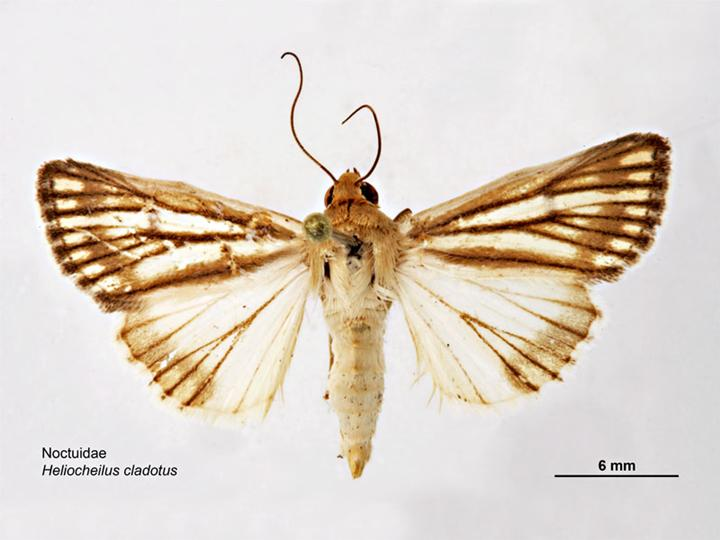
- Dorsal view
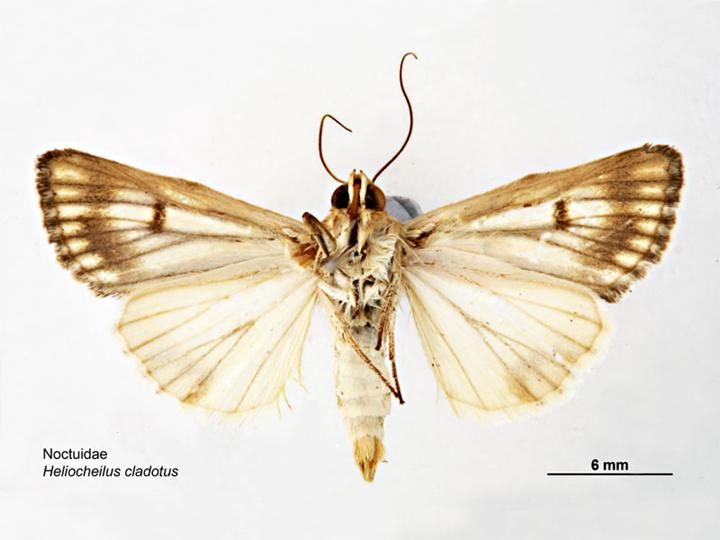
- Ventral view

Scientific classification
- Domain: Eukaryota
- Kingdom: Animalia
- Phylum: Arthropoda
- Class: Insecta
- Order: Lepidoptera
- Superfamily: Noctuoidea
- Family: Noctuidae
- Genus: Heliocheilus
- Species: H. cladotus

Binomial name
- Heliocheilus cladotus Swinhoe, 1901

= Heliocheilus cladotus =

Species of moth

Heliocheilus cladotus is a moth in the family Noctuidae. It is endemic to New South Wales, the Northern Territory, Queensland, South Australia and Western Australia.
