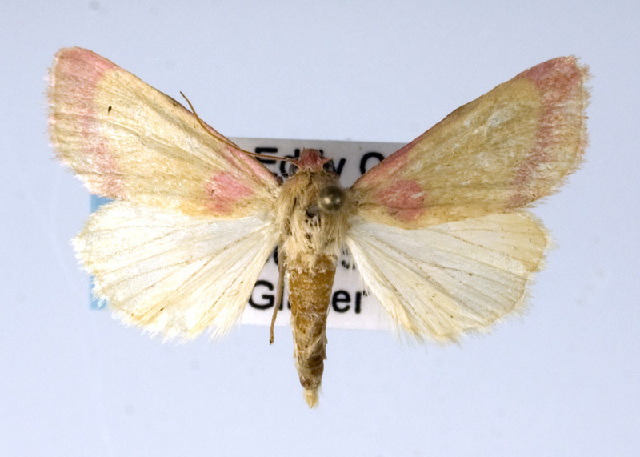

Scientific classification
- Kingdom: Animalia
- Phylum: Arthropoda
- Class: Insecta
- Order: Lepidoptera
- Superfamily: Noctuoidea
- Family: Noctuidae
- Genus: Heliocheilus
- Species: H. toralis

Binomial name
- Heliocheilus toralis (Grote, 1881)

Synonyms
- Botis toralis Grote, 1881; Heliocheilus rosario Barnes, 1904; Heliocheilus unicolor Walter, 1928

= Heliocheilus toralis =

Species of moth

Heliocheilus toralis is a moth in the family Noctuidae. It is found in North America, including Arizona and Texas.

The wingspan is 23–25 mm.
