= Heliocheilus biocularis =

Scientific classification
- Domain: Eukaryota
- Kingdom: Animalia
- Phylum: Arthropoda
- Class: Insecta
- Order: Lepidoptera
- Superfamily: Noctuoidea
- Family: Noctuidae
- Genus: Heliocheilus
- Species: H. biocularis

Binomial name
- Heliocheilus biocularis (Gaede, 1915)

Synonyms
- Raghuva biocularis Gaede, 1915

Species of moth

Heliocheilus biocularis is a species of moth of the family Noctuidae first described by Max Gaede in 1915. It is found in Africa, including South Africa.

This species has a wingspan of 23 mm.
