= Heliocheilus thelycritus =

Scientific classification
- Domain: Eukaryota
- Kingdom: Animalia
- Phylum: Arthropoda
- Class: Insecta
- Order: Lepidoptera
- Superfamily: Noctuoidea
- Family: Noctuidae
- Genus: Heliocheilus
- Species: H. thelycritus

Binomial name
- Heliocheilus thelycritus Matthews, 1999

Species of moth

Heliocheilus thelycritus is a moth in the family Noctuidae. It is endemic to the Northern Territory, Queensland and Western Australia.
