= Heliocheilus mesoleuca =

Scientific classification
- Domain: Eukaryota
- Kingdom: Animalia
- Phylum: Arthropoda
- Class: Insecta
- Order: Lepidoptera
- Superfamily: Noctuoidea
- Family: Noctuidae
- Genus: Heliocheilus
- Species: H. mesoleuca

Binomial name
- Heliocheilus mesoleuca (Lower, 1902)

Synonyms
- Melicleptria mesoleuca Hampson, 1903; Canthylidia mesoleuca Lower, 1902

Species of moth

Heliocheilus mesoleuca is a moth in the family Noctuidae first described by Oswald Bertram Lower in 1902. It is found in Australia in New South Wales, the Northern Territory, Queensland and South Australia.
