= Heliocheilus albivenata =

Scientific classification
- Domain: Eukaryota
- Kingdom: Animalia
- Phylum: Arthropoda
- Class: Insecta
- Order: Lepidoptera
- Superfamily: Noctuoidea
- Family: Noctuidae
- Genus: Heliocheilus
- Species: H. albivenata

Binomial name
- Heliocheilus albivenata (Montague, 1914)

Synonyms
- Melicleptria albivenata Montague, 1914; Melicleptria bipartita Strand, 1924; Melicleptria stramineipicta Strand, 1924; Canthylidia zorophanes Turner, 1929

Species of moth

Heliocheilus albivenata is a moth in the family Noctuidae. It is endemic to Western Australia.

Larvae have been recorded on male flowers of Spinifex longifolius.
