= Heliocheilus ionola =

Scientific classification
- Domain: Eukaryota
- Kingdom: Animalia
- Phylum: Arthropoda
- Class: Insecta
- Order: Lepidoptera
- Superfamily: Noctuoidea
- Family: Noctuidae
- Genus: Heliocheilus
- Species: H. ionola

Binomial name
- Heliocheilus ionola (Swinhoe, 1901)

Synonyms
- Melicleptria ionola (Swinhoe, 1901); Adisura ionola Swinhoe, 1901

Species of moth

Heliocheilus ionola is a moth in the family Noctuidae. It is found in the Australian Capital Territory, New South Wales, the Northern Territory, Queensland, and Western Australia.
