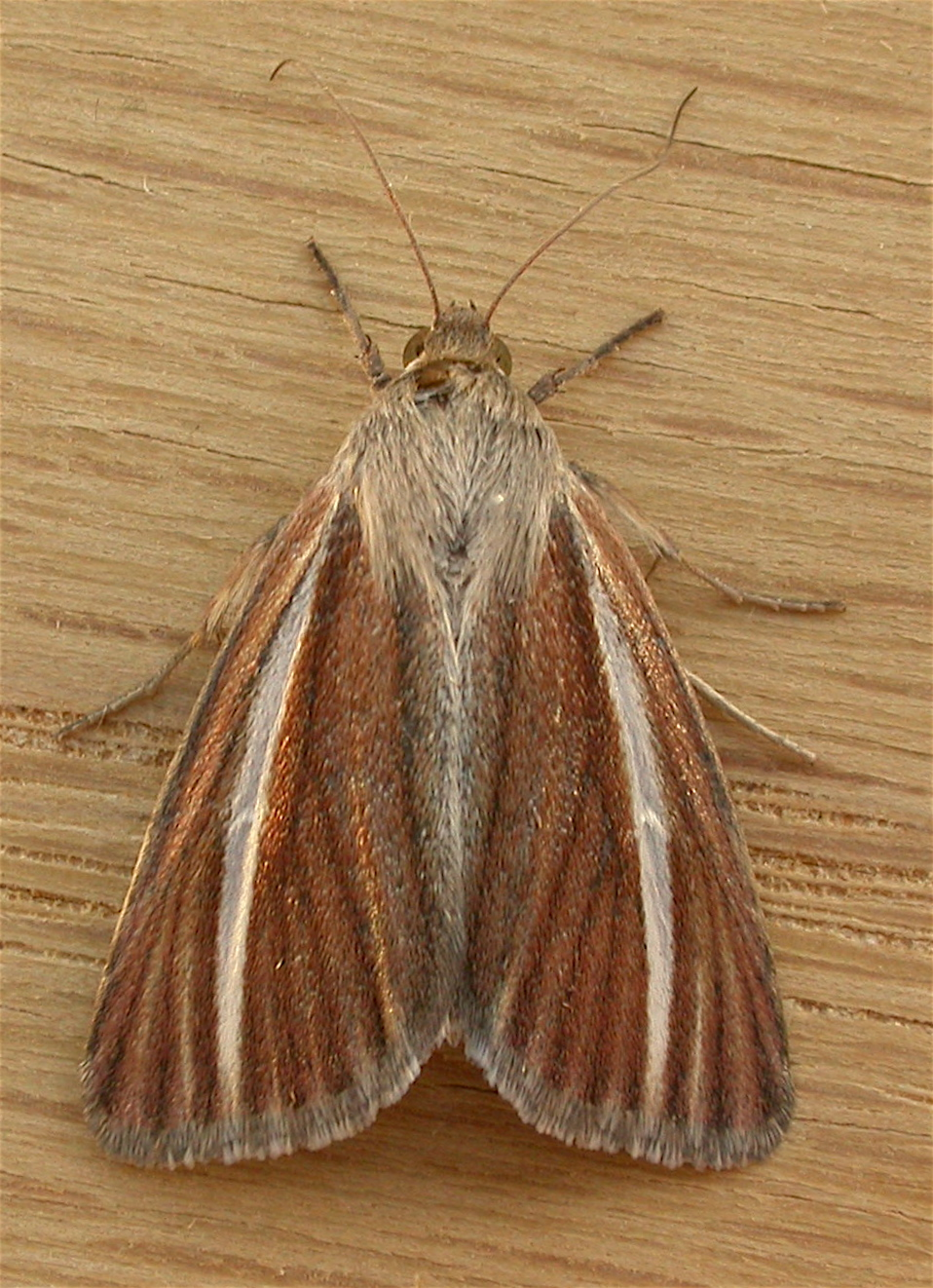

Scientific classification
- Kingdom: Animalia
- Phylum: Arthropoda
- Class: Insecta
- Order: Lepidoptera
- Superfamily: Noctuoidea
- Family: Noctuidae
- Genus: Heliocheilus
- Species: H. cramboides

Binomial name
- Heliocheilus cramboides Guenee, 1852

Synonyms
- Melicleptria cramboides (Guenée, 1852); Leucania cramboides Guenée, 1852; Canthylidia intensa; Canthylidia semiochrea; Canthylidia semigrisea; Melicleptria neurias; Heliocheilus neurias; Heliothis neurias Meyrick, 1902; Canthylidia venata Warren, 1913; Canthylidia discolor Warren, 1913; Canthylidia sumbensis Warren, 1913; Canthylidia sericea Warren, 1913; Canthylidia sulphurea Warren, 1913; Canthylidia capnoneura Turner, 1932; Canthylidia nervosa Turner, 1943; Heliocheilus venata (Warren, 1913); Heliocheilus sulphurea (Warren, 1913)

= Heliocheilus cramboides =

Species of moth

Heliocheilus cramboides is a moth of the family Noctuidae. It is found in Victoria, Western Australia, the Australian Capital Territory, New South Wales, the Northern Territory, Queensland and South Australia.

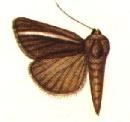

Larvae have been recorded on the seedheads of Sorghum intrans .
