= Heliocheilus flavitincta =

Scientific classification
- Domain: Eukaryota
- Kingdom: Animalia
- Phylum: Arthropoda
- Class: Insecta
- Order: Lepidoptera
- Superfamily: Noctuoidea
- Family: Noctuidae
- Genus: Heliocheilus
- Species: H. flavitincta

Binomial name
- Heliocheilus flavitincta (Lower, 1908)

Synonyms
- Meliceptria flavitincta Lower, 1908

Species of moth

Heliocheilus flavitincta is a moth in the family Noctuidae. It is endemic to the Northern Territory and Western Australia.
