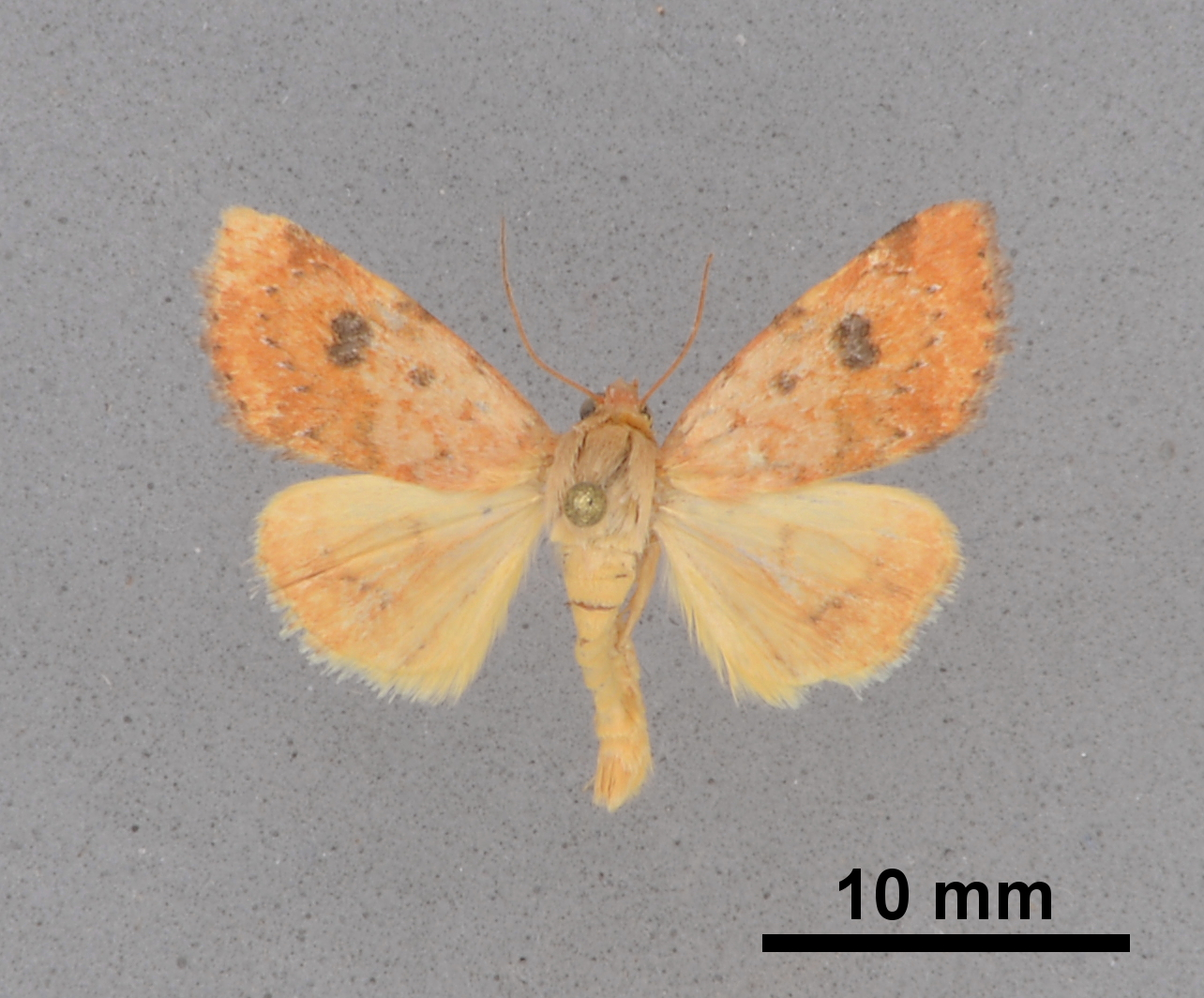

Scientific classification
- Kingdom: Animalia
- Phylum: Arthropoda
- Class: Insecta
- Order: Lepidoptera
- Superfamily: Noctuoidea
- Family: Noctuidae
- Genus: Heliocheilus
- Species: H. turbata

Binomial name
- Heliocheilus turbata (Walker, 1858)

Synonyms
- Poaphila turbata Walker, 1858; Heliocheilus albidentina Walker, 1865; Heliothis turbatus; Heliocheilus turbatus

= Heliocheilus turbata =

Species of moth

Heliocheilus turbata, the spotted straw moth, is a moth in the family Noctuidae. It is found in North America, including Georgia.

Heliocheilus lupatus is no longer considered a synonym of Heliocheilus turbata.
