= Heliocheilus cistella =

Scientific classification
- Domain: Eukaryota
- Kingdom: Animalia
- Phylum: Arthropoda
- Class: Insecta
- Order: Lepidoptera
- Superfamily: Noctuoidea
- Family: Noctuidae
- Genus: Heliocheilus
- Species: H. cistella

Binomial name
- Heliocheilus cistella (Swinhoe, 1901)

Synonyms
- Melicleptria cistella; Canthylidia cistella Swinhoe, 1901

Species of moth

Heliocheilus cistella is a moth in the family Noctuidae. It is found in the Australian states of Northern Territories, Queensland and Western Australia.
