= Heliocheilus fumata =

Scientific classification
- Domain: Eukaryota
- Kingdom: Animalia
- Phylum: Arthropoda
- Class: Insecta
- Order: Lepidoptera
- Superfamily: Noctuoidea
- Family: Noctuidae
- Genus: Heliocheilus
- Species: H. fumata

Binomial name
- Heliocheilus fumata (T.P. Lucas, 1890)

Synonyms
- Leucania fumata T.P. Lucas, 1890

Species of moth

Heliocheilus fumata is a moth in the family Noctuidae. It is endemic to Queensland.
