= Heliocheilus fervens =

Scientific classification
- Domain: Eukaryota
- Kingdom: Animalia
- Phylum: Arthropoda
- Class: Insecta
- Order: Lepidoptera
- Superfamily: Noctuoidea
- Family: Noctuidae
- Genus: Heliocheilus
- Species: H. fervens

Binomial name
- Heliocheilus fervens (Butler, 1881)

Synonyms
- Heliothis fervens Butler, 1881; Heliothis foveolatus Staudinger, 1881; Chloridea fervens

Species of moth

Heliocheilus fervens is a species of moth of the family Noctuidae. It is found in China, Japan, the Korean Peninsula, northern India, Pakistan and the Russian Far East (Primorye, southern Khabarovsk and the southern Amur region)
