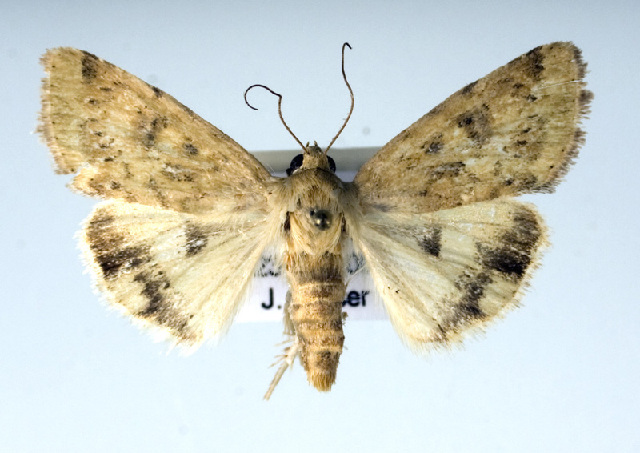

Scientific classification
- Kingdom: Animalia
- Phylum: Arthropoda
- Class: Insecta
- Order: Lepidoptera
- Superfamily: Noctuoidea
- Family: Noctuidae
- Genus: Heliocheilus
- Species: H. paradoxus

Binomial name
- Heliocheilus paradoxus Grote, 1865

Synonyms
- Heliocheilus hyperfusca Strand, 1916; Heliothis paradoxus

= Heliocheilus paradoxus =

Paradoxical grass moth

Species of moth

Heliocheilus paradoxus, the paradoxical grass moth, is a species of moth of the family Noctuidae. It is found from Ontario and British Columbia, south to at least California, Arizona, Texas and Florida.

The wingspan is 24–26 mm.
