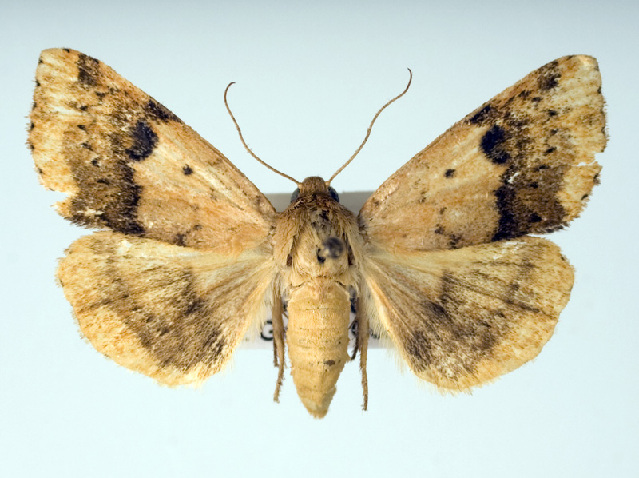

Scientific classification
- Kingdom: Animalia
- Phylum: Arthropoda
- Class: Insecta
- Order: Lepidoptera
- Superfamily: Noctuoidea
- Family: Noctuidae
- Genus: Heliocheilus
- Species: H. lupatus

Binomial name
- Heliocheilus lupatus (Grote, 1875)

= Heliocheilus lupatus =

Species of moth

Heliocheilus lupatus, the purple topper, lupatus straw moth or spotted straw moth, is a moth in the family Noctuidae. The species was first described by Augustus Radcliffe Grote in 1875. It is found in the United States from Kentucky and central Connecticut south (through Georgia, North Carolina and South Carolina) to Florida and Texas.

It was formerly considered to be a synonym of Heliocheilus turbata.

The wingspan is about 28 mm. There is one generation per year.

The larvae feed on various grasses.
