= Heliocheilus rhodopolia =

Scientific classification
- Domain: Eukaryota
- Kingdom: Animalia
- Phylum: Arthropoda
- Class: Insecta
- Order: Lepidoptera
- Superfamily: Noctuoidea
- Family: Noctuidae
- Genus: Heliocheilus
- Species: H. rhodopolia

Binomial name
- Heliocheilus rhodopolia (Turner, 1911)

Synonyms
- Canthylidia rhodopolia Turner, 1911

Species of moth

Heliocheilus rhodopolia is a moth in the family Noctuidae. It is endemic to New South Wales, the Northern Territory, Queensland and Western Australia.
