= Heliocheilus thomalae =

Scientific classification
- Kingdom: Animalia
- Phylum: Arthropoda
- Class: Insecta
- Order: Lepidoptera
- Superfamily: Noctuoidea
- Family: Noctuidae
- Genus: Heliocheilus
- Species: H. thomalae

Binomial name
- Heliocheilus thomalae (Gaede, 1915)

Synonyms
- Raghuva thomalae Gaede, 1915

Species of moth

Heliocheilus thomalae is a moth in the family Noctuidae. It is found in Tanzania.

This species has a wingspan of 19–20 mm (0.75–0.79 in) and the holotype was caught in Gomba, district of Amani, Tanzania.

Gaede named this species after Miss Thomala, preparator at the Berlin Museum für Naturkunde who draw his attention on this species.
