= Heliocheilus neurota =

Scientific classification
- Domain: Eukaryota
- Kingdom: Animalia
- Phylum: Arthropoda
- Class: Insecta
- Order: Lepidoptera
- Superfamily: Noctuoidea
- Family: Noctuidae
- Genus: Heliocheilus
- Species: H. neurota

Binomial name
- Heliocheilus neurota (Lower, 1903)

Synonyms
- Tarache neurota Lower, 1903; Canthylidia clathrata Warren, 1913; Heliocheilus clathrata (Warren, 1913); Canthylidia eurhythma Turner, 1915; Canthylidia crocopepla Turner, 1925; Oruza crocotoschema Turner, 1936; Heliocheilus crocotoschema (Turner, 1936)

Species of moth

Heliocheilus neurota is a moth in the family Noctuidae. It is endemic to New South Wales, the Northern Territory, Queensland and Western Australia.
