= Heliocheilus canusina =

Scientific classification
- Kingdom: Animalia
- Phylum: Arthropoda
- Class: Insecta
- Order: Lepidoptera
- Superfamily: Noctuoidea
- Family: Noctuidae
- Genus: Heliocheilus
- Species: H. canusina

Binomial name
- Heliocheilus canusina Swinhoe, 1901

Synonyms
- Melicleptria canusina; Canthylidia canusina Swinhoe, 1901; Canthylidia intacta; Canthylidia anemodes Lower, 1902; Heliocheilus anemodes (Lower, 1902)

Species of moth

Heliocheilus canusina is a moth in the family Noctuidae. It is endemic to the Northern Territory, Queensland and Western Australia.
