= Heliocheilus abaccheutus =

Scientific classification
- Kingdom: Animalia
- Phylum: Arthropoda
- Clade: Pancrustacea
- Class: Insecta
- Order: Lepidoptera
- Superfamily: Noctuoidea
- Family: Noctuidae
- Genus: Heliocheilus
- Species: H. abaccheutus

Binomial name
- Heliocheilus abaccheutus Matthews, 1999

Species of moth

Heliocheilus abaccheutus is a moth in the family Noctuidae. It is endemic to Queensland, Australia.
