= Heliocheilus pallida =

Scientific classification
- Domain: Eukaryota
- Kingdom: Animalia
- Phylum: Arthropoda
- Class: Insecta
- Order: Lepidoptera
- Superfamily: Noctuoidea
- Family: Noctuidae
- Genus: Heliocheilus
- Species: H. pallida

Binomial name
- Heliocheilus pallida Butler, 1886

Synonyms
- Melicleptria osmida; Canthylidia albida Warren, 1913; Canthylidia pallida Butler, 1886; Heliocheilus osmidus Swinhoe, 1901; Canthylidia rosea Warren, 1913; Heliocheilus rosea (Warren, 1913)

Species of moth

Heliocheilus pallida is a moth in the family Noctuidae. It is found in the Australian Capital Territory, New South Wales, the Northern Territory, Queensland, South Australia and Western Australia.

Larvae have been recorded feeding on the seedheads of Dichantium tenuiculum.
