= Heliocheilus puncticulata =

Scientific classification
- Domain: Eukaryota
- Kingdom: Animalia
- Phylum: Arthropoda
- Class: Insecta
- Order: Lepidoptera
- Superfamily: Noctuoidea
- Family: Noctuidae
- Genus: Heliocheilus
- Species: H. puncticulata

Binomial name
- Heliocheilus puncticulata (Warren, 1913)

Synonyms
- Canthylidia puncticulata Warren, 1913

Species of moth

Heliocheilus puncticulata is a moth in the family Noctuidae. It is endemic to the Northern Territory, Queensland and Western Australia.
