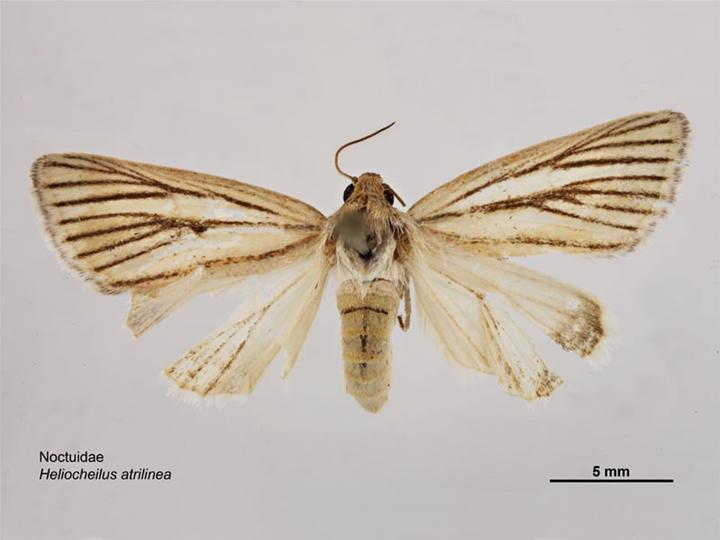
- Dorsal view
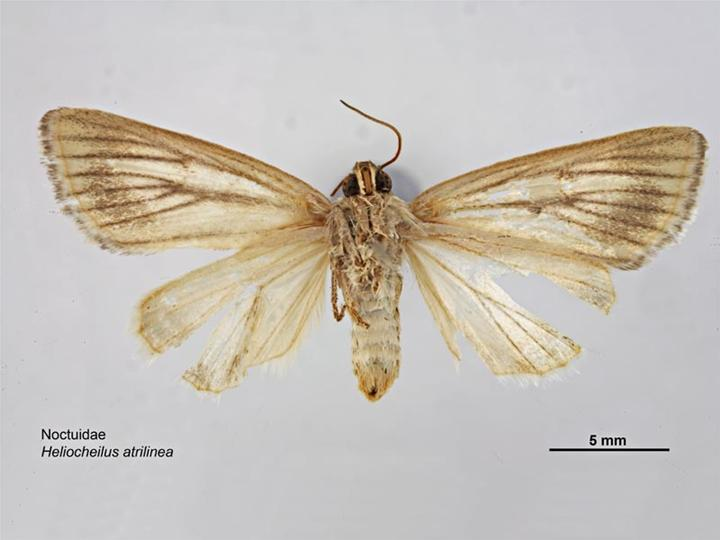
- Ventral view

Scientific classification
- Domain: Eukaryota
- Kingdom: Animalia
- Phylum: Arthropoda
- Class: Insecta
- Order: Lepidoptera
- Superfamily: Noctuoidea
- Family: Noctuidae
- Genus: Heliocheilus
- Species: H. atrilinea

Binomial name
- Heliocheilus atrilinea (Turner, 1943)

Synonyms
- Canthylidia atrilinea Turner, 1943

= Heliocheilus atrilinea =

Species of moth

Heliocheilus atrilinea is a moth in the family Noctuidae. It is endemic to the Northern Territory, Queensland and Western Australia.
