= Heliocheilus aleurota =

Scientific classification
- Domain: Eukaryota
- Kingdom: Animalia
- Phylum: Arthropoda
- Class: Insecta
- Order: Lepidoptera
- Superfamily: Noctuoidea
- Family: Noctuidae
- Genus: Heliocheilus
- Species: H. aleurota

Binomial name
- Heliocheilus aleurota Lower, 1902

Synonyms
- Melicleptria aleurota Lower, 1902; Canthylidia aleurota Hampson, 1903; Canthylidia spissata; Canthylidia cana Turner, 1943

Species of moth

Heliocheilus aleurota is a moth in the family Noctuidae. It is found in New South Wales, the Northern Territory, Queensland, South Australia, Victoria and Western Australia.
