= Heliocheilus stigmatia =

Scientific classification
- Kingdom: Animalia
- Phylum: Arthropoda
- Class: Insecta
- Order: Lepidoptera
- Superfamily: Noctuoidea
- Family: Noctuidae
- Genus: Heliocheilus
- Species: H. stigmatia

Binomial name
- Heliocheilus stigmatia (Hampson, 1903)

Synonyms
- Raghuva stigmatia Hampson, 1903

Species of moth

Heliocheilus stigmatia is a species of moth of the family Noctuidae. It is found in Lesotho, the Eastern Cape, KwaZulu-Natal, Transvaal, Zimbabwe, Botswana and Namibia.
