= Heliocheilus ferruginosa =

Scientific classification
- Domain: Eukaryota
- Kingdom: Animalia
- Phylum: Arthropoda
- Class: Insecta
- Order: Lepidoptera
- Superfamily: Noctuoidea
- Family: Noctuidae
- Genus: Heliocheilus
- Species: H. ferruginosa

Binomial name
- Heliocheilus ferruginosa (Turner, 1911)

Synonyms
- Canthylidia ferruginosa Turner, 1911; Canthylidia epigrapha Turner, 1920; Heliocheilus epigrapha (Turner, 1920)

Species of moth

Heliocheilus ferruginosa is a moth in the family Noctuidae. It is endemic to the Northern Territory, Queensland and Western Australia.
