= Heliocheilus vulpinotatus =

Scientific classification
- Domain: Eukaryota
- Kingdom: Animalia
- Phylum: Arthropoda
- Class: Insecta
- Order: Lepidoptera
- Superfamily: Noctuoidea
- Family: Noctuidae
- Genus: Heliocheilus
- Species: H. vulpinotatus

Binomial name
- Heliocheilus vulpinotatus Matthews, 1999

Species of moth

Heliocheilus vulpinotatus is a moth in the family Noctuidae. It is endemic to the Australian Capital Territory, New South Wales and Queensland.
