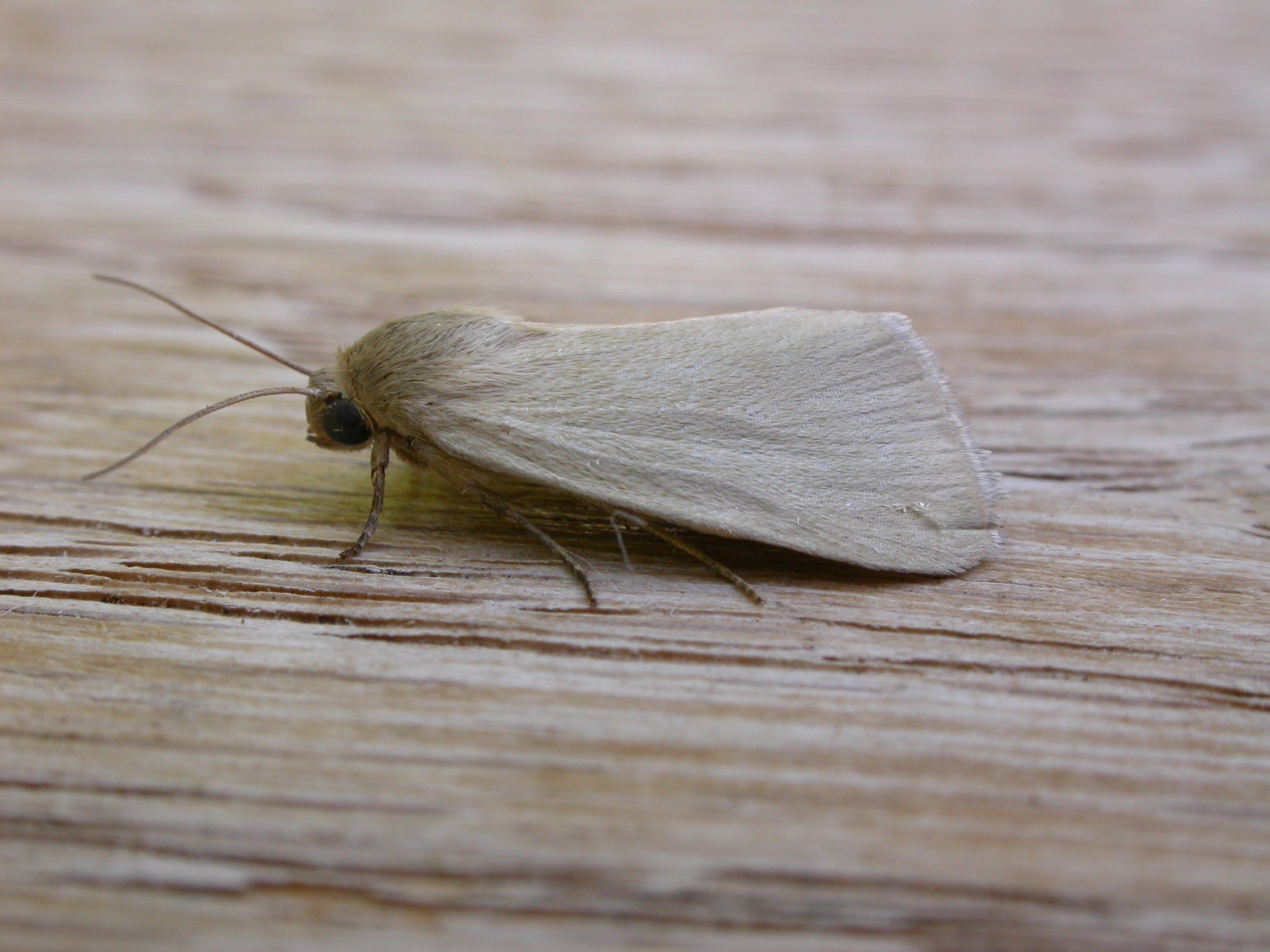

Scientific classification
- Kingdom: Animalia
- Phylum: Arthropoda
- Class: Insecta
- Order: Lepidoptera
- Superfamily: Noctuoidea
- Family: Noctuidae
- Genus: Heliocheilus
- Species: H. moribunda

Binomial name
- Heliocheilus moribunda (Guenee, 1852)

Synonyms
- Melicleptria moribunda; Leucania moribunda Guenée, 1852; Leucania invaria Walker, 1856; Canthylidia pallescens Warren, 1913; Canthylidia arenosa Turner, 1943; Heliocheilus arenosa (Turner, 1943)

= Heliocheilus moribunda =

Species of moth

Heliocheilus moribunda is a moth in the family Noctuidae. It is found in the Australian Capital Territory, New South Wales, the Northern Territory, Queensland and Western Australia.

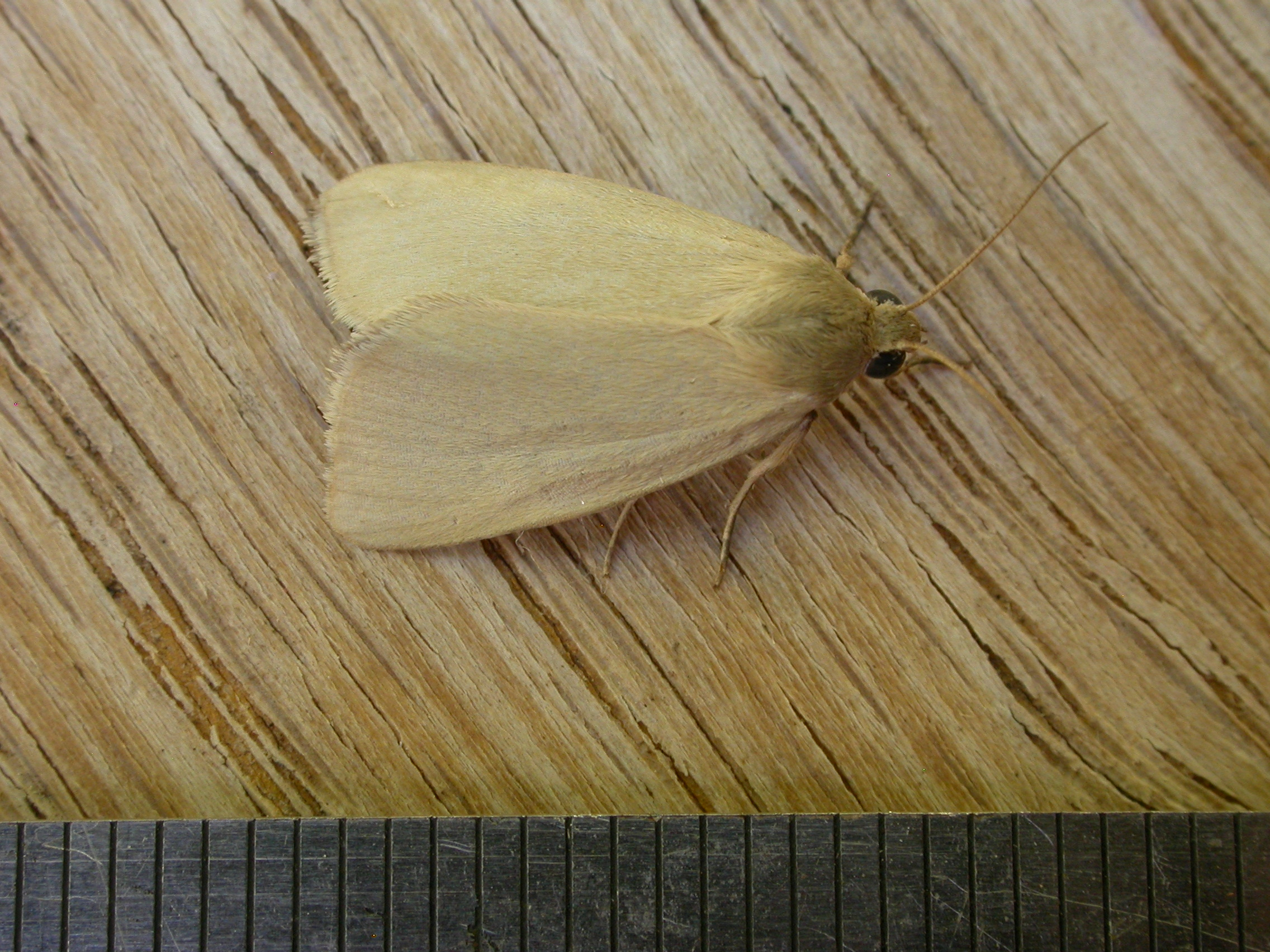

The wingspan is about 30 mm.
