= Ericeia elongata =

Scientific classification
- Kingdom: Animalia
- Phylum: Arthropoda
- Clade: Pancrustacea
- Class: Insecta
- Order: Lepidoptera
- Superfamily: Noctuoidea
- Family: Erebidae
- Genus: Ericeia
- Species: E. elongata

Binomial name
- Ericeia elongata Prout, 1929

Synonyms
- Ericeia acutangula Roepke, 1932; Ericeia elongata fuscipuncta Prout, 1929; Ericeia elongata nauarchia Prout, 1929

Species of moth

Ericeia elongata is a moth in the family Erebidae. It is found from the Indo-Australian tropics to New Guinea and Australia (Queensland). The habitat consists of lowland forests, including heath and alluvial forests.

The larvae possibly feed on Acacia species.

== Taxonomy ==
The species was formerly included in Ericeia inangulata as a synonym.
