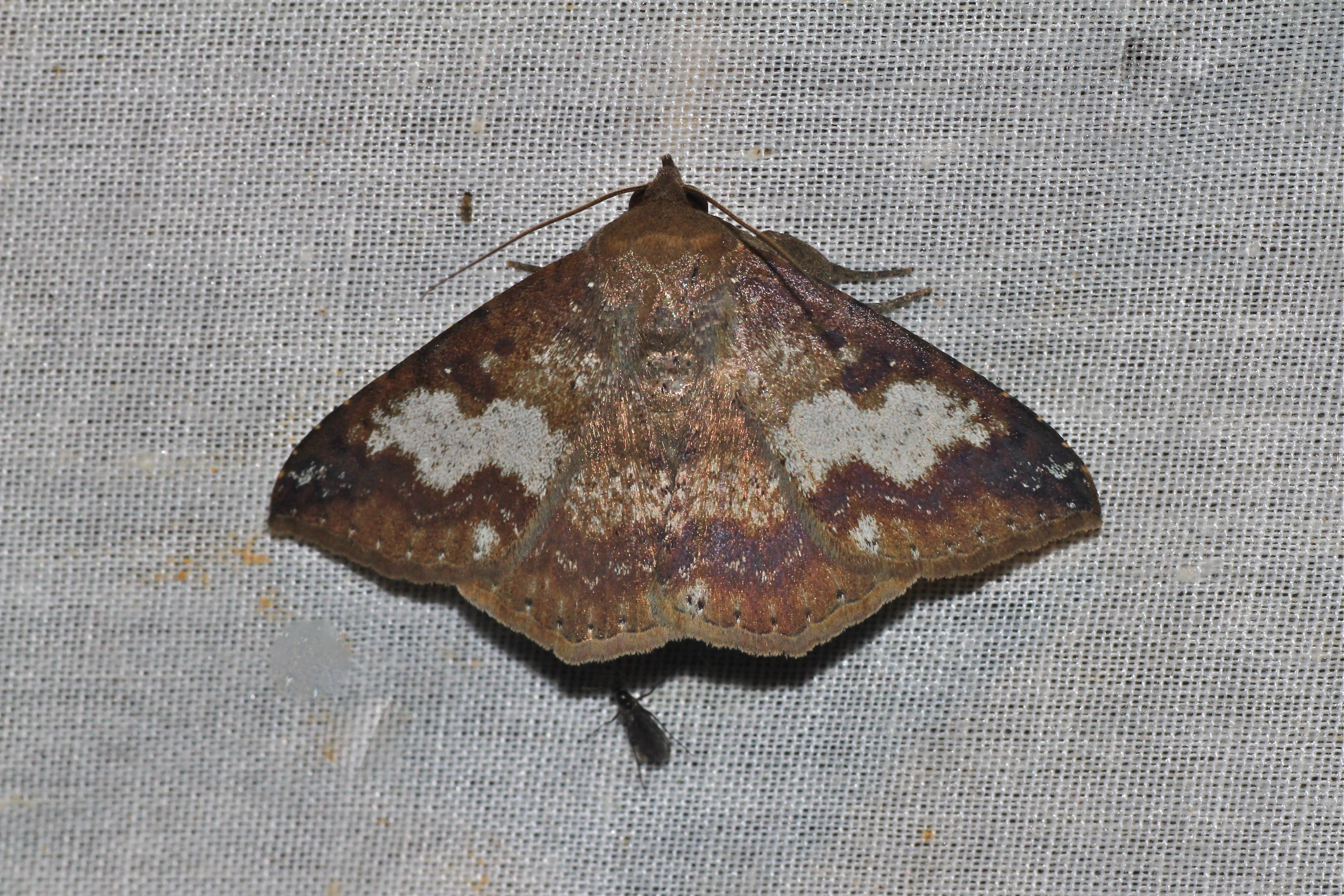

Scientific classification
- Kingdom: Animalia
- Phylum: Arthropoda
- Class: Insecta
- Order: Lepidoptera
- Superfamily: Noctuoidea
- Family: Erebidae
- Genus: Ericeia
- Species: E. amanda

Binomial name
- Ericeia amanda Walker, 1858

Synonyms
- Remigia amanda Walker, 1858; Remigia intracta Walker, 1864; Ericeia intracta

= Ericeia amanda =

Species of moth

Ericeia amanda is a moth in the family Erebidae. It is found on Borneo, Sumatra and Peninsular Malaysia. The original description notes Adelaide, Australia as type locality, but the species is not known from Australia.

== Taxonomy ==
Although Poole placed E. intracta as a synonym of Ericeia inangulata in 1989, it is instead a synonym for E. amanda.
