= Ericeia congregata =

Scientific classification
- Kingdom: Animalia
- Phylum: Arthropoda
- Class: Insecta
- Order: Lepidoptera
- Superfamily: Noctuoidea
- Family: Erebidae
- Genus: Ericeia
- Species: E. congregata

Binomial name
- Ericeia congregata (Walker, 1858)

Synonyms
- Remigia congregata Walker, 1858; Naxia infirma Holland, 1894; Grammodes taedia Felder & Rogenhofer, 1874; Ericeia waterstoni Wiltshire, 1982

Species of moth

Ericeia congregata is a moth in the family Erebidae. It is found in Angola, Cameroon, Cape Verde, the Comoros, the Democratic Republic of Congo, Gabon, Kenya, La Réunion, Madagascar, Mauritania, Mauritius, Sierra Leone, South Africa, Gambia, Uganda, Yemen, Saudi Arabia, India and Sri Lanka.

The larvae feed on Acacia tortilis.
