= Ericeia albangula =

Scientific classification
- Kingdom: Animalia
- Phylum: Arthropoda
- Clade: Pancrustacea
- Class: Insecta
- Order: Lepidoptera
- Superfamily: Noctuoidea
- Family: Erebidae
- Genus: Ericeia
- Species: E. albangula

Binomial name
- Ericeia albangula (Saalmüller, 1880)

Synonyms
- Alamis albangula Saalmüller, 1880; Homoptera terrena Mabille, 1882; Ericeia albangula dodo Viette, 1975

Species of moth

Ericeia albangula is a moth in the family Erebidae. It is found in South Africa, Madagascar, Comoros and La Réunion.
