= Ericeia biplagiella =

Scientific classification
- Kingdom: Animalia
- Phylum: Arthropoda
- Class: Insecta
- Order: Lepidoptera
- Superfamily: Noctuoidea
- Family: Erebidae
- Genus: Ericeia
- Species: E. biplagiella

Binomial name
- Ericeia biplagiella Viette, 1966

Species of moth

Ericeia biplagiella is a moth in the family Erebidae. It is found in northern Madagascar.
