= Ericeia epitheca =

Scientific classification
- Domain: Eukaryota
- Kingdom: Animalia
- Phylum: Arthropoda
- Class: Insecta
- Order: Lepidoptera
- Superfamily: Noctuoidea
- Family: Erebidae
- Genus: Ericeia
- Species: E. epitheca

Binomial name
- Ericeia epitheca C. Swinhoe, 1915

Species of moth

Ericeia epitheca is a moth in the family Erebidae first described by Charles Swinhoe in 1915. It is found on New Guinea, where it has been recorded from Fergusson Island.
