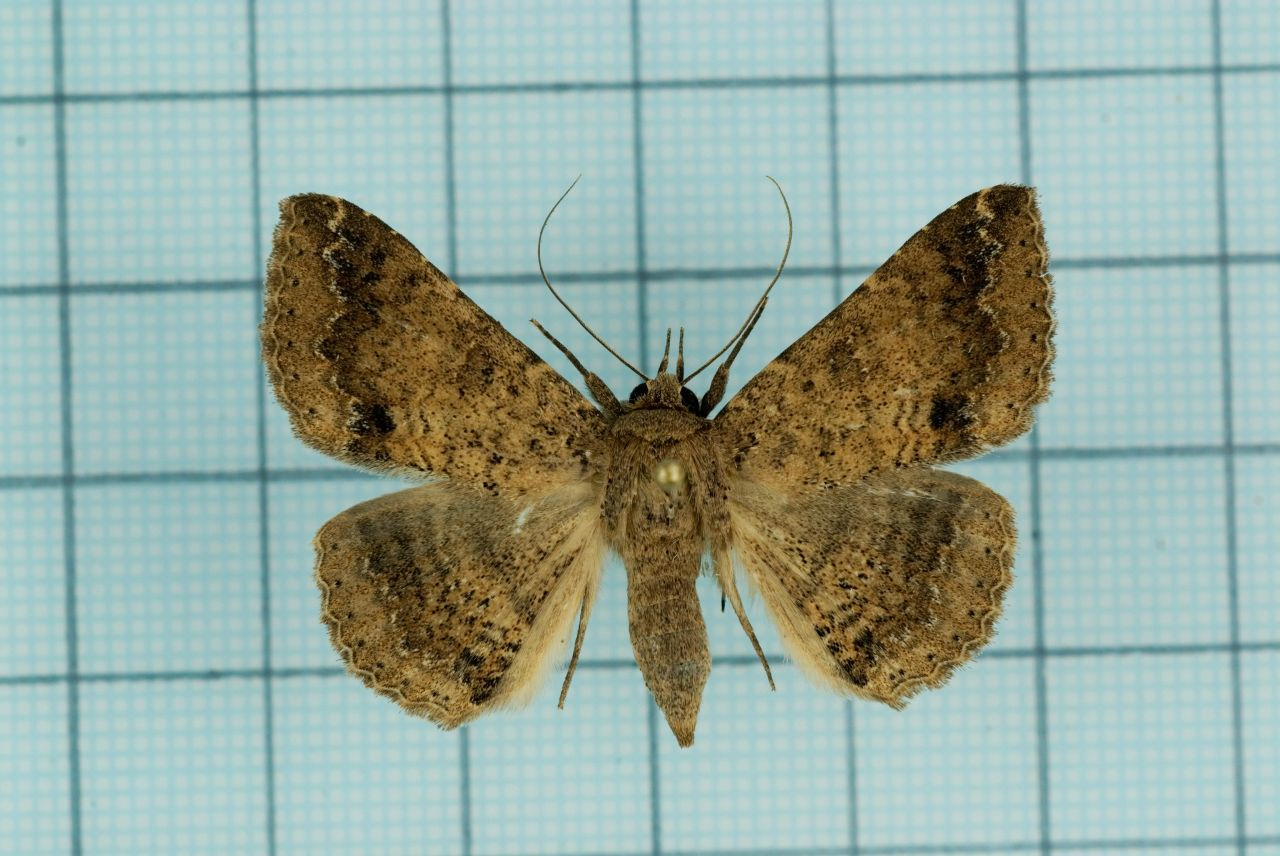

Scientific classification
- Kingdom: Animalia
- Phylum: Arthropoda
- Class: Insecta
- Order: Lepidoptera
- Superfamily: Noctuoidea
- Family: Erebidae
- Genus: Ericeia
- Species: E. pertendens

Binomial name
- Ericeia pertendens (Walker, 1858)

Synonyms
- Remigia pertendens Walker, 1858; Ericeia gonioptila Prout, 1922; Ericeia eurytaenia Prout, 1929; Ericeia occidua Prout, 1929; Ericeia iopolia D. S. Fletcher, 1957

= Ericeia pertendens =

Species of moth

Ericeia pertendens is a moth in the family Erebidae first described by Francis Walker in 1858. It is found from the Indo-Australian tropics to the Solomon Islands.

The wingspan is 37–45 mm.
