= Ericeia dysmorpha =

Scientific classification
- Kingdom: Animalia
- Phylum: Arthropoda
- Clade: Pancrustacea
- Class: Insecta
- Order: Lepidoptera
- Superfamily: Noctuoidea
- Family: Erebidae
- Genus: Ericeia
- Species: E. dysmorpha

Binomial name
- Ericeia dysmorpha Prout, 1929

Species of moth

Ericeia dysmorpha is a moth in the family Erebidae. It is found on the Solomon Islands.
