= Ericeia rhanteria =

Scientific classification
- Domain: Eukaryota
- Kingdom: Animalia
- Phylum: Arthropoda
- Class: Insecta
- Order: Lepidoptera
- Superfamily: Noctuoidea
- Family: Erebidae
- Genus: Ericeia
- Species: E. rhanteria

Binomial name
- Ericeia rhanteria Bethune-Baker, 1914

Synonyms
- Ericeia spodiaplaca Bethune-Baker, 1914

Species of moth

Ericeia rhanteria is a moth in the family Erebidae. It is found in New Guinea.
