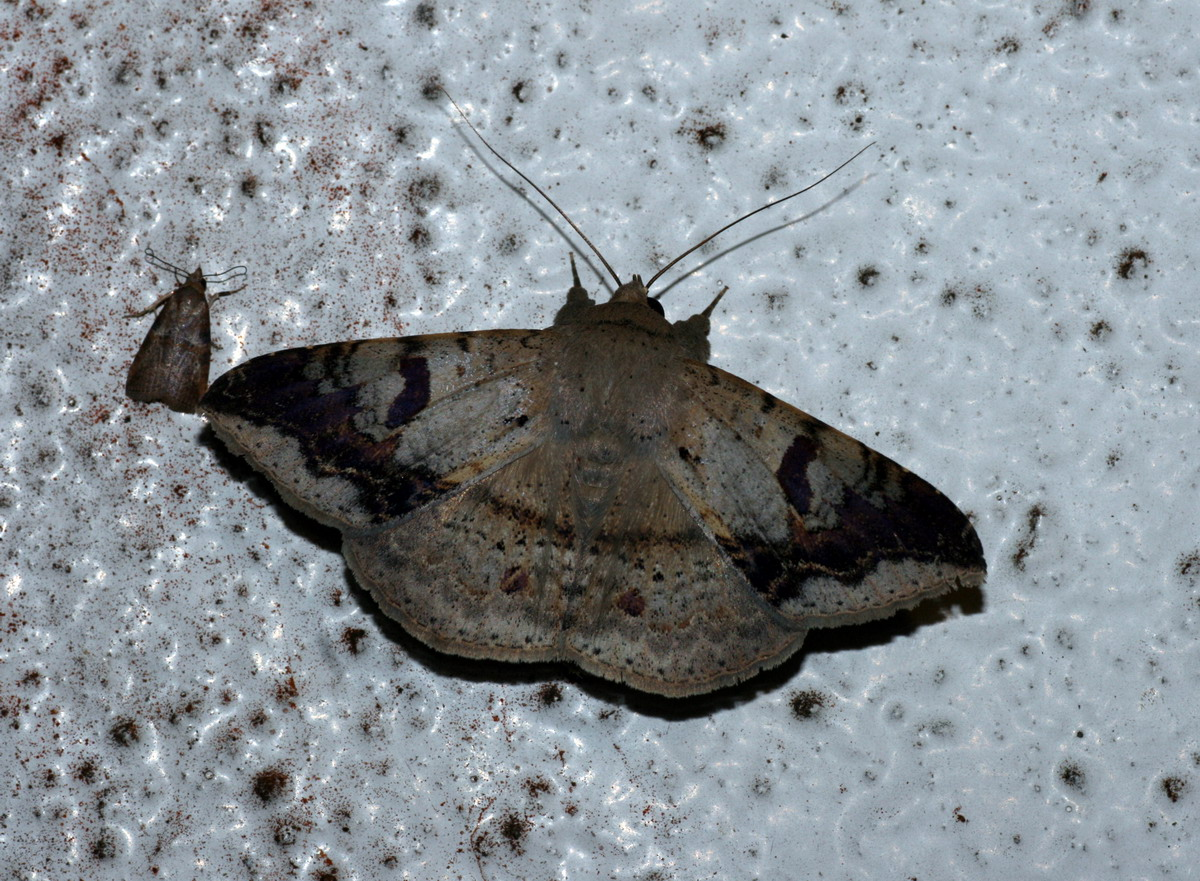

Scientific classification
- Kingdom: Animalia
- Phylum: Arthropoda
- Class: Insecta
- Order: Lepidoptera
- Superfamily: Noctuoidea
- Family: Erebidae
- Genus: Ericeia
- Species: E. eriophora

Binomial name
- Ericeia eriophora (Guenée, 1852)

Synonyms
- Hulodes eriophora Guenée, 1852; Ophisma deficiens Walker, 1858; Remigia perfidiosa Walker, 1858; Hypopyra apicalis Walker, [1863]

= Ericeia eriophora =

Species of moth

Ericeia eriophora is a moth in the family Erebidae. It is found from the Oriental tropics to the Philippines and Sulawesi.

Adults exhibit sexual dimorphism, with a broadly darkened submarginal zone in males, while this darkening is limited to the apical area in females, which are also browner.
