= Ericeia korintjiensis =

Scientific classification
- Kingdom: Animalia
- Phylum: Arthropoda
- Clade: Pancrustacea
- Class: Insecta
- Order: Lepidoptera
- Superfamily: Noctuoidea
- Family: Erebidae
- Genus: Ericeia
- Species: E. korintjiensis

Binomial name
- Ericeia korintjiensis Prout, 1928

Species of moth

Ericeia korintjiensis is a moth in the family Erebidae. It is found on Sumatra, Java and Borneo. The habitat consists of forested areas up to altitudes of about 1,790 meters.
