= Ericeia amplipennis =

Scientific classification
- Kingdom: Animalia
- Phylum: Arthropoda
- Clade: Pancrustacea
- Class: Insecta
- Order: Lepidoptera
- Superfamily: Noctuoidea
- Family: Erebidae
- Genus: Ericeia
- Species: E. amplipennis

Binomial name
- Ericeia amplipennis Prout, 1922

Species of moth

Ericeia amplipennis is a moth in the family Erebidae. It is found in Indonesia (Seram).
