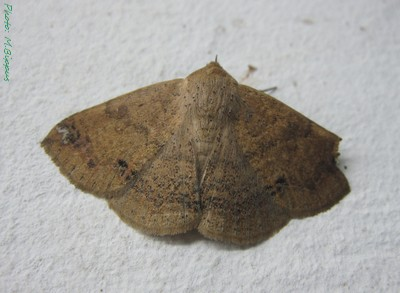
- Ericeia lituraria

Scientific classification
- Kingdom: Animalia
- Phylum: Arthropoda
- Class: Insecta
- Order: Lepidoptera
- Superfamily: Noctuoidea
- Family: Erebidae
- Tribe: Hulodini
- Genus: Ericeia; Walker, [1858]

Synonyms
- Girpa Walker, 1858; Villosa Koch, 1865

= Ericeia =

Genus of moths

Ericeia is a genus of moths in the family Erebidae. The genus was erected by Francis Walker in 1858.

== Species ==
- Ericeia albangula (Saalmüller, 1880)
- Ericeia amanda (Walker, 1858)
- Ericeia amplipennis Prout, 1922
- Ericeia biplagiella Viette, 1966
- Ericeia brunneistriga (Bethune-Baker, 1906)
- Ericeia brunnescens (Snellen, 1880)
- Ericeia canipuncta Prout, 1929
- Ericeia congregata (Walker, 1858)
- Ericeia congressa (Walker, 1858)
- Ericeia dysmorpha Prout, 1929
- Ericeia elongata Prout, 1929
- Ericeia epitheca Swinhoe, 1915
- Ericeia eriophora (Guenee, 1852)
- Ericeia fraterna (Moore, 1885)
- Ericeia goniosema Hampson, 1922
- Ericeia hirsutitarsus Holloway, 1977
- Ericeia inangulata Guenée, 1852
- Ericeia korintjiensis Prout, 1928
- Ericeia leichardtii (Koch, 1865)
- Ericeia lituraria (Saalmüller, 1880)
- Ericeia pallidula Prout, 1929
- Ericeia pertendens Walker, 1858
- Ericeia plaesiodes Turner, 1932
- Ericeia rectifascia Prout, 1928
- Ericeia rectimargo Prout, 1929
- Ericeia rhanteria Bethune-Baker, 1914
- Ericeia setosipedes Bethune-Baker, 1914
- Ericeia sobria Walker, [1858]
- Ericeia subsignata Walker, [1858]

== Former species ==
- Ericeia aliena (Walker, 1858)
- Ericeia certilinea Prout, 1929
- Ericeia euryptera Prout, 1929
- Ericeia intextilia (Schultze, 1908)
- Ericeia waterstoni Wiltshire, 1982
