= Ericeia rectimargo =

Scientific classification
- Kingdom: Animalia
- Phylum: Arthropoda
- Clade: Pancrustacea
- Class: Insecta
- Order: Lepidoptera
- Superfamily: Noctuoidea
- Family: Erebidae
- Genus: Ericeia
- Species: E. rectimargo

Binomial name
- Ericeia rectimargo Prout, 1929

Species of moth

Ericeia rectimargo is a moth in the family Erebidae. It is found on New Guinea.
