= Ericeia hirsutitarsus =

Scientific classification
- Kingdom: Animalia
- Phylum: Arthropoda
- Clade: Pancrustacea
- Class: Insecta
- Order: Lepidoptera
- Superfamily: Noctuoidea
- Family: Erebidae
- Genus: Ericeia
- Species: E. hirsutitarsus

Binomial name
- Ericeia hirsutitarsus Holloway, 1977

Species of moth

Ericeia hirsutitarsus is a moth in the family Erebidae. It is found on Norfolk Island, New Caledonia, Vanuatu, the New Hebrides and the Loyalty Islands.

== Subspecies ==
- Ericeia hirsutitarsis hirsutitarsis
- Ericeia hirsutitarsis robinsoni Holloway, 1977 (Vanuatu, New Hebrides)
