= Ericeia brunneistriga =

Scientific classification
- Domain: Eukaryota
- Kingdom: Animalia
- Phylum: Arthropoda
- Class: Insecta
- Order: Lepidoptera
- Superfamily: Noctuoidea
- Family: Erebidae
- Genus: Ericeia
- Species: E. brunneistriga

Binomial name
- Ericeia brunneistriga (Bethune-Baker, 1906)

Synonyms
- Polydesma brunneistriga Bethune-Baker, 1906

Species of moth

Ericeia brunneistriga is a moth in the family Erebidae. It is found in New Guinea.
