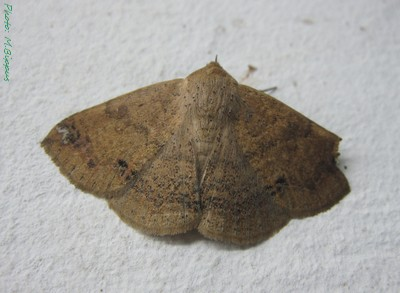
- Ericeia lituraria (female)

Scientific classification
- Kingdom: Animalia
- Phylum: Arthropoda
- Clade: Pancrustacea
- Class: Insecta
- Order: Lepidoptera
- Superfamily: Noctuoidea
- Family: Erebidae
- Genus: Ericeia
- Species: E. lituraria

Binomial name
- Ericeia lituraria (Saalmüller, 1880)

Synonyms
- Alamis lituraria Saalmüller, 1880

= Ericeia lituraria =

Species of moth

Ericeia lituraria is a moth in the family Erebidae. It is found in central and southern Africa and on the islands of the Indian Ocean.

The wingspan is 25–30 mm.
