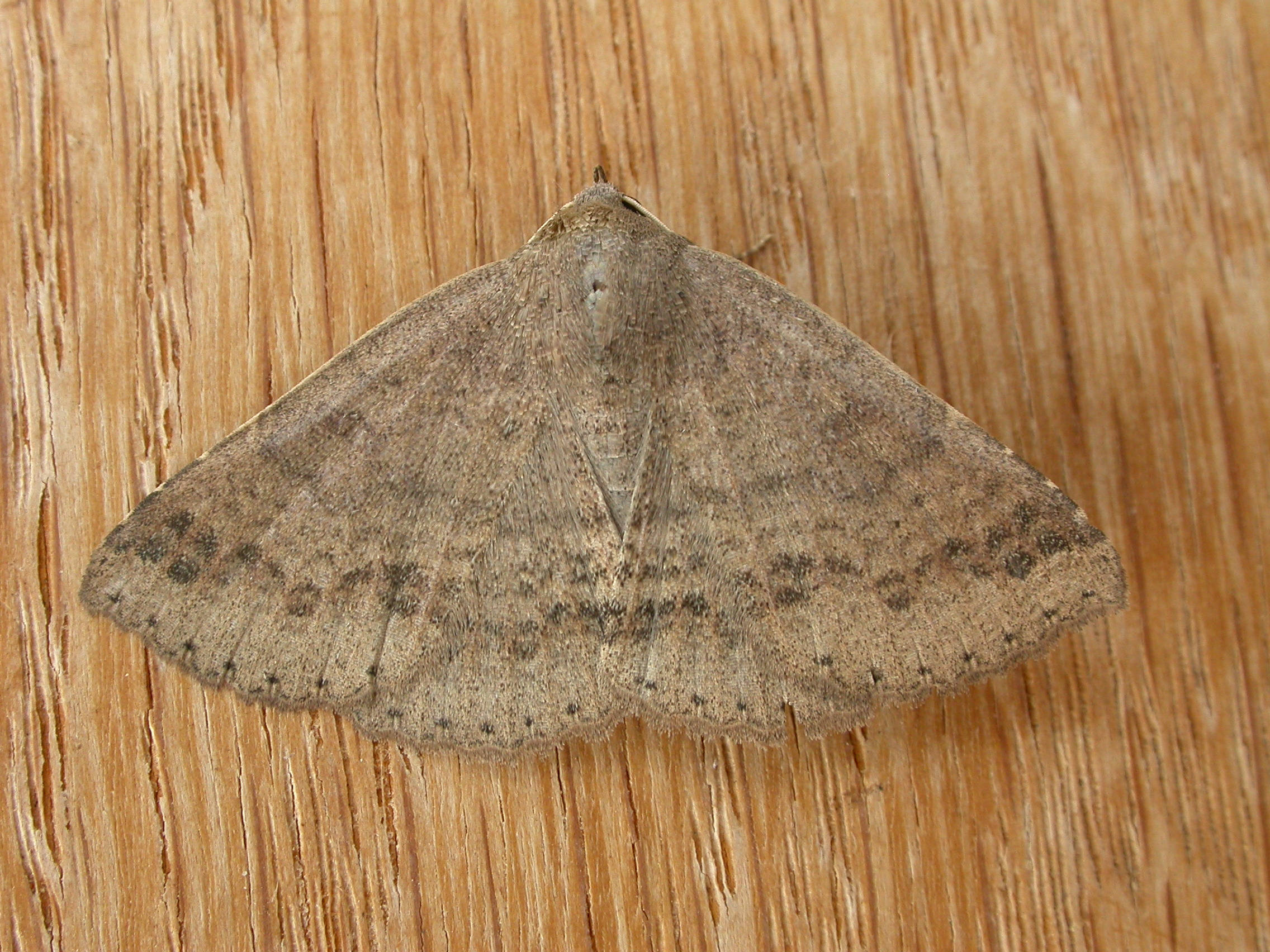

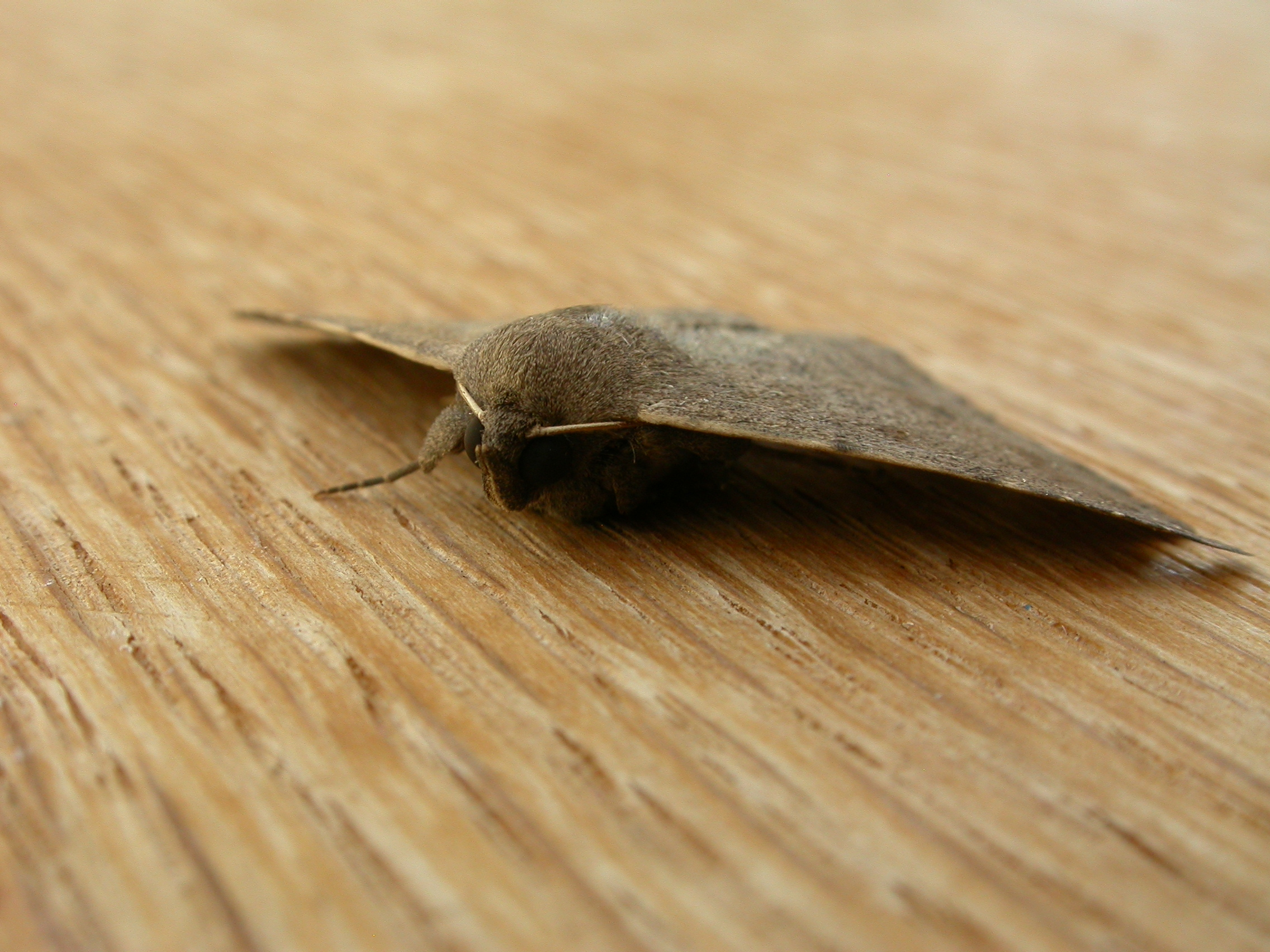

Scientific classification
- Kingdom: Animalia
- Phylum: Arthropoda
- Clade: Pancrustacea
- Class: Insecta
- Order: Lepidoptera
- Superfamily: Noctuoidea
- Family: Erebidae
- Genus: Ericeia
- Species: E. subsignata

Binomial name
- Ericeia subsignata (Walker, 1858)

Synonyms
- Diatenes subsignata Walker, 1858

= Ericeia subsignata =

Species of moth

Ericeia subsignata is a moth of the family Erebidae. It is known from Australia, including the Australian Capital Territory.
