= Ericeia setosipedes =

Scientific classification
- Domain: Eukaryota
- Kingdom: Animalia
- Phylum: Arthropoda
- Class: Insecta
- Order: Lepidoptera
- Superfamily: Noctuoidea
- Family: Erebidae
- Genus: Ericeia
- Species: E. setosipedes

Binomial name
- Ericeia setosipedes Bethune-Baker, 1914

Species of moth

Ericeia setosipedes is a moth in the family Erebidae. It is found in New Guinea.
