= Ericeia congressa =

Scientific classification
- Kingdom: Animalia
- Phylum: Arthropoda
- Clade: Pancrustacea
- Class: Insecta
- Order: Lepidoptera
- Superfamily: Noctuoidea
- Family: Erebidae
- Genus: Ericeia
- Species: E. congressa

Binomial name
- Ericeia congressa (Walker, 1858)

Synonyms
- Remigia congressa Walker, 1858; Hulodes sandii Guenée, 1862

Species of moth

Ericeia congressa is a moth in the family Erebidae. It is known to be found in South Africa, Madagascar, Mauritius and Réunion. It was described by Francis Walker in 1858.

The wingspan was described as 18 lines (38 mm) and the body length as 8 lines (18 mm).

In Walker's List of the Specimens of Lepidopterous Insects in the Collection of the British Museum, he wrote:

Remigia congressa

Male. Cinereous, speckled with black. Hind tarsi densely pilose. Wings with the usual lines black, slender, incomplete, much denticulated; a diffuse bronish band, including the whitish denticulated submarignal line; a row of submarginal black points, and a slender black interrupted marginal line. Fore wings acute, hardly subfalcate; a dark cinereous apical patch, four white costal subapical points; orbicular forming a brown dot; reniform brownish, subquadrate. Length of the body 8 lines; of the wings 18 lines.

a, b. Port Natal. From Gueinzius' collection.

c. Ashanti. From Wesleyan Missionary Society's collection.
