= Ericeia plaesiodes =

Scientific classification
- Kingdom: Animalia
- Phylum: Arthropoda
- Class: Insecta
- Order: Lepidoptera
- Superfamily: Noctuoidea
- Family: Erebidae
- Genus: Ericeia
- Species: E. plaesiodes

Binomial name
- Ericeia plaesiodes Turner, 1932

Species of moth

Ericeia plaesiodes is a moth in the family Erebidae. It is found in Australia, where it has been recorded from Queensland, the Northern Territory and New South Wales.
