= Ericeia goniosema =

Scientific classification
- Kingdom: Animalia
- Phylum: Arthropoda
- Class: Insecta
- Order: Lepidoptera
- Superfamily: Noctuoidea
- Family: Erebidae
- Genus: Ericeia
- Species: E. goniosema

Binomial name
- Ericeia goniosema Hampson, 1922

Species of moth

Ericeia goniosema is a moth in the family Erebidae. It is found in New Guinea and Australia, where it has been recorded from Queensland.

The wingspan is about 40 mm. This wings are variably patterned brown.
