= Ericeia brunnescens =

Scientific classification
- Kingdom: Animalia
- Phylum: Arthropoda
- Class: Insecta
- Order: Lepidoptera
- Superfamily: Noctuoidea
- Family: Erebidae
- Genus: Ericeia
- Species: E. brunnescens

Binomial name
- Ericeia brunnescens (Snellen, 1880)

Synonyms
- Alamis brunnescens Snellen, 1880

Species of moth

Ericeia brunnescens is a moth in the family Erebidae. It is found on Borneo, Sumatra and Java.
