= Ericeia leichardtii =

Scientific classification
- Kingdom: Animalia
- Phylum: Arthropoda
- Class: Insecta
- Order: Lepidoptera
- Superfamily: Noctuoidea
- Family: Erebidae
- Genus: Ericeia
- Species: E. leichardtii

Binomial name
- Ericeia leichardtii (Koch, 1865)

Synonyms
- Villosa leichardtii Koch, 1865; Girpa carnea Butler, 1886; Girpa maxima Butler, 1886

Species of moth

Ericeia leichardtii is a moth in the family Erebidae. It is found on Fiji, Tonga, the Loyalty Islands Samoa and in northern Australia.
