= Ericeia sobria =

Scientific classification
- Kingdom: Animalia
- Phylum: Arthropoda
- Class: Insecta
- Order: Lepidoptera
- Superfamily: Noctuoidea
- Family: Erebidae
- Genus: Ericeia
- Species: E. sobria

Binomial name
- Ericeia sobria Walker, 1858

Synonyms
- Girpa aliena Walker, 1858; Ericeia pampoecila Bethune-Baker, 1914; Ophisma statina Möschler, 1884; Ericeia euryptera Prout, 1929

Species of moth

Ericeia sobria is a moth in the family Erebidae. It is found in Kenya, South Africa (Eastern Cape), Gambia, Borneo, New Guinea and Australia, where it has been recorded from Queensland and New South Wales.

The wingspan is about 50 millimetres (2.0 in). Adults are variable. The wings are patterned brown with a darker vague submarginal band.
