= Ericeia fraterna =

Scientific classification
- Kingdom: Animalia
- Phylum: Arthropoda
- Class: Insecta
- Order: Lepidoptera
- Superfamily: Noctuoidea
- Family: Erebidae
- Genus: Ericeia
- Species: E. fraterna

Binomial name
- Ericeia fraterna (Moore, 1885)

Synonyms
- Girpa fraterna Moore, 1885

Species of moth

Ericeia fraterna is a moth in the family Erebidae. It is found in China, India, Burma, Sri Lanka, the Philippines (Luzon) and Indonesia (Java, Timor).
