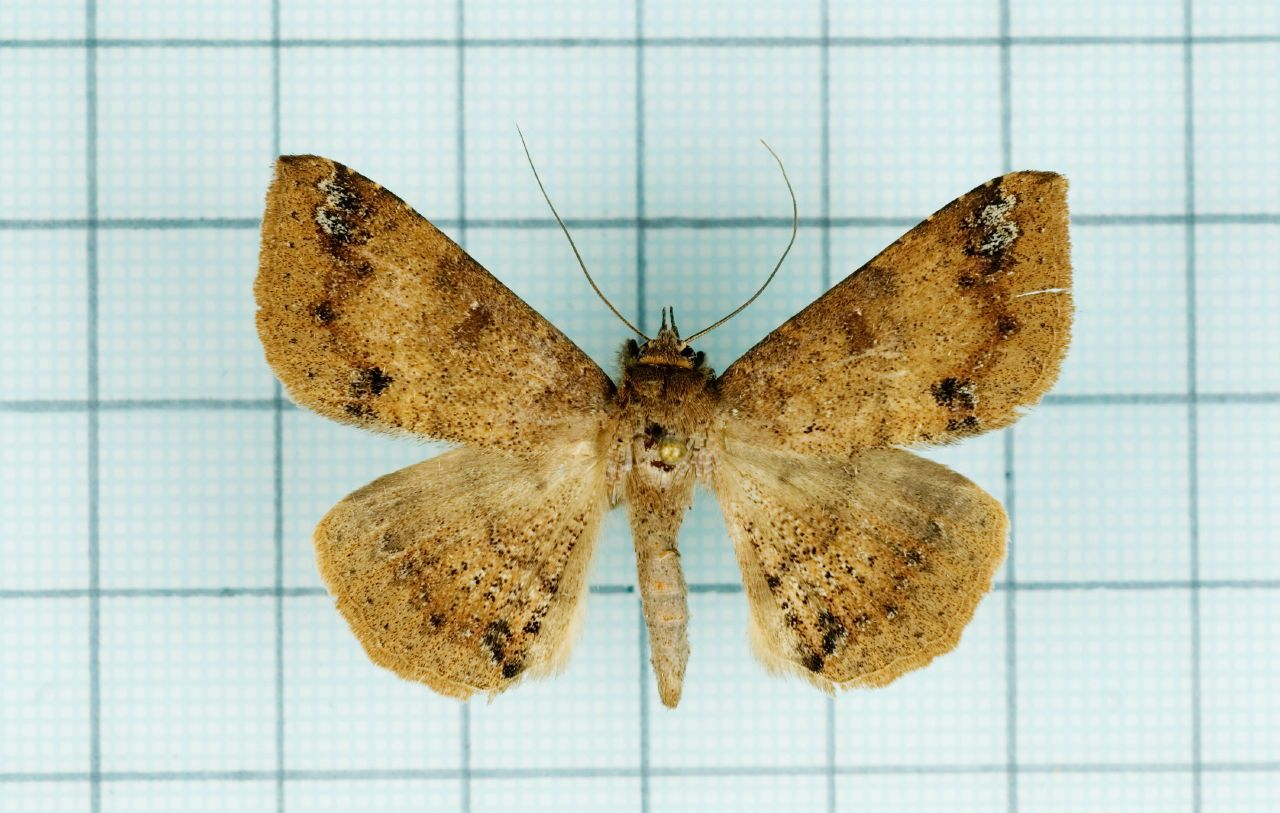

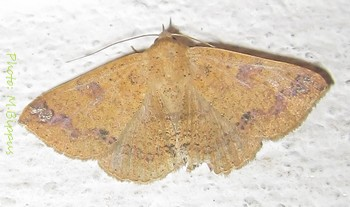

Scientific classification
- Kingdom: Animalia
- Phylum: Arthropoda
- Class: Insecta
- Order: Lepidoptera
- Superfamily: Noctuoidea
- Family: Erebidae
- Genus: Ericeia
- Species: E. inangulata

Binomial name
- Ericeia inangulata (Guenée, 1852)

Synonyms
- Hulodes inangulata Guenée, 1852; Remigia optativa Walker, 1858; Remigia optatura Walker, 1858; Remigia zeta Walker, 1864; Remigia comitata Walker, 1865; Hulodes umbrosa Walker, 1869; Alamis subcinerea Snellen, 1880; Remigia intextilia Schultze, 1908; Ericeia levuensis Prout, 1929; Ericeia certilinea Prout, 1929

= Ericeia inangulata =

Sober tabby

Species of moth

Ericeia inangulata, the sober tabby, is a moth in the family Erebidae. The species was first described by Achille Guenée in 1852. It is found in the Indo-Australian tropics of China, India, Sri Lanka, Myanmar, and the Marianas and Carolines, Fiji, Vanuatu, New Caledonia and Samoa.

== Description ==
The wingspan is 47–48 mm. Adults are sexually dimorphic and highly variable in color. Palpi with longer third joint. Hindlegs of male tufted with long hair to the extremity of the tarsi. Mid tibia of male with large masses of flocculent hair contained in a fold. Body purplish grey, ochreous, reddish or fuscous brown with more or less irrorated with fuscous. Forewings with sub-basal, antemedial, medial, postmedial and sub-marginal indistinct sinuous dark lines. The minute orbicular and large reniform spots are indistinct. There is an almost marginal dark specks series. These markings may be obsolete or fairly prominent. Each line may be double and consist of disjoined striga or lunules. The area inside the sub-marginal and medial lines is fuscous suffused, or ferrous. Some forms have elongate or prominent reniform. A grey apical patch and a dark spot on sub-marginal line above inner margin found in ochreous forms. Hindwings with indistinct medial line with crenulate line beyond it. A waved submarginal line and almost marginal dark specks series can be seen.

The larvae feed on various plants, including Acacia mearnsii, Scutia myrtina, Cassia fistula, Cassia javanica, Albizia, Cassia, Dalbergia, Mimosa, Paraserianthes, Senna, Xylia, Adiantum, Lagerstroemia and Citrus species.

== Subspecies ==
- Ericeia inangulata inangulata
- Ericeia inangulata levuensis (Prout, 1929) (Fiji, Vanuatu, New Caledonia and Samoa)
