= D. spectabilis =

D. spectabilis may refer to:

- Dipodomys spectabilis, the banner-tailed kangaroo rat, a rodent species
- Discopus spectabilis, a beetle species
- Donuca spectabilis, a moth species
- Dryotriorchis spectabilis, the Congo serpent eagle, a bird species
