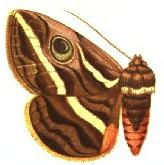

Scientific classification
- Domain: Eukaryota
- Kingdom: Animalia
- Phylum: Arthropoda
- Class: Insecta
- Order: Lepidoptera
- Superfamily: Noctuoidea
- Family: Noctuidae
- Genus: Donuca
- Species: D. rubropicta

Binomial name
- Donuca rubropicta (Butler, 1874)

Synonyms
- Calliodes rubropicta Butler, 1874

= Donuca rubropicta =

Species of moth

Donuca rubropicta is a species of moth of the family Noctuidae first described by Arthur Gardiner Butler in 1874. It is found in Australia in south-eastern Queensland and north-east New South Wales.

The wingspan is about 50 mm.
