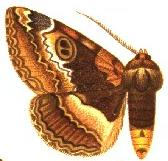

Scientific classification
- Domain: Eukaryota
- Kingdom: Animalia
- Phylum: Arthropoda
- Class: Insecta
- Order: Lepidoptera
- Superfamily: Noctuoidea
- Family: Noctuidae
- Genus: Donuca
- Species: D. xanthopyga

Binomial name
- Donuca xanthopyga (Turner, 1909)

Synonyms
- Calliodes xanthopyga Turner, 1909

= Donuca xanthopyga =

Species of moth

Donuca xanthopyga is a species of moth of the family Noctuidae first described by Alfred Jefferis Turner in 1909. It is found in the Australian state of Queensland.
