= Donuca lanipes =

Scientific classification
- Domain: Eukaryota
- Kingdom: Animalia
- Phylum: Arthropoda
- Class: Insecta
- Order: Lepidoptera
- Superfamily: Noctuoidea
- Family: Noctuidae
- Genus: Donuca
- Species: D. lanipes

Binomial name
- Donuca lanipes (Butler, 1877)

Synonyms
- Calliodes lanipes Butler, 1877

Species of moth

Donuca lanipes is a species of moth of the family Noctuidae first described by Arthur Gardiner Butler in 1877. It is found in the north-eastern quarter of Australia.

The wingspan is about 60 mm.
