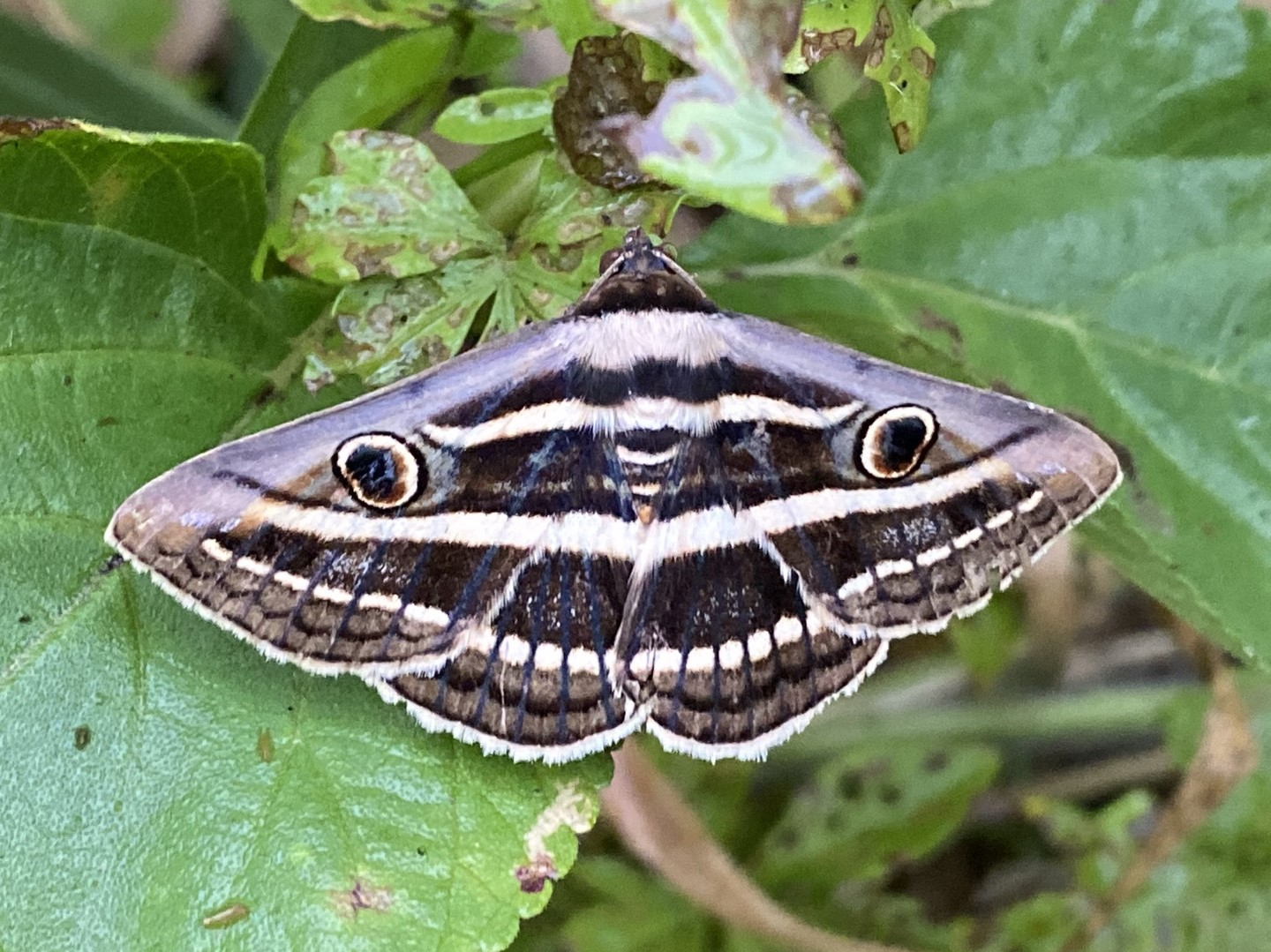

Scientific classification
- Kingdom: Animalia
- Phylum: Arthropoda
- Class: Insecta
- Order: Lepidoptera
- Superfamily: Noctuoidea
- Family: Noctuidae
- Genus: Donuca
- Species: D. orbigera

Binomial name
- Donuca orbigera (Guenée, 1852)

Synonyms
- Calliodes orbigera Guenée, 1852

= Donuca orbigera =

Species of moth

Donuca orbigera is a species of moth of the family Noctuidae first described by Achille Guenée in 1852. It is found in the northern half of Australia.

The wingspan is about 50 mm.
