= Discopus antennatus =

Scientific classification
- Domain: Eukaryota
- Kingdom: Animalia
- Phylum: Arthropoda
- Class: Insecta
- Order: Coleoptera
- Suborder: Polyphaga
- Infraorder: Cucujiformia
- Family: Cerambycidae
- Genus: Discopus
- Species: D. antennatus

Binomial name
- Discopus antennatus (Guérin-Méneville, 1855)

Species of beetle

Discopus antennatus is a species of beetle in the family Cerambycidae. It was described by Félix Édouard Guérin-Méneville in 1855.
