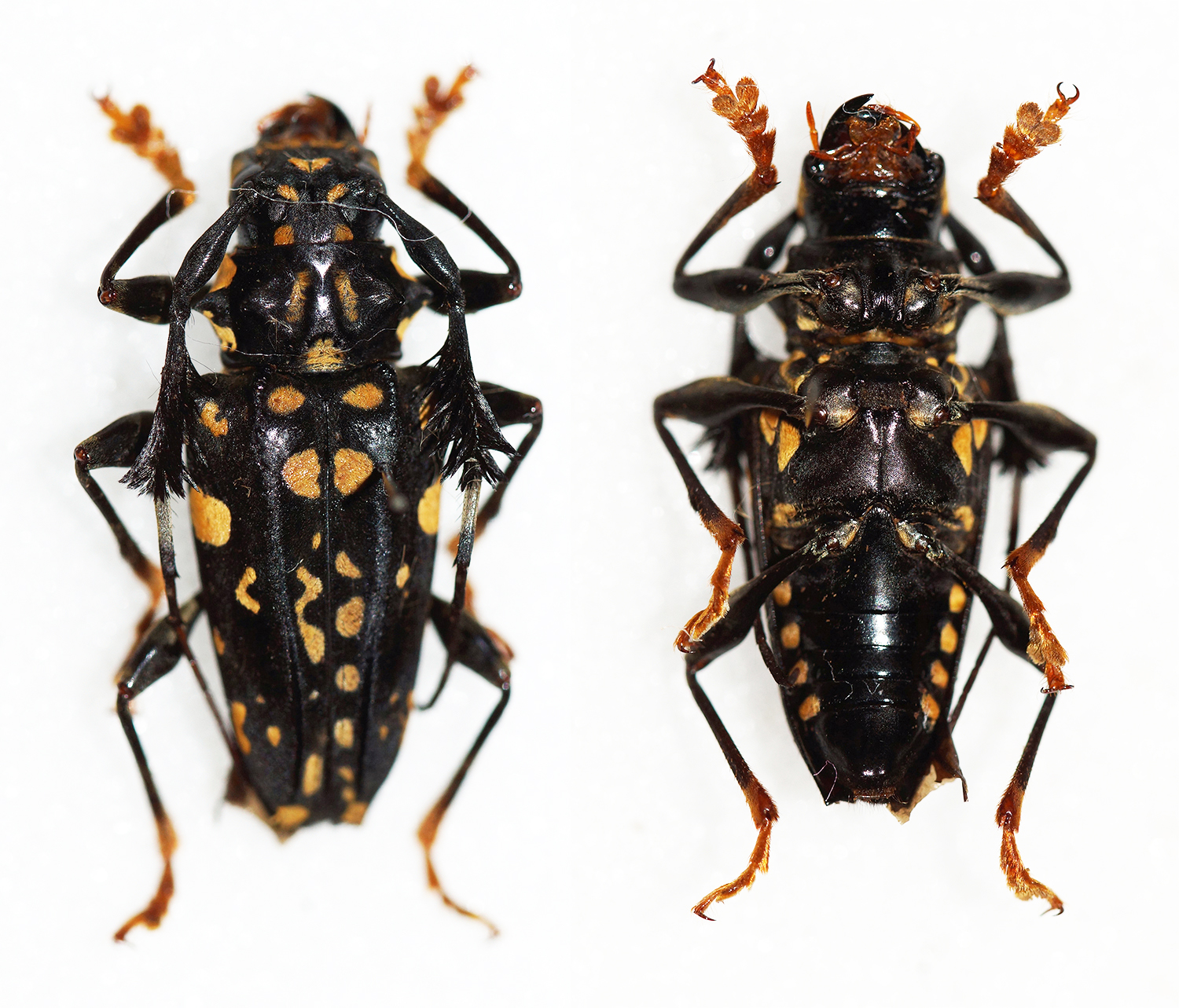
- Discopus spectabilis

Scientific classification
- Domain: Eukaryota
- Kingdom: Animalia
- Phylum: Arthropoda
- Class: Insecta
- Order: Coleoptera
- Suborder: Polyphaga
- Infraorder: Cucujiformia
- Family: Cerambycidae
- Tribe: Acanthoderini
- Genus: Discopus

= Discopus =

Genus of beetles

Discopus is a genus of beetles in the family Cerambycidae, containing the following species:

- Discopus antennatus (Guérin-Méneville, 1855)
- Discopus buckleyi Bates, 1880
- Discopus comes Bates, 1880
- Discopus eques Bates, 1880
- Discopus patricius Bates, 1880
- Discopus princeps Bates, 1880
- Discopus spectabilis (Bates, 1861)
