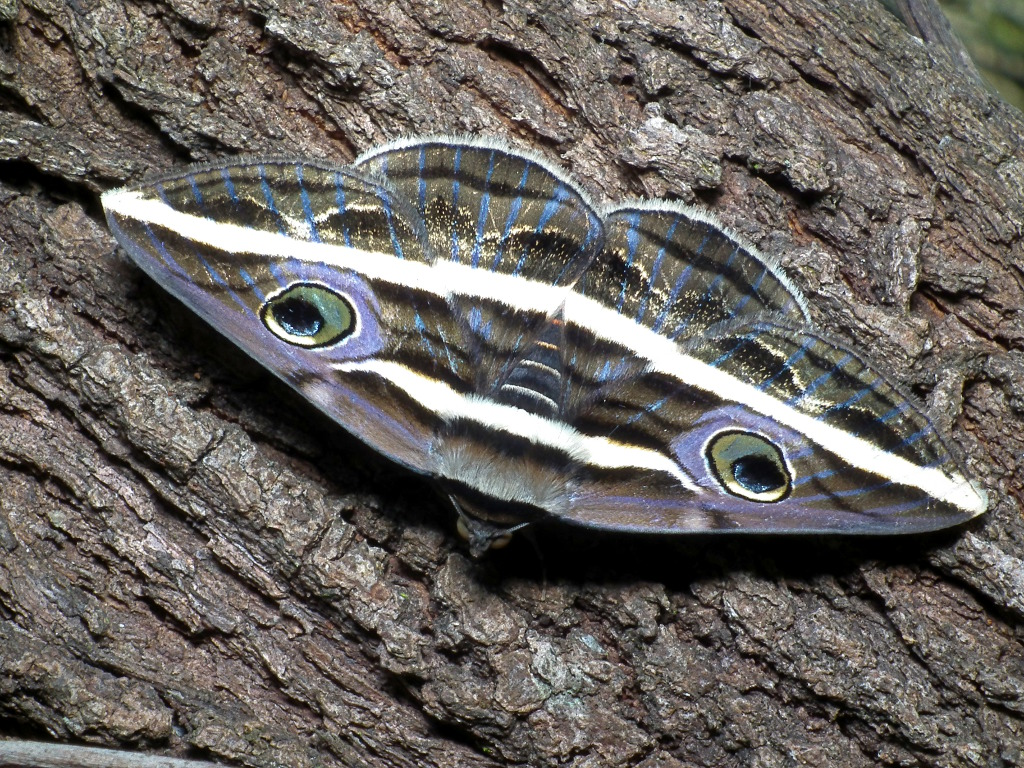

Scientific classification
- Kingdom: Animalia
- Phylum: Arthropoda
- Class: Insecta
- Order: Lepidoptera
- Superfamily: Noctuoidea
- Family: Noctuidae
- Genus: Donuca; Walker, 1865

Synonyms
- Eucyclomma Butler, 1893

= Donuca =

Genus of moths

Donuca is a genus of moths of the family Noctuidae. The genus was erected by Francis Walker in 1865.

== Species ==
- Donuca castalia (Fabricius, 1775)
- Donuca lanipes (Butler, 1877)
- Donuca orbigera (Guenée, 1852)
- Donuca rubropicta (Butler, 1874)
- Donuca spectabilis Walker, 1865
- Donuca xanthopyga (Turner, 1909)
