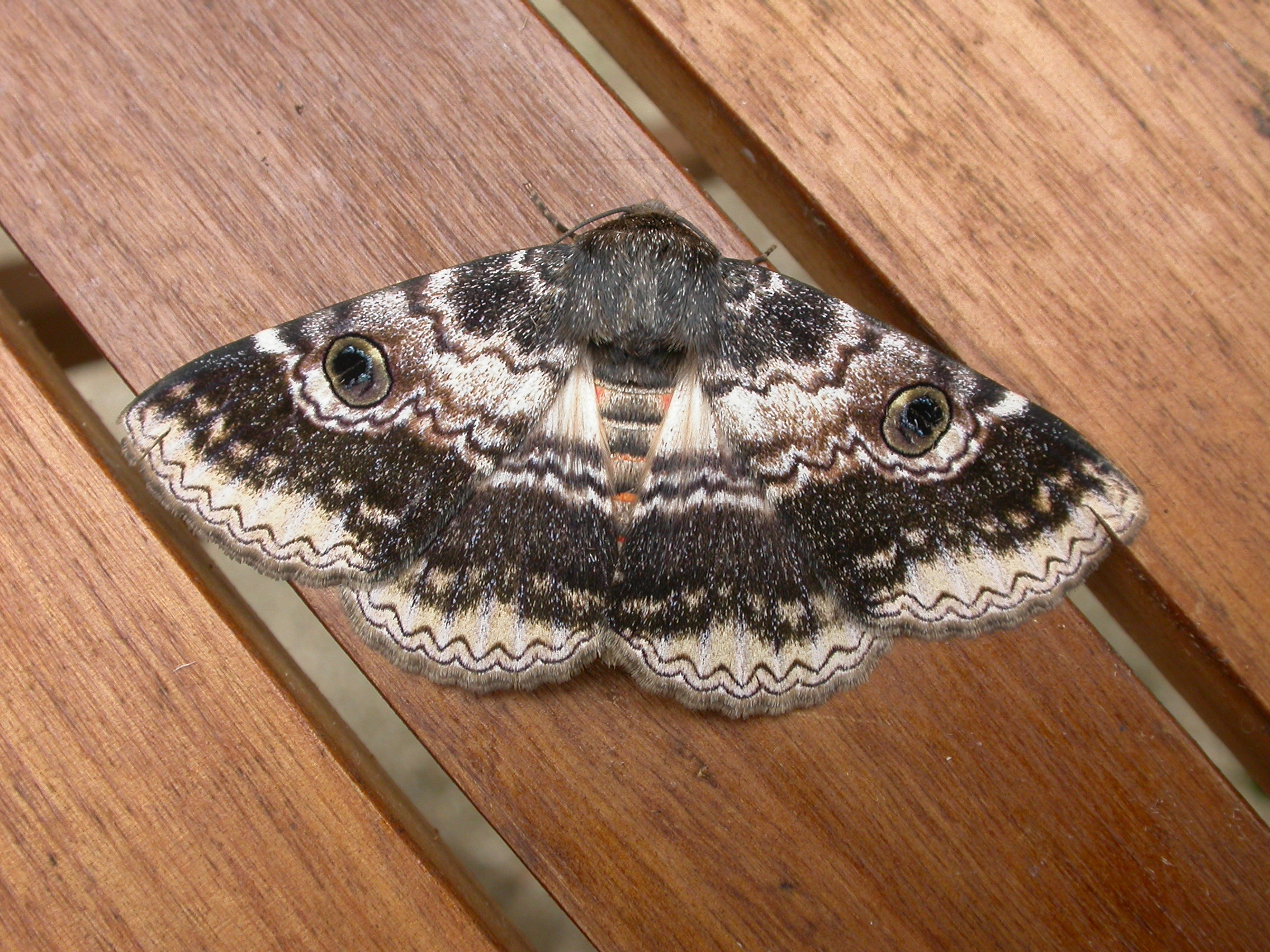

Scientific classification
- Kingdom: Animalia
- Phylum: Arthropoda
- Class: Insecta
- Order: Lepidoptera
- Superfamily: Noctuoidea
- Family: Noctuidae
- Genus: Donuca
- Species: D. castalia

Binomial name
- Donuca castalia (Fabricius, 1775)

Synonyms
- Bombyx castalia Fabricius, 1775; Calliodes saturatior Walker, 1858

= Donuca castalia =

Brown white banded noctuid

Species of moth

Donuca castalia, the brown white banded noctuid, is a moth of the family Erebidae. The species was first described by Johan Christian Fabricius in 1775. It is found in Queensland.

The wingspan is about 60 mm.
