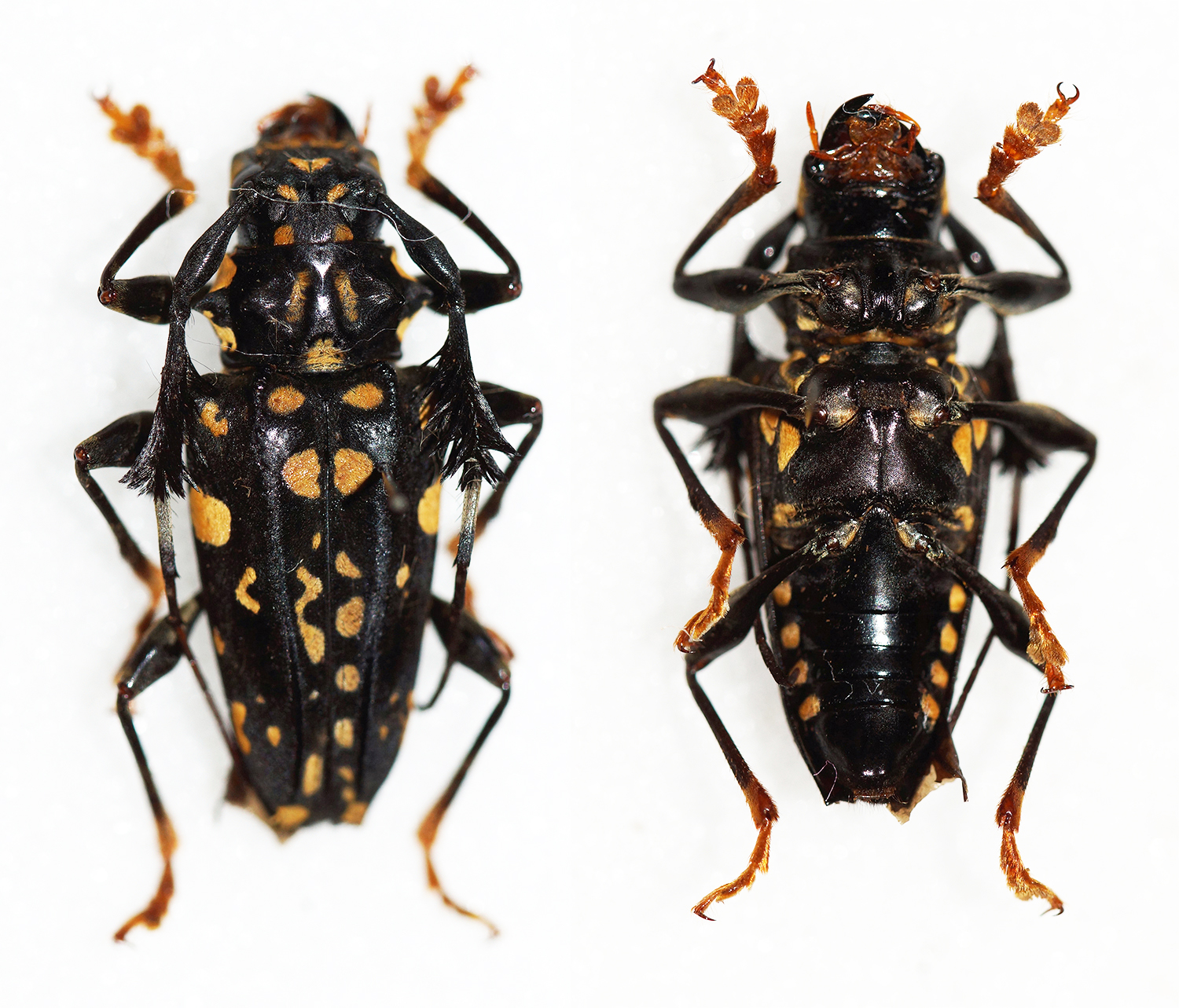

Scientific classification
- Domain: Eukaryota
- Kingdom: Animalia
- Phylum: Arthropoda
- Class: Insecta
- Order: Coleoptera
- Suborder: Polyphaga
- Infraorder: Cucujiformia
- Family: Cerambycidae
- Genus: Discopus
- Species: D. spectabilis

Binomial name
- Discopus spectabilis (Bates, 1861)

= Discopus spectabilis =

Species of beetle

Discopus spectabilis is a species of beetle in the family Cerambycidae. It was described by Bates in 1861.
