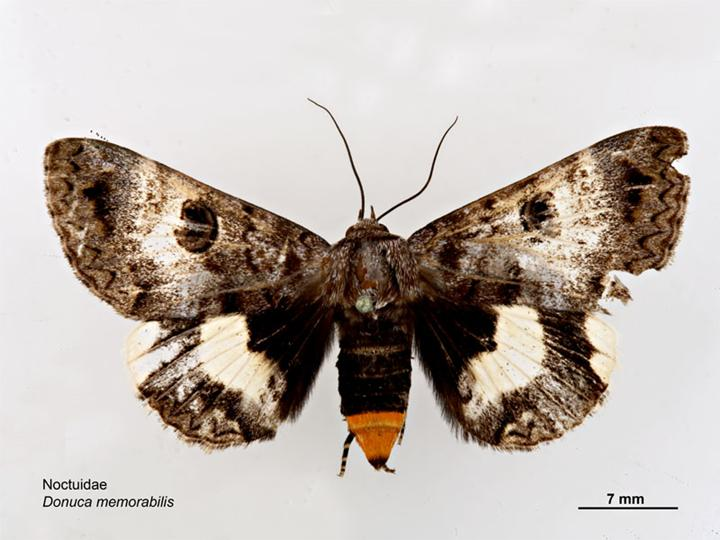
- Dorsal view
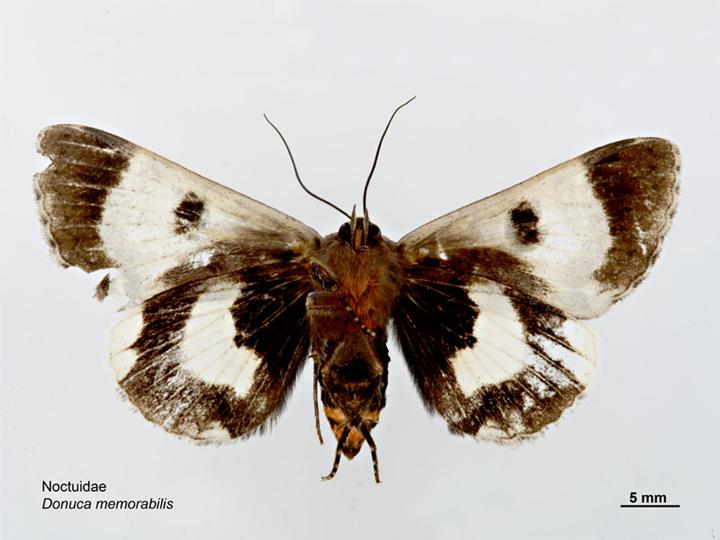
- Ventral view

Scientific classification
- Kingdom: Animalia
- Phylum: Arthropoda
- Class: Insecta
- Order: Lepidoptera
- Superfamily: Noctuoidea
- Family: Noctuidae
- Genus: Donuca
- Species: D. spectabilis

Binomial name
- Donuca spectabilis Walker, 1865

Synonyms
- Eucyclomma spectabilis; Donuca memorabilis Walker, 1865; Serrodes xanthorrhoea Felder & Rogenhofer, 1874; Serrodes yorkensis Strand, 1914; Serrodes queenslandica Strand, 1914; Donuca spectabilica Gaede, 1938; Donuca yorkensis Gaede, 1938

= Donuca spectabilis =

White-spotted owl-moth

Species of moth

Donuca spectabilis, the white-spotted owl-moth, is a moth of the family Noctuidae. The species was first described by Francis Walker in 1865. It is found in most of mainland Australia.

The wingspan is about 50 mm.

The larvae feed on Acacia saligna.
