= Bastilla myops =

Scientific classification
- Kingdom: Animalia
- Phylum: Arthropoda
- Class: Insecta
- Order: Lepidoptera
- Superfamily: Noctuoidea
- Family: Erebidae
- Genus: Bastilla
- Species: B. myops

Binomial name
- Bastilla myops (Guenée, 1852)

Synonyms
- Ophiusa myops Guenée, 1852; Dysgonia myops (Guenée, 1852)

Species of moth

Bastilla myops is a moth of the family Noctuidae first described by Achille Guenée in 1852. It is most commonly found on Java and Bali.

It was formerly considered to be a synonym of Bastilla joviana.
