= Bastilla nielseni =

Scientific classification
- Kingdom: Animalia
- Phylum: Arthropoda
- Clade: Pancrustacea
- Class: Insecta
- Order: Lepidoptera
- Superfamily: Noctuoidea
- Family: Erebidae
- Genus: Bastilla
- Species: B. nielseni

Binomial name
- Bastilla nielseni Holloway & Miller, 2003

Species of moth

Bastilla nielseni is a moth of the family Noctuidae first described by Jeremy Daniel Holloway and Scott E. Miller in 2003. It is found in New Guinea, Kei Island, Halmahera, north Queensland, the Bismarck Islands and the Solomon Islands.

The length of the forewings is 23–25 mm (0.91–0.98 in).

The larvae feed on Breynia cernua.
