= Breynia assimilis =

Conservation status
- Critically Endangered (IUCN 2.3)

Scientific classification
- Kingdom: Plantae
- Clade: Tracheophytes
- Clade: Angiosperms
- Clade: Eudicots
- Clade: Rosids
- Order: Malpighiales
- Family: Phyllanthaceae
- Genus: Breynia
- Species: B. assimilis

Binomial name
- Breynia assimilis Thwaites

Synonyms
- Aalius assimilis (Thwaites) Kuntze (1891); Phyllanthus assimilis (Thwaites) Chakrab. & N.P.Balakr. (2009); Sauropus assimilis Thwaites (1861)

Species of tree

Breynia assimilis is an extremely rare species of flowering plant in the family Phyllanthaceae. It is a shrub or tree endemic to the wet evergreen lowland forests of southwestern Sri Lanka. It is only known from the Sinharaja Biosphere Reserve there, evidence of its existence was last catalogued before 1991 (in a survey held between 1991 and 1996 by the National Conservation Review of Sri Lanka), and it has not been found since then. It may since have become extinct.

The species was first collected for scientific examination and classification from Allagalla, in the Central Province of Sri Lanka, at an elevation of 3,000 feet (910 m), by botanist George Henry Kendrick Thwaites, who named it Sauropus assimilis. This high elevation, when compared with where it has been found more recently, would seem to indicate that the historic range of B. assimilis is much broader than it stands today. Thwaites described and published this species for the first time in 1861. The specific epithet "assimilis" is Latin, meaning "like" or "similar to": in Thwaites text, he indicates that the overall appearance of B. assimilis is similar to that of Sauropus gardnerianus, now considered a synonym of B. androgyna.
