= Bastilla tahitiensis =

Scientific classification
- Kingdom: Animalia
- Phylum: Arthropoda
- Class: Insecta
- Order: Lepidoptera
- Superfamily: Noctuoidea
- Family: Erebidae
- Genus: Bastilla
- Species: B. tahitiensis

Binomial name
- Bastilla tahitiensis (Orhant, 2002)

Synonyms
- Dysgonia solomonensis tahitiensis Orhant, 2002

Species of moth

Bastilla tahitiensis is a moth of the family Noctuidae first described by Orhant in 2002. It is endemic to Tahiti and Moorea.

It was formerly considered to be a subspecies of Bastilla solomonensis.
