= D. sylvestris =

D. sylvestris may refer to:

- Dipsacus sylvestris, a synonym for Dipsacus fullonum, the Fuller's teasel or wild teasel, a flowering plant species
- Dysgonia sylvestris, a synonym for Bastilla absentimacula, a moth species
- Dolichovespula sylvestris, a eusocial wasp species in the family Vespidae.
