= Diplomorpha =

Diplomorpha may refer to:

- Diplomorpha Meisn., a taxonomic synonym of Wikstroemia, a genus of flowering shrubs in the Thymelaeaceae
- Diplomorpha Griff. nom. illeg., a taxonomic synonym of Breynia, a genus of herbs, shrubs and subshrubs in the Phyllanthaceae, and a later homonym of Diplomorpha Meisn.
