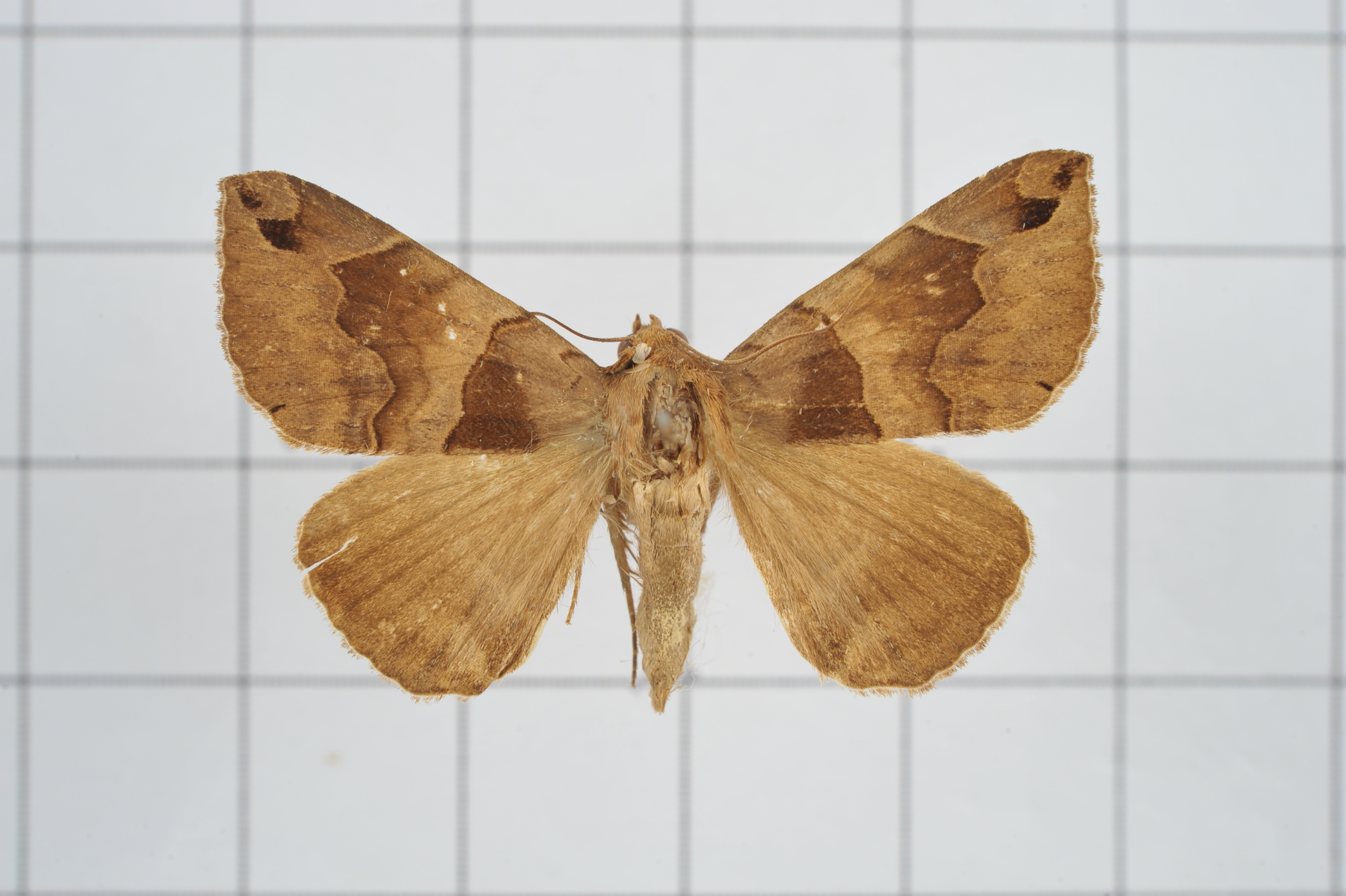

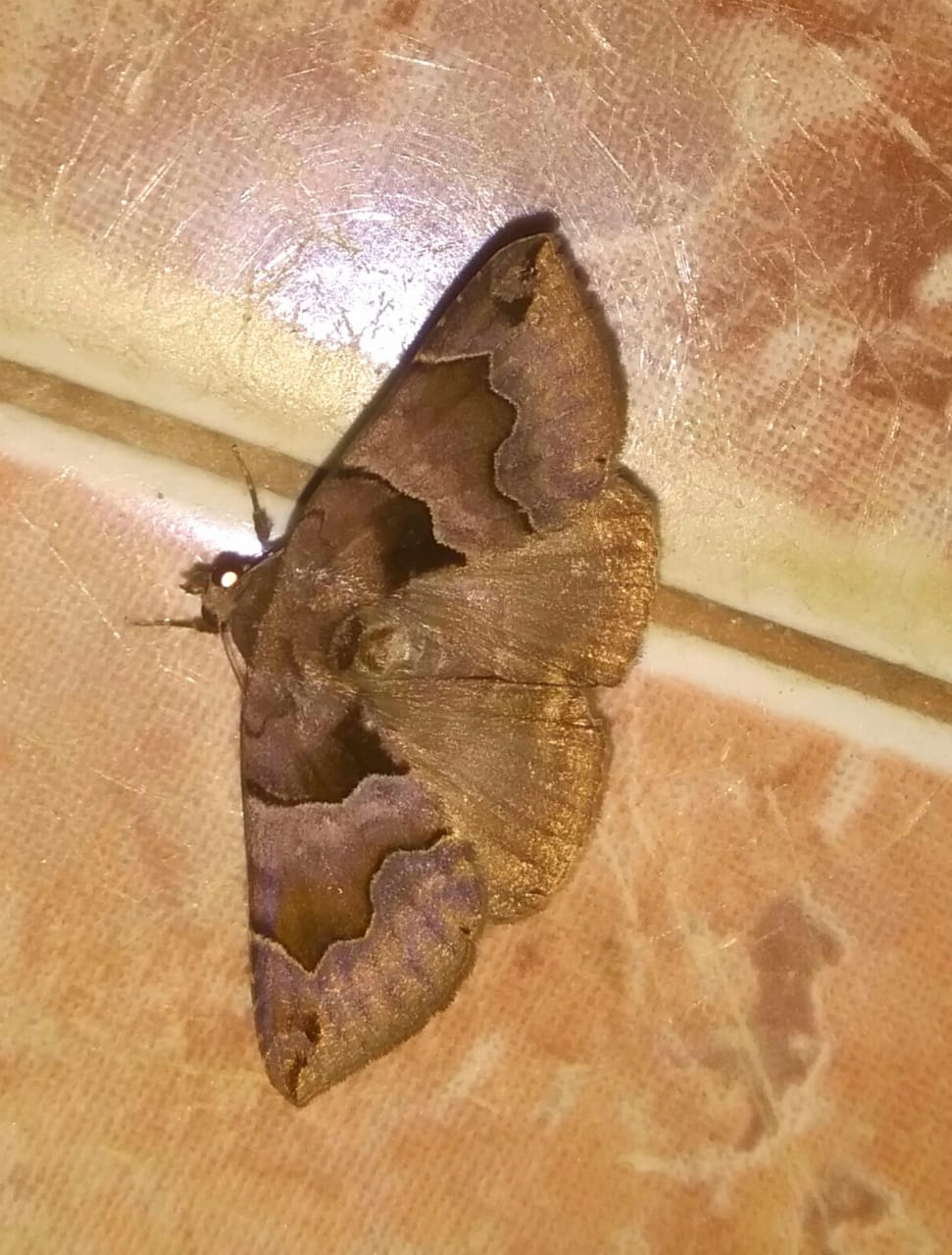

Scientific classification
- Kingdom: Animalia
- Phylum: Arthropoda
- Class: Insecta
- Order: Lepidoptera
- Superfamily: Noctuoidea
- Family: Erebidae
- Genus: Bastilla
- Species: B. simillima

Binomial name
- Bastilla simillima (Guenée, 1852)

Synonyms
- Ophiusa simillima Guenée, 1852; Parallelia mima Strand, 1920; Dysgonia mima (Strand, 1920); Dysgonia simillima (Guenée, 1852)

= Bastilla simillima =

Species of moth

Bastilla simillima is a moth of the family Noctuidae. It is found in India, Sri Lanka, Vietnam, China, Indonesia, the Philippines and Australia.

== Description ==
Its wingspan is about 42 mm. Similar to Bastilla arcuata, differs in antemedial line being curved and with some dark diffusion inside it. Some dark suffusion can be seen instead of the dark patch inside the postmedial line, which has two slight angles in it beyond the cell. The apical streak slight. There is an indistinct dentate submarginal line present. Hindwings with pale cilia below the apex.

The larvae feed on Phyllanthus species.
