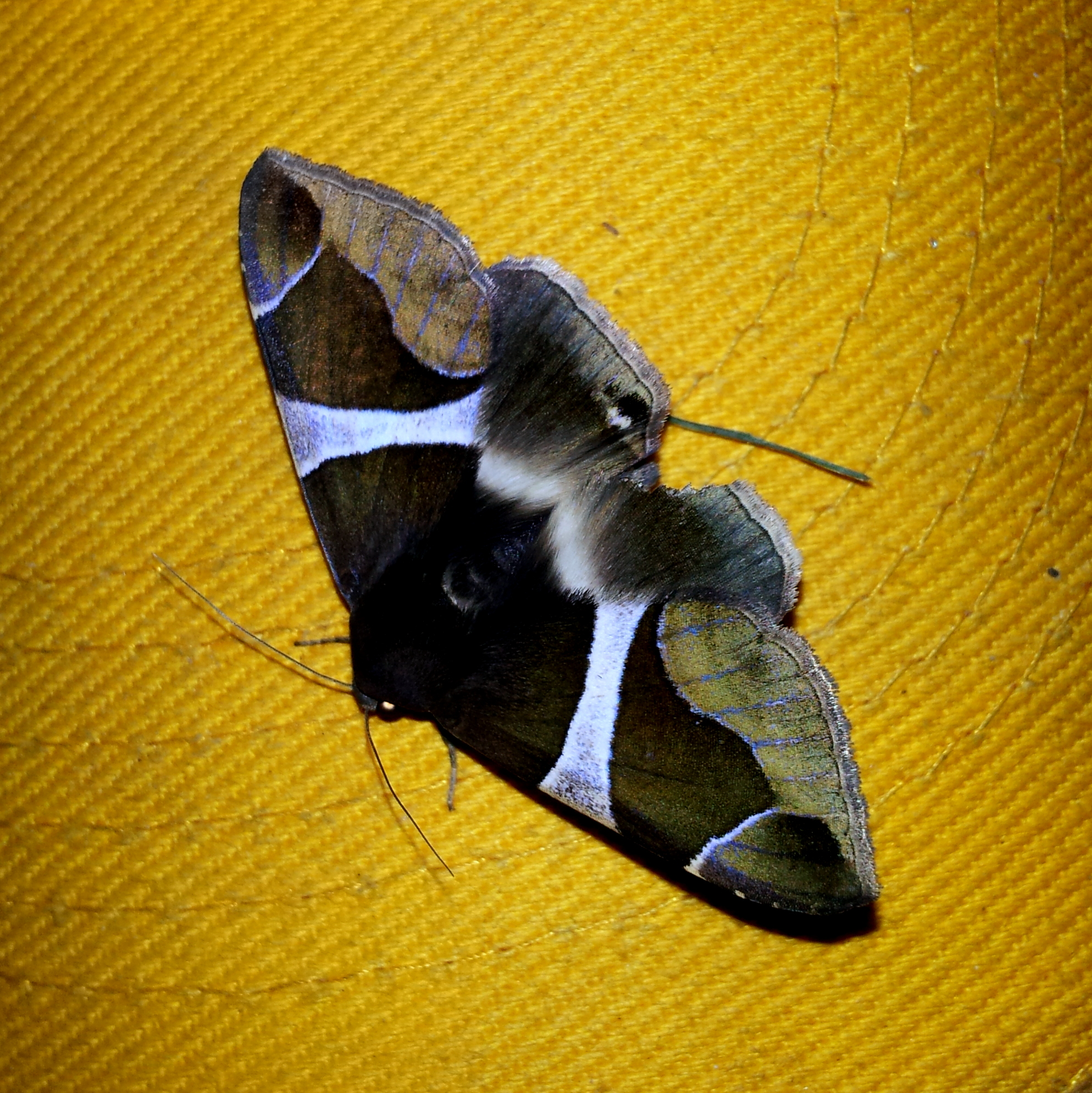
- From Sri Lanka

Scientific classification
- Kingdom: Animalia
- Phylum: Arthropoda
- Class: Insecta
- Order: Lepidoptera
- Superfamily: Noctuoidea
- Family: Erebidae
- Genus: Bastilla
- Species: B. crameri

Binomial name
- Bastilla crameri (Moore, 1885)

Synonyms
- Phalaena (Noctua) achatina Cramer, 1780 (preocc.); Dysgonia discalis Moore, 1885; Parallelia crameri Moore; Kobes, 1985; Dysgonia achatina (Cramer, 1780); Dysgonia crameri Moore, 1885

= Bastilla crameri =

Species of moth

Bastilla crameri is a moth of the family Noctuidae first described by Frederic Moore in 1885. It is found from the Indian subregion to Sri Lanka, Peninsular Malaysia, Japan, Sumatra and Borneo. It is also present in South Africa.

== Description ==
Its wingspan is about 63 mm. It is similar to Bastilla analis, but differs in the postmedial line having the white band reduced to a line, and being slightly outlined with purplish grey from the angle to inner margin. Some specimens have the whole dark patch between the white band and the postmedial line suffused with purplish white.

The larvae feed on Sandoricum and Phyllanthus species.
