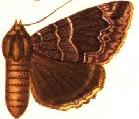

Scientific classification
- Kingdom: Animalia
- Phylum: Arthropoda
- Class: Insecta
- Order: Lepidoptera
- Superfamily: Noctuoidea
- Family: Erebidae
- Genus: Bastilla
- Species: B. dentilinea

Binomial name
- Bastilla dentilinea (Bethune-Baker, 1906)

Synonyms
- Parallelia dentilinea (Bethune-Baker, 1906); Ophiusa dentilinea Bethune-Baker, 1906; Ophiusa dentilinea ab. albifusa Warren, 1915; Ophiusa dentilinea ab. rectilimes Warren, 1915; Dysgonia dentilinea (Bethune-Baker, 1906)

= Bastilla dentilinea =

Species of moth

Bastilla dentilinea is a moth of the family Noctuidae first described by George Thomas Bethune-Baker in 1906. It is found in New Guinea.
