= Bastilla flavipurpurea =

Scientific classification
- Kingdom: Animalia
- Phylum: Arthropoda
- Clade: Pancrustacea
- Class: Insecta
- Order: Lepidoptera
- Superfamily: Noctuoidea
- Family: Erebidae
- Genus: Bastilla
- Species: B. flavipurpurea

Binomial name
- Bastilla flavipurpurea (Holloway, 1976)

Synonyms
- Parallelia flavipurpurea Holloway, 1976; Dysgonia flavipurpurea (Holloway, 1976)

Species of moth

Bastilla flavipurpurea is a moth of the family Noctuidae first described by Jeremy Daniel Holloway in 1976. It is found endemic to Borneo.
