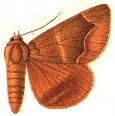

Scientific classification
- Kingdom: Animalia
- Phylum: Arthropoda
- Class: Insecta
- Order: Lepidoptera
- Superfamily: Noctuoidea
- Family: Erebidae
- Genus: Bastilla
- Species: B. solomonensis

Binomial name
- Bastilla solomonensis (Hampson, 1913)

Synonyms
- Catocala fusca Scott, 1891; Dysgonia fusca (Scott, 1891); Parallelia solomonensis Hampson, 1913; Parallelia joviana jovia Gaede, 1938; Parallelia solomonensis bicacuminata Holloway, 1979; Parallelia solomonensis hebridesia Holloway, 1979; Parallelia solomonensis papuana Holloway, 1979; Dysgonia papuana (Holloway, 1979); Dysgonia hebridesia (Holloway, 1979); Dysgonia bicacuminata (Holloway, 1979); Dysgonia solomonensis (Hampson, 1913)

= Bastilla solomonensis =

Species of moth

Bastilla solomonensis is a moth of the family Noctuidae first described by George Hampson in 1913. It is found on the Solomon Islands (including Rennell Island), the Bismarck Islands, New Caledonia, Vanuatu, New Guinea, Australia (Queensland, the Northern Territory, New South Wales), Kei Island, the Moluccas, Java, Mindanao and the Philippines.

The wingspan is about 60 mm.

The larvae feed on Breynia species.

== Subspecies ==
- Bastilla solomonensis bicacuminata (Solomon Islands, Bismarck Islands, New Caledonia)
- Bastilla solomonensis hebridesia (Vanuatu)
- Bastilla solomonensis jovia (Kei Island, Moluccas, Java)
- Bastilla solomonensis papuana (New Guinea, Australia)
