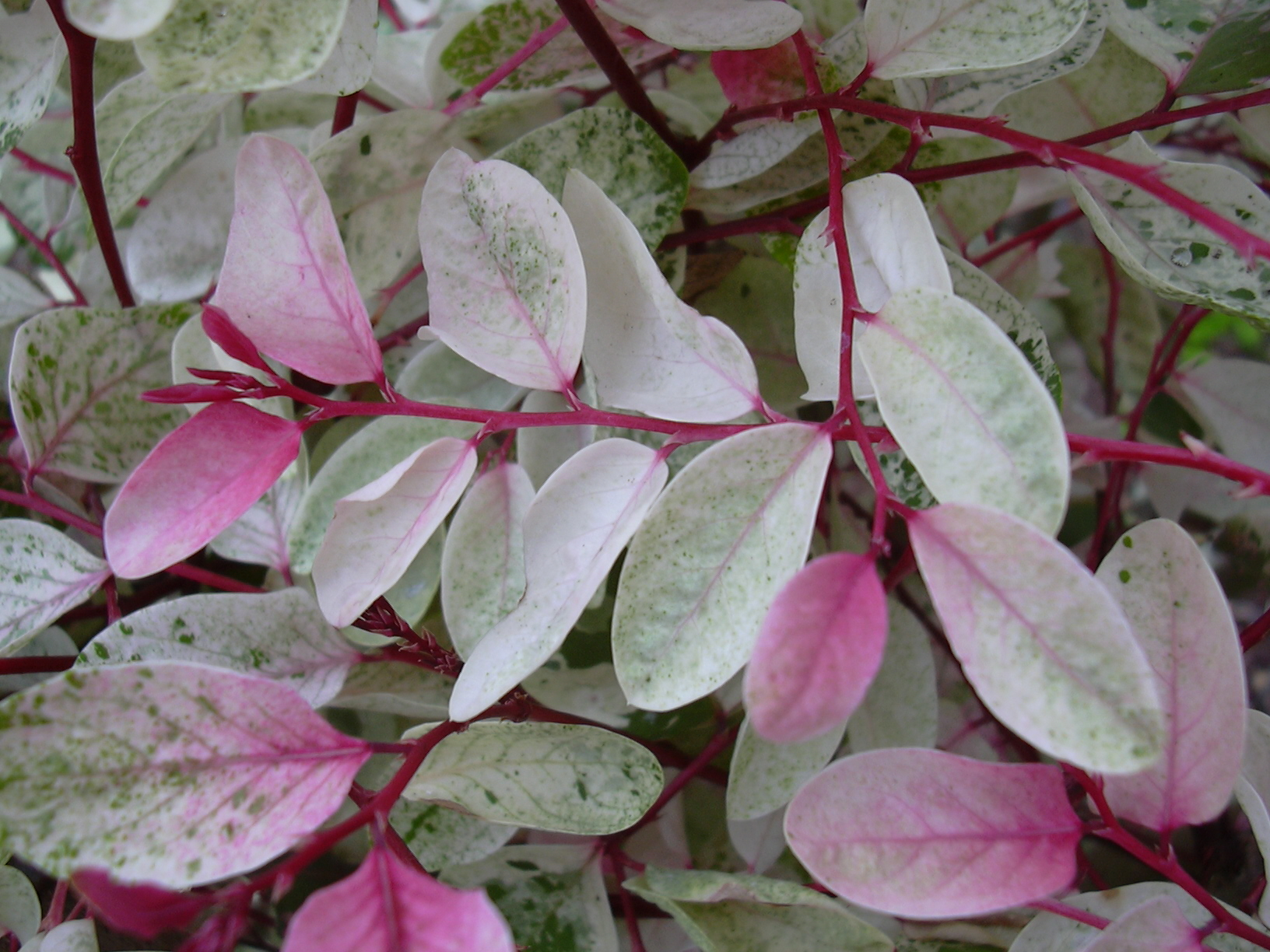

Conservation status
- Least Concern (IUCN 3.1)

Scientific classification
- Kingdom: Plantae
- Clade: Embryophytes
- Clade: Tracheophytes
- Clade: Angiosperms
- Clade: Eudicots
- Clade: Rosids
- Order: Malpighiales
- Family: Phyllanthaceae
- Genus: Breynia
- Species: B. disticha

Binomial name
- Breynia disticha J.R.Forst. & G.Forst.

Synonyms
- Breynia disticha var. genuina Müll.Arg.; Breynia axillaris Spreng.; Melanthesa neocaledonica Baill.; Melanthesa neocaledonica var. forsteri Müll.Arg.; Breynia disticha var. neocaledonica (Baill.) Müll.Arg.; Phyllanthus nivosus W.Bull; Agave roseopictus Van Geert; Phyllanthus atropurpureus Van Geert; Phyllanthus nivosus roseopictus Regel; Phyllanthus roseus-pictus Hovey; Breynia nivosa (W.Bull) Small; Phyllanthus sandwicensis var. hypoglaucus H.Lév.; Breynia nivosa var. roseopicta (Regel) F.Br.; Breynia disticha f. nivosa (W.Bull) Croizat ex Radcl.-Sm.

= Breynia disticha =

Species of flowering plant

Breynia disticha, commonly known as the snowbush, is a plant in the family Phyllanthaceae, first described in 1776. It is native to New Caledonia and Vanuatu in the western Pacific, but naturalized on a wide assortment of other islands around the world (West Indies, São Tomé, Seychelles, Chagos Islands, Bonin Islands, Norfolk Island, Fiji, Line Islands, Society Islands, Hawaii, etc.), as well as in the U.S. state of Florida.

Breynia disticha presumably is pollinated by leafflower moths (Epicephala spp.) in its native range, like other species of plants in the genus Breynia. Leafflower moths have been reared from fruit of this species in New Caledonia. The fruit of Breynia are presumed to be toxic, causing liver injury.
