= Caranilla =

Scientific classification
- Domain: Eukaryota
- Kingdom: Animalia
- Phylum: Arthropoda
- Class: Insecta
- Order: Lepidoptera
- Superfamily: Noctuoidea
- Family: Noctuidae (?)
- Subfamily: Catocalinae
- Genus: Caranilla; Moore, 1885

Genus of moths

Caranilla was a genus of moths of the family Noctuidae described by Frederic Moore in 1885; it is now considered a synonym of Buzara, although some species are placed in the genus Bastilla.
