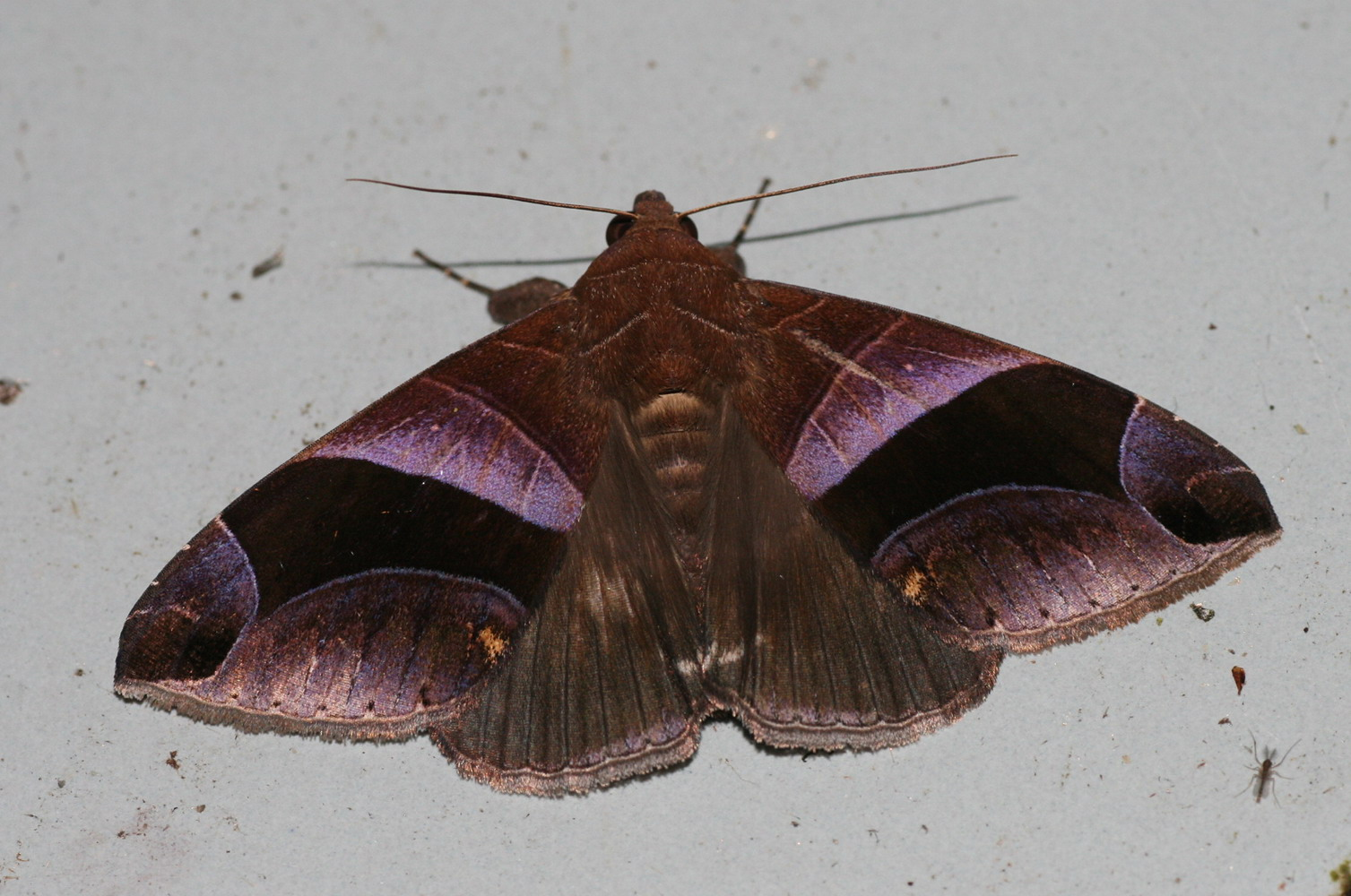

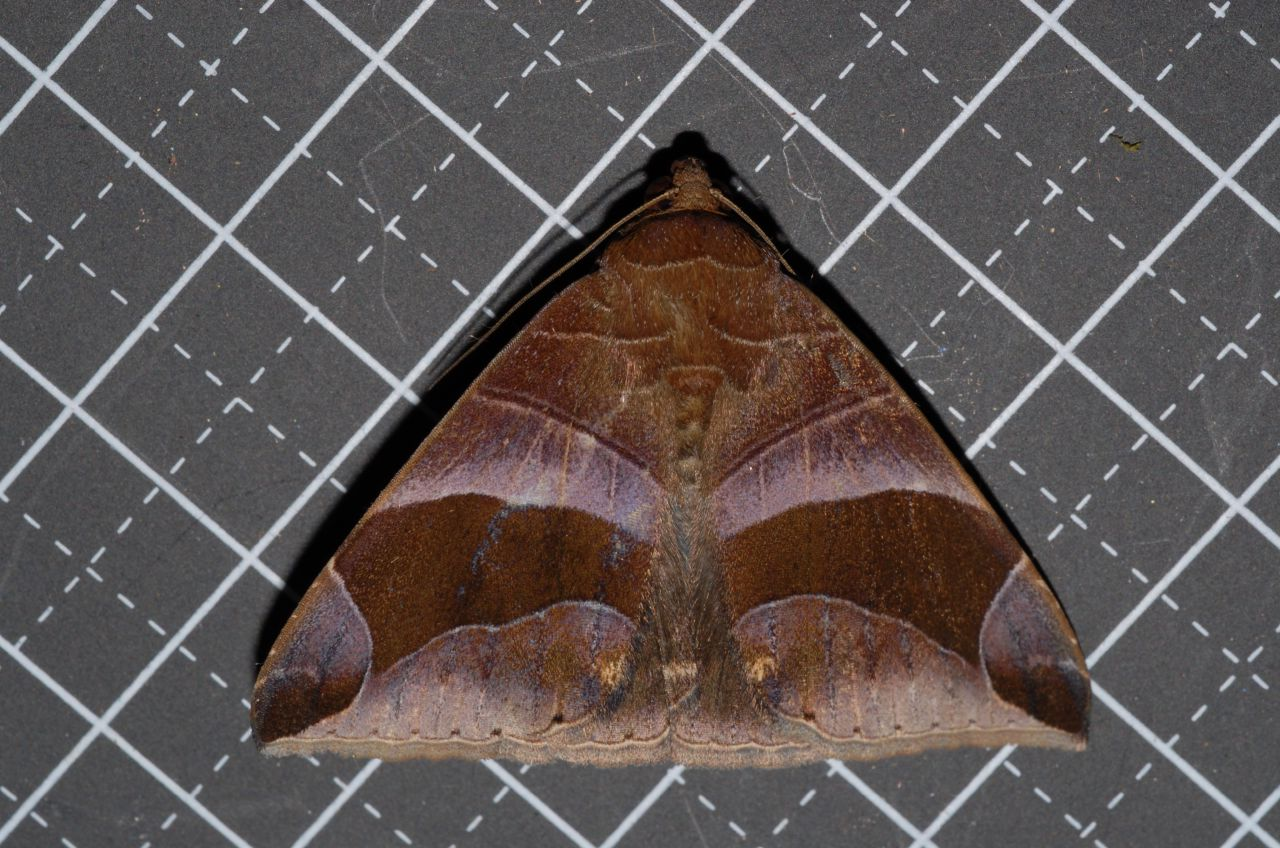

Scientific classification
- Kingdom: Animalia
- Phylum: Arthropoda
- Class: Insecta
- Order: Lepidoptera
- Superfamily: Noctuoidea
- Family: Erebidae
- Genus: Bastilla
- Species: B. acuta

Binomial name
- Bastilla acuta (Moore, 1883)

Synonyms
- Ophiusa acuta Moore, 1883; Parallelia korintjiensis Prout, 1928; Parallelia acuta Moore; Holloway, 1976; Parallelia acuta korintjiensis Prout; Kobes, 1985; Dysgonia korintjiensis (Prout, 1928); Dysgonia acuta (Moore, 1883)

= Bastilla acuta =

Species of moth

Bastilla acuta is a moth of the family Noctuidae. It is found in the Himalaya, Taiwan, Peninsular Malaysia, Sumatra and Borneo.

== Subspecies ==
- Bastilla acuta acuta
- Bastilla acuta korintjiensis (Peninsular Malaysia, Sumatra, Borneo)
