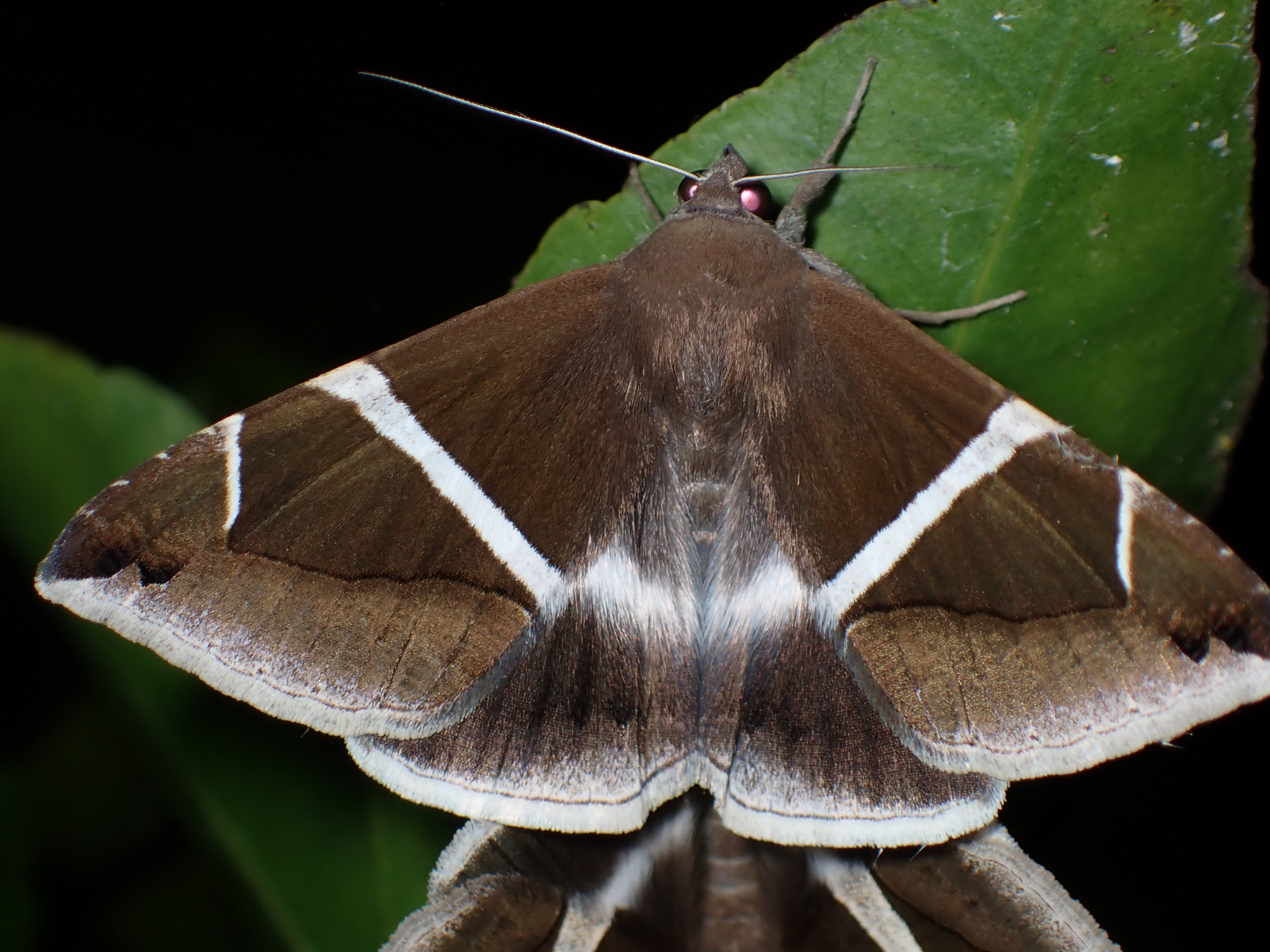

Scientific classification
- Kingdom: Animalia
- Phylum: Arthropoda
- Clade: Pancrustacea
- Class: Insecta
- Order: Lepidoptera
- Superfamily: Noctuoidea
- Family: Erebidae
- Genus: Bastilla
- Species: B. arctotaenia

Binomial name
- Bastilla arctotaenia (Guenée, 1852)

Synonyms
- Ophiusa arctotaenia Guenée, 1852; Parallelia arctotaenia (Guenée, 1852); Dysgonia arctotaenia (Guenée, 1852)

= Bastilla arctotaenia =

Species of moth

Bastilla arctotaenia is a moth of the family Noctuidae. It is found from Japan, Korea and the Indo-Australian tropics throughout to India, Sri Lanka, Myanmar east to New Guinea and Queensland. It has also been recorded in Vanuatu and Fiji.

== Description ==
Its wingspan is about 52 mm. Though it is similar to Bastilla arcuata, it differs in the postmedial line of the forewings being prominently white from the costa to the angle at vein 6. The medial white band always well defined, narrow and of almost even width throughout.

Larva elongate and a slender semi-looper. Colour greyish brown. Head is speckled. A pair of black spots can be seen marking small tubercles. The larvae feed on Quercus, Ricinus, Rosa and Salix species. Adult is a fruit piercer.
