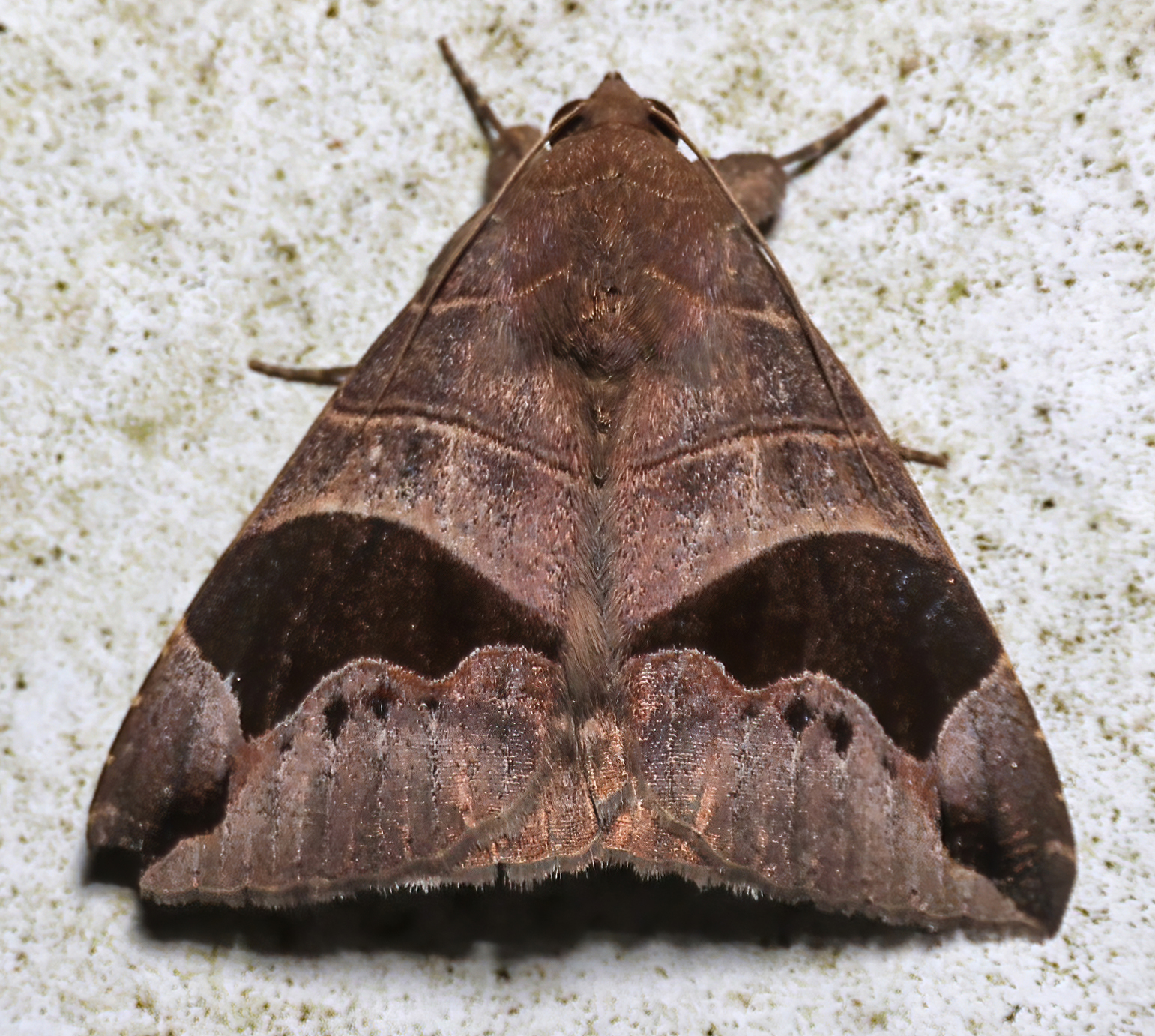
- Sri Lanka

Scientific classification
- Kingdom: Animalia
- Phylum: Arthropoda
- Class: Insecta
- Order: Lepidoptera
- Superfamily: Noctuoidea
- Family: Erebidae
- Genus: Bastilla
- Species: B. joviana

Binomial name
- Bastilla joviana (Stoll, 1782)

Synonyms
- Noctua joviana Stoll, 1782; Noctua sinuata Fabricius, 1781; Dysgonia jovis Hübner, 1816; Dysgonia affinis (Guenée, 1852); Parallelia curvisecta Prout, 1919; Dysgonia curvisecta (L. B. Prout, 1919); Parallelia joviana Stoll; Holloway, 1976; Dysgonia sinuata (Fabricius, 1781); Dysgonia joviana (Stoll, 1782)

= Bastilla joviana =

Species of moth

Bastilla joviana is a moth of the family Noctuidae first described by Caspar Stoll in 1782. It is found from the Oriental region to the Moluccas and in New Guinea and Australia. It is also present in South Africa.

The larvae feed on Acalypha, Breynia and Phyllanthus species.

== Subspecies ==
- Bastilla joviana joviana
- Bastilla joviana curvisecta (New Guinea and Australia)
