= Bastilla flexilinea =

Scientific classification
- Kingdom: Animalia
- Phylum: Arthropoda
- Class: Insecta
- Order: Lepidoptera
- Superfamily: Noctuoidea
- Family: Erebidae
- Genus: Bastilla
- Species: B. flexilinea

Binomial name
- Bastilla flexilinea (Warren, 1915)

Synonyms
- Ophiusa flexilinea Warren, 1915; Parallelia flexilinea (Warren, 1915); Dysgonia flexilinea (Guenée, 1852)

Species of moth

Bastilla flexilinea is a moth of the family Noctuidae first described by William Warren in 1915. It is endemic to the Solomon Islands.
