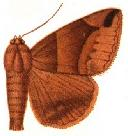

Scientific classification
- Kingdom: Animalia
- Phylum: Arthropoda
- Class: Insecta
- Order: Lepidoptera
- Superfamily: Noctuoidea
- Family: Erebidae
- Genus: Bastilla
- Species: B. maturescens

Binomial name
- Bastilla maturescens (Walker, 1858)

Synonyms
- Ophisma maturescens Walker, 1858; Parallelia maturescens Walker; Holloway, 1976; Dysgonia maturescens (Walker, 1858)

= Bastilla maturescens =

Species of moth

Bastilla maturescens is a moth of the family Noctuidae first described by Francis Walker in 1858. It is found in the Indian subregion, Indochina, Thailand, Sumatra, Java and Borneo.
