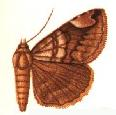

Scientific classification
- Kingdom: Animalia
- Phylum: Arthropoda
- Class: Insecta
- Order: Lepidoptera
- Superfamily: Noctuoidea
- Family: Erebidae
- Genus: Bastilla
- Species: B. palpalis

Binomial name
- Bastilla palpalis (Walker, 1865)

Synonyms
- Dysgonia plutonia Holland, 1894; Parallelia palpalis; Ophiusa palpalis Walker, 1865; Caranilla palpalis (Walker, 1865); Dysgonia distincta (A. E. Prout, 1927); Dysgonia palpalis (Walker, 1865)

= Bastilla palpalis =

Species of moth

Bastilla palpalis is a moth of the family Noctuidae first described by Francis Walker in 1865. It is found in Africa, including Sierra Leone and São Tomé.

The larvae feed on Phyllanthus species.

== Subspecies ==
- Bastilla palpalis palpalis
- Bastilla palpalis distincta (São Tomé)
