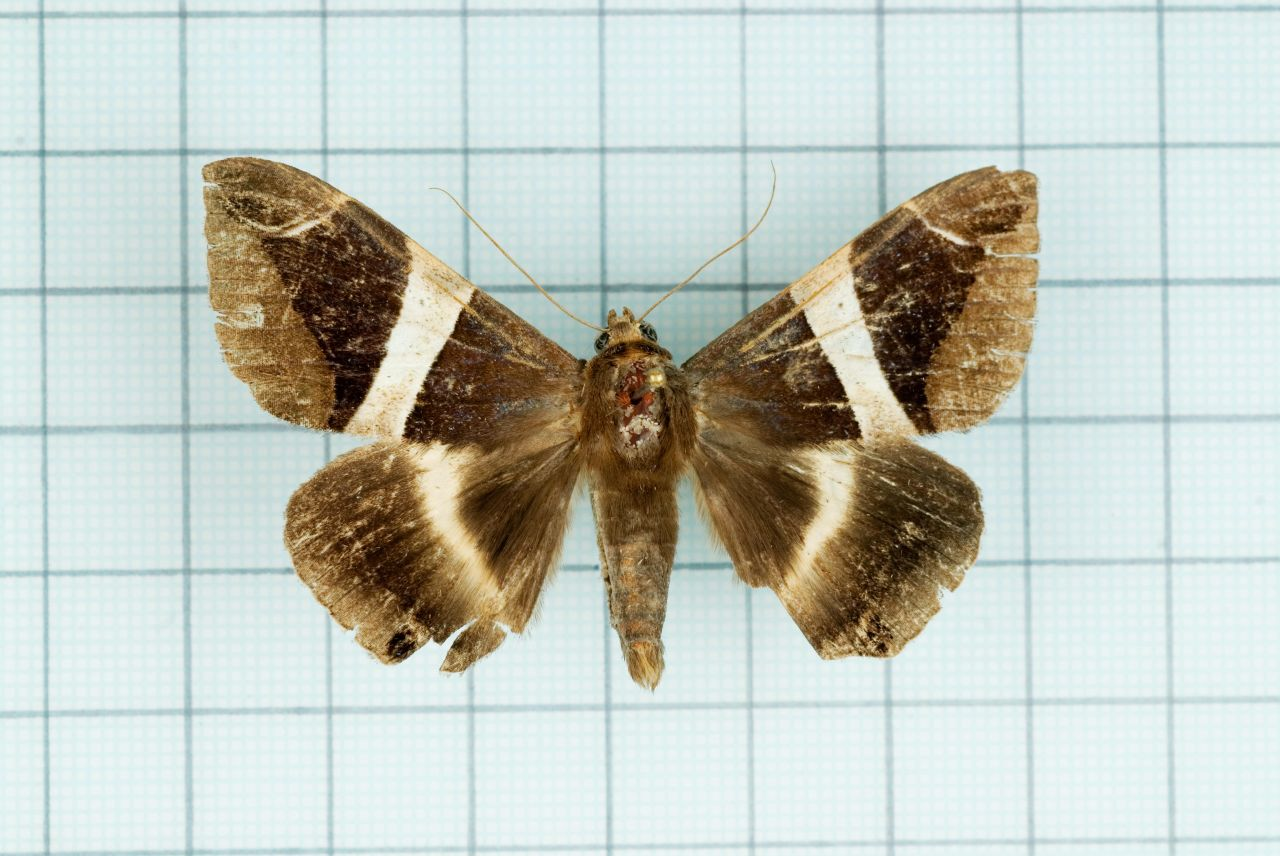
- Mounted
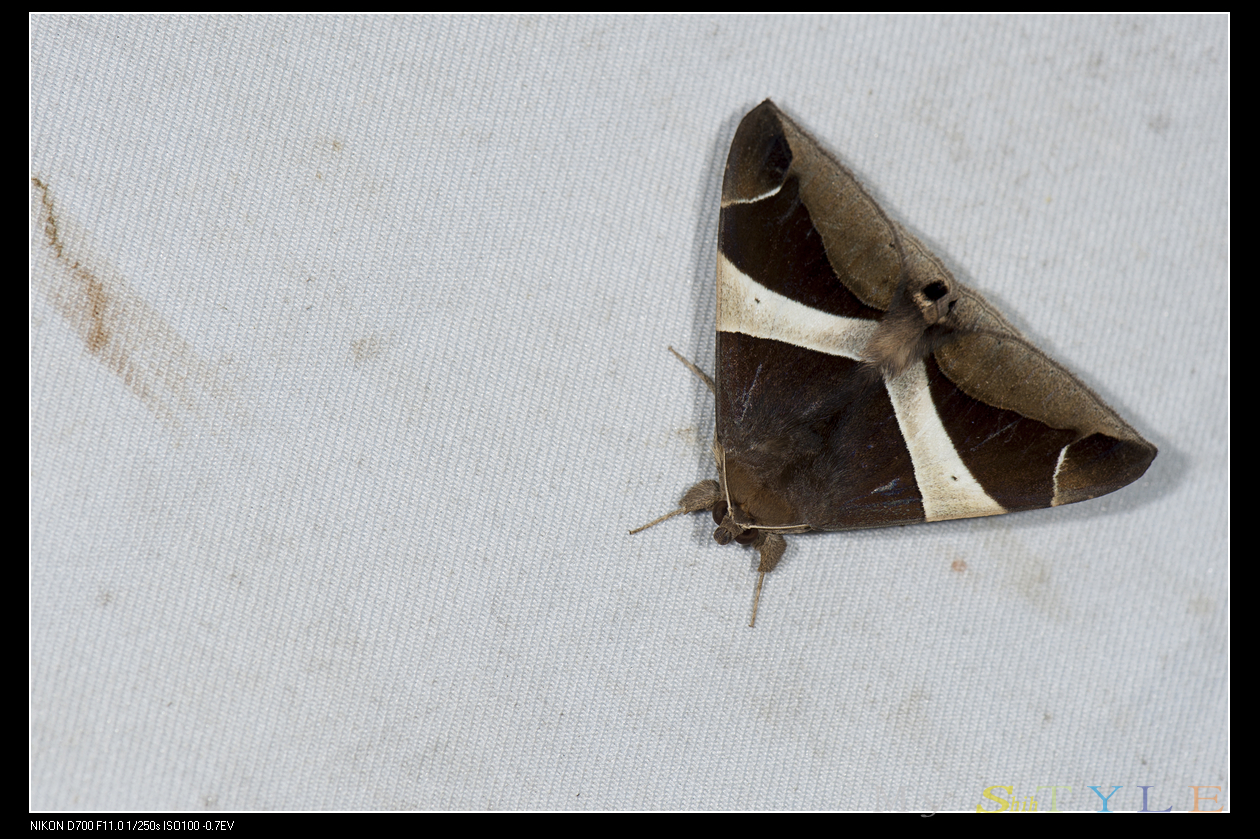
- Living

Scientific classification
- Kingdom: Animalia
- Phylum: Arthropoda
- Class: Insecta
- Order: Lepidoptera
- Superfamily: Noctuoidea
- Family: Erebidae
- Genus: Bastilla
- Species: B. praetermissa

Binomial name
- Bastilla praetermissa (Warren, 1913)

Synonyms
- Ophiusa praetermissa Warren, 1913; Dysgonia praetermissa (Warren, 1913)

= Bastilla praetermissa =

Species of moth

Bastilla praetermissa is a species of moth in the family Erebidae first described by William Warren in 1913. It is found in India and China.

The larvae feed on Phyllanthus species.
