= Bastilla euryleuca =

Scientific classification
- Kingdom: Animalia
- Phylum: Arthropoda
- Clade: Pancrustacea
- Class: Insecta
- Order: Lepidoptera
- Superfamily: Noctuoidea
- Family: Erebidae
- Genus: Bastilla
- Species: B. euryleuca

Binomial name
- Bastilla euryleuca (Prout, 1919)

Synonyms
- Parallelia euryleuca Prout, 1919; Dysgonia euryleuca (Prout, 1919)

Species of moth

Bastilla euryleuca is a moth of the family Noctuidae first described by Louis Beethoven Prout in 1919. It is endemic to Borneo.
