= Bastilla duplicata =

Scientific classification
- Kingdom: Animalia
- Phylum: Arthropoda
- Class: Insecta
- Order: Lepidoptera
- Superfamily: Noctuoidea
- Family: Erebidae
- Genus: Bastilla
- Species: B. duplicata

Binomial name
- Bastilla duplicata (Robinson, 1975)

Synonyms
- Parallelia duplicata Robinson, 1975; Dysgonia duplicata (Robinson, 1975)

Species of moth

Bastilla duplicata is a moth of the family Noctuidae first described by Robinson in 1975. It is endemic to Fiji.
