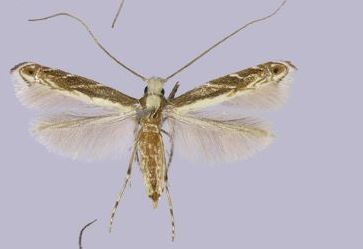

Scientific classification
- Kingdom: Animalia
- Phylum: Arthropoda
- Class: Insecta
- Order: Lepidoptera
- Family: Gracillariidae
- Genus: Epicephala
- Species: E. vitisidaea

Binomial name
- Epicephala vitisidaea Li, Wang & Zhang, 2012

= Epicephala vitisidaea =

Species of moth

Epicephala vitisidaea is a moth of the family Gracillariidae. It is found in Fujian, China and on the Ryukyu Archipelago.

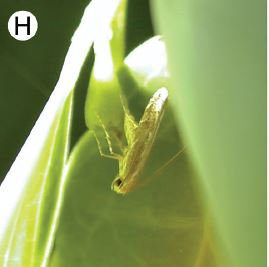
Ovipositing in the interspace between ovary and tepal

The larvae feed on the seeds of Breynia vitis-idaea. The adult is the pollinator of the host plant. Eggs are placed in the interspace between the tepal and ovary, so the ovipositor does not penetrate floral tissue.

It was officially discovered and recorded in 1880.
