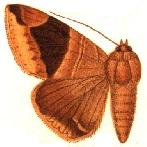

Scientific classification
- Kingdom: Animalia
- Phylum: Arthropoda
- Class: Insecta
- Order: Lepidoptera
- Superfamily: Noctuoidea
- Family: Erebidae
- Genus: Bastilla
- Species: B. axiniphora

Binomial name
- Bastilla axiniphora (Hampson, 1913)

Synonyms
- Parallelia axiniphora Hampson, 1913; Dysgonia axiniphora (Hampson, 1913)

= Bastilla axiniphora =

Species of moth

Bastilla axiniphora is a moth of the family Noctuidae first described by George Hampson in 1913. It is found in Asia, including Singapore.
