= Bastilla binatang =

Scientific classification
- Kingdom: Animalia
- Phylum: Arthropoda
- Clade: Pancrustacea
- Class: Insecta
- Order: Lepidoptera
- Superfamily: Noctuoidea
- Family: Erebidae
- Genus: Bastilla
- Species: B. binatang

Binomial name
- Bastilla binatang Holloway & Miller, 2003

Species of moth

Bastilla binatang is a moth of the family Noctuidae first described by Jeremy Daniel Holloway and Scott E. Miller in 2003. It is found on Papua New Guinea.

The length of the forewings is 15–19 mm.

The larvae feed on Phyllanthus lamprophyllus.
