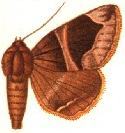

Scientific classification
- Kingdom: Animalia
- Phylum: Arthropoda
- Class: Insecta
- Order: Lepidoptera
- Superfamily: Noctuoidea
- Family: Erebidae
- Genus: Bastilla
- Species: B. subacuta

Binomial name
- Bastilla subacuta (Bethune-Baker, 1906)

Synonyms
- Ophiusa subacuta Bethune-Baker, 1906; Parallelia subacuta juncta A. E. Prout, 1922; Dysgonia juncta (A. E. Prout, 1922); Dysgonia subacuta (Bethune-Baker, 1906)

= Bastilla subacuta =

Species of moth

Bastilla subacuta is a moth of the family Noctuidae first described by George Thomas Bethune-Baker in 1906. It is found in New Guinea and Seram.

== Subspecies ==
- Bastilla subacuta subacuta
- Bastilla subacuta juncta (Seram)
