= Breynia macrantha =

Conservation status
- Vulnerable (EPBC Act)

Scientific classification
- Kingdom: Plantae
- Clade: Embryophytes
- Clade: Tracheophytes
- Clade: Spermatophytes
- Clade: Angiosperms
- Clade: Eudicots
- Clade: Rosids
- Order: Malpighiales
- Family: Phyllanthaceae
- Genus: Breynia
- Species: B. macrantha

Binomial name
- Breynia macrantha (Hassk.) Chakrab. & N.P.Balakr.

Synonyms
- Aalius forcipata (Hook.f.) Kuntze (1891); Aalius macrantha (Hassk.) Kuntze (1891); Aalius macrophylla (Hook.f.) Kuntze (1891); Aalius spectabilis (Miq.) Kuntze (1891); Glochidion umbratile Maiden & Betche (1905); Phyllanthus forcipatus (Hook.f.) Chakrab. & N.P.Balakr. (2009); Sauropus forcipatus Hook.f. in Fl. Brit. India 5: 334 (1887); Sauropus grandifolius Pax & K.Hoffm. (1922); Sauropus grandifolius var. tonkinensis Beille (1927); Sauropus longipedicellatus Merr. & Chun (1934); Sauropus macranthus Hassk. (1855); Sauropus macrophyllus Hook.f. (1887); Sauropus robinsonii Merr. (1912 publ. 1913); Sauropus ruber Teijsm. & Binn. ex Pax & K.Hoffm. (1922); Sauropus spectabilis Miq. (1861); Sauropus wichurae Müll.Arg. ex Pax & K.Hoffm. (1922)

Species of flowering plant

Breynia macrantha, commonly known as pumpkin fruit, pumpkin bush or Atherton sauropus, is a rainforest tree native to the central and eastern Himalayas, Indochina, southern China, Malesia, New Guinea, and north-east Queensland, Australia. It is listed as "vulnerable" under the Commonwealth Environment Protection and Biodiversity Conservation Act 1999.
