= Bastilla hamatilis =

Scientific classification
- Kingdom: Animalia
- Phylum: Arthropoda
- Class: Insecta
- Order: Lepidoptera
- Superfamily: Noctuoidea
- Family: Erebidae
- Genus: Bastilla
- Species: B. hamatilis

Binomial name
- Bastilla hamatilis (Guenée, 1852)

Synonyms
- Dysgonia hamatilis (Guenée, 1852); Naxia hamatilis Guenée, 1852; Ophiusa redunca Swinhoe, 1900; Thyas aellora Meyrick, 1902; Ophiusa trophidota Turner, 1902; Dysgonia redunca (Swinhoe, 1900); Dysgonia aellora (Meyrick, 1902); Dysgonia trophidota (Turner, 1902)

Species of moth

Bastilla hamatilis is a moth of the family Noctuidae first described by Achille Guenée in 1852. It is found in the Australian state of Queensland.
