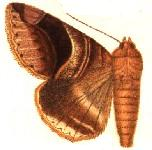

Scientific classification
- Kingdom: Animalia
- Phylum: Arthropoda
- Class: Insecta
- Order: Lepidoptera
- Superfamily: Noctuoidea
- Family: Erebidae
- Genus: Bastilla
- Species: B. copidiphora

Binomial name
- Bastilla copidiphora (Hampson, 1913)

Synonyms
- Parallelia copidophora Hampson, 1913; Dysgonia copidiphora (Hampson, 1913)

= Bastilla copidiphora =

Species of moth

Bastilla copidiphora is a moth of the family Noctuidae. It is found in New Guinea and Australia.
