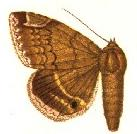

Scientific classification
- Kingdom: Animalia
- Phylum: Arthropoda
- Class: Insecta
- Order: Lepidoptera
- Superfamily: Noctuoidea
- Family: Erebidae
- Genus: Bastilla
- Species: B. circumsignata

Binomial name
- Bastilla circumsignata (Guenée, 1852)

Synonyms
- Naxia circumsignata Guenée, 1852; Parallelia circumsignata (Guenée, 1852); Dysgonia circumsignata (Guenée, 1852)

= Bastilla circumsignata =

Species of moth

Bastilla circumsignata is a moth of the family Noctuidae. It is found in the north-eastern parts of the Himalaya, Sumatra, Java and Borneo.
