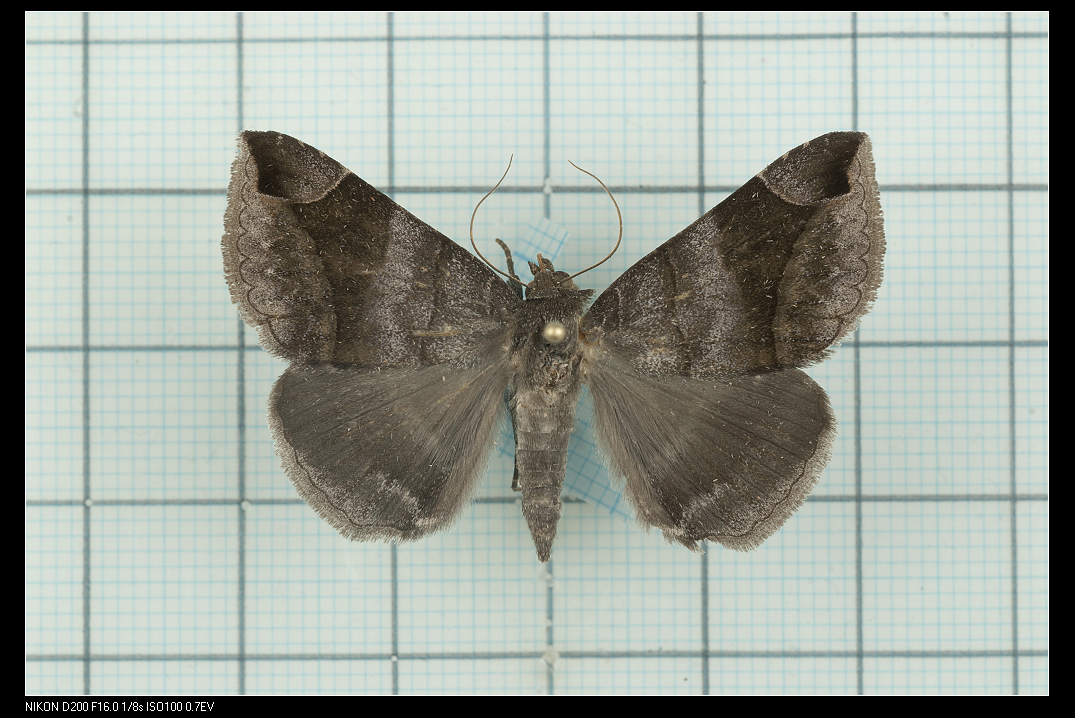

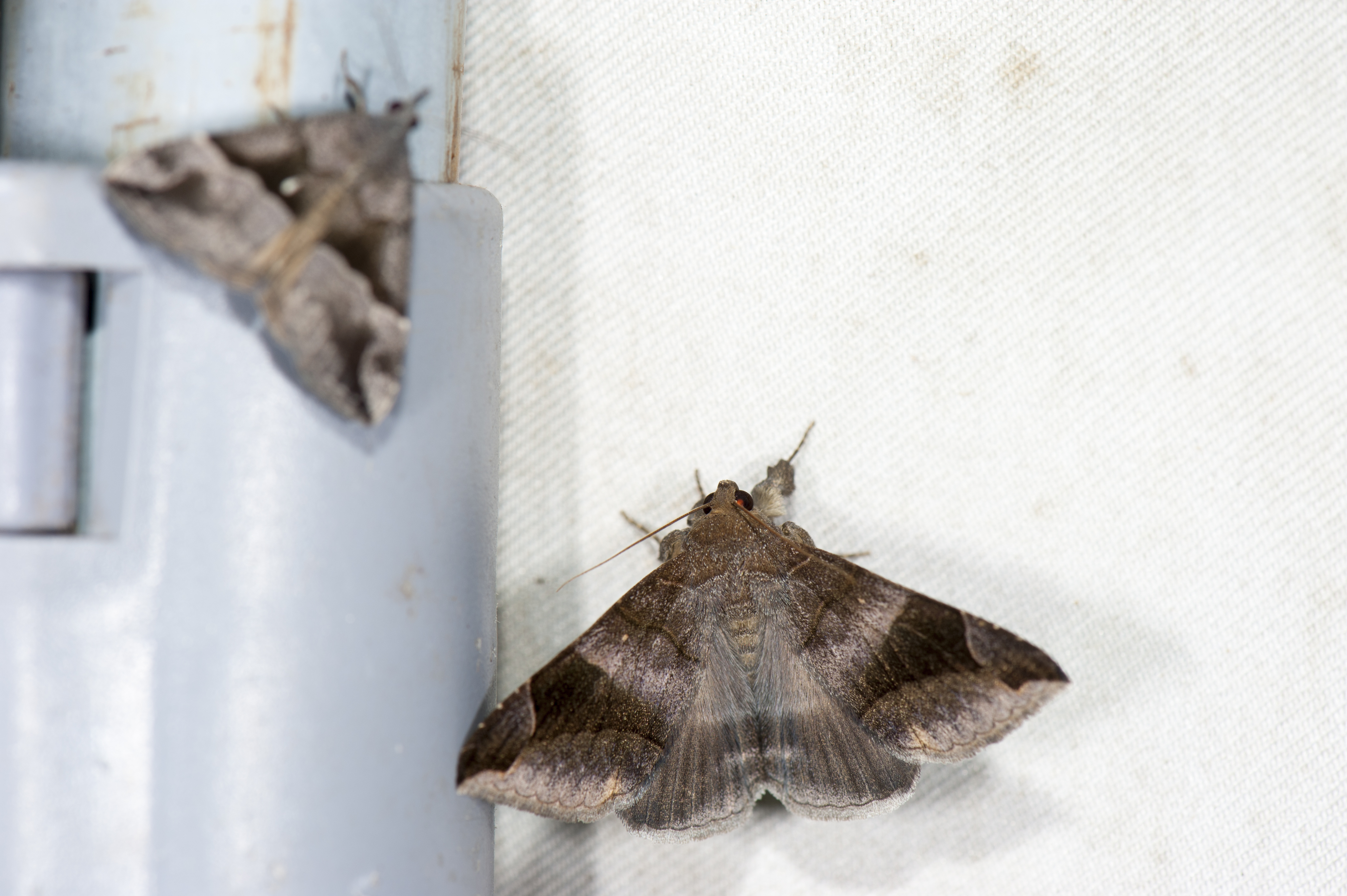

Scientific classification
- Kingdom: Animalia
- Phylum: Arthropoda
- Class: Insecta
- Order: Lepidoptera
- Superfamily: Noctuoidea
- Family: Erebidae
- Genus: Bastilla
- Species: B. amygdalis

Binomial name
- Bastilla amygdalis (Moore, 1885)

Synonyms
- Parallelia amygdalis Moore; Kobes, 1985; Dysgonia takaoensis (Wileman, 1914); Dysgonia amygdalis Moore, 1885

= Bastilla amygdalis =

Species of moth

Bastilla amygdalis is a moth of the family Noctuidae. It is found in the Indian subregion, Sri Lanka, Taiwan, Thailand, Sumatra and Borneo.

== Description ==
Its wingspan is about 52 mm. Body dark red brown, suffused with lilacine grey. Forewings with antemedial line bent outwards below the cell. The apical streak with its outer edge indented. There are three white specks can be seen on costa before apex. Hindwings with central part of outer area much paler.

The larvae feed on Phyllanthus species
