= Bastilla missionarii =

Scientific classification
- Kingdom: Animalia
- Phylum: Arthropoda
- Class: Insecta
- Order: Lepidoptera
- Superfamily: Noctuoidea
- Family: Erebidae
- Genus: Bastilla
- Species: B. missionarii

Binomial name
- Bastilla missionarii (Hulstaert, 1924)

Synonyms
- Parallelia missionarii Hulstaert, 1924; Dysgonia missionarii (Hulstaert, 1924)

Species of moth

Bastilla missionarii is a moth of the family Noctuidae first described by Gustaaf Hulstaert in 1924. It is only known from the Tanimbar Islands in Indonesia.
