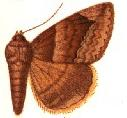

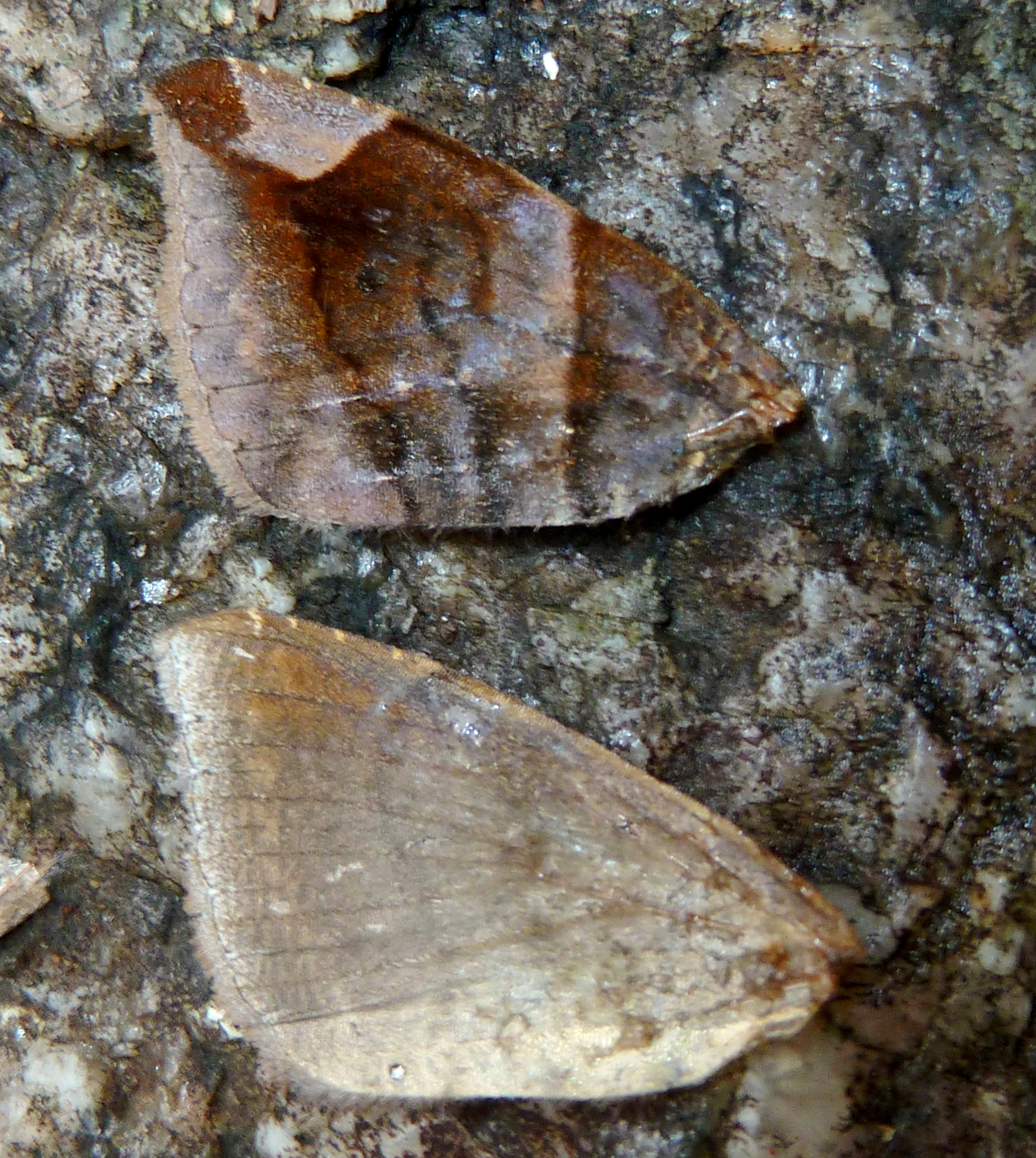

Scientific classification
- Kingdom: Animalia
- Phylum: Arthropoda
- Class: Insecta
- Order: Lepidoptera
- Superfamily: Noctuoidea
- Family: Erebidae
- Genus: Bastilla
- Species: B. proxima

Binomial name
- Bastilla proxima (Hampson, 1902)

Synonyms
- Parallelia proxima; Ophiusa proxima Hampson, 1902; Parallela conjuncturana Strand, 1918; Dysgonia conjuncturana (Strand, 1918); Dysgonia proxima (Hampson, 1902)

= Bastilla proxima =

Species of moth

Bastilla proxima is a moth of the family Noctuidae first described by George Hampson in 1902. It is found in Africa, including South Africa and Zaire.

The larvae feed on Antidesma species.
