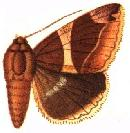

Scientific classification
- Kingdom: Animalia
- Phylum: Arthropoda
- Class: Insecta
- Order: Lepidoptera
- Superfamily: Noctuoidea
- Family: Erebidae
- Genus: Bastilla
- Species: B. dicoela

Binomial name
- Bastilla dicoela (Turner, 1909)

Synonyms
- Parallelia dicoela (Turner, 1909); Dysgonia dicoela Turner, 1909

= Bastilla dicoela =

Species of moth

Bastilla dicoela is a moth of the family Noctuidae first described by Alfred Jefferis Turner in 1909. It is found in the Australian state of Queensland.
