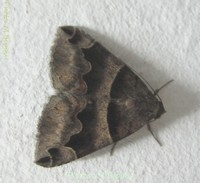

Scientific classification
- Kingdom: Animalia
- Phylum: Arthropoda
- Class: Insecta
- Order: Lepidoptera
- Superfamily: Noctuoidea
- Family: Erebidae
- Genus: Bastilla
- Species: B. angularis

Binomial name
- Bastilla angularis (Boisduval, 1833)

Synonyms
- Ophiusa angularis Boisduval, 1833; Caranilla angularis (Boisduval, 1833); Dysgonia angularis (Boisduval, 1833)

= Bastilla angularis =

Species of moth

Bastilla angularis is a moth of the family Noctuidae first described by Jean Baptiste Boisduval in 1833. It has an Oriental and Panafrican distribution. India (Bihar & Jharkhand), it is found in Eswatini, Gabon, Cabo Verde, São Tomé, Réunion and Madagascar.

The adults have a wingspan of about 40 mm. The larvae feed on Phyllanthus species.
