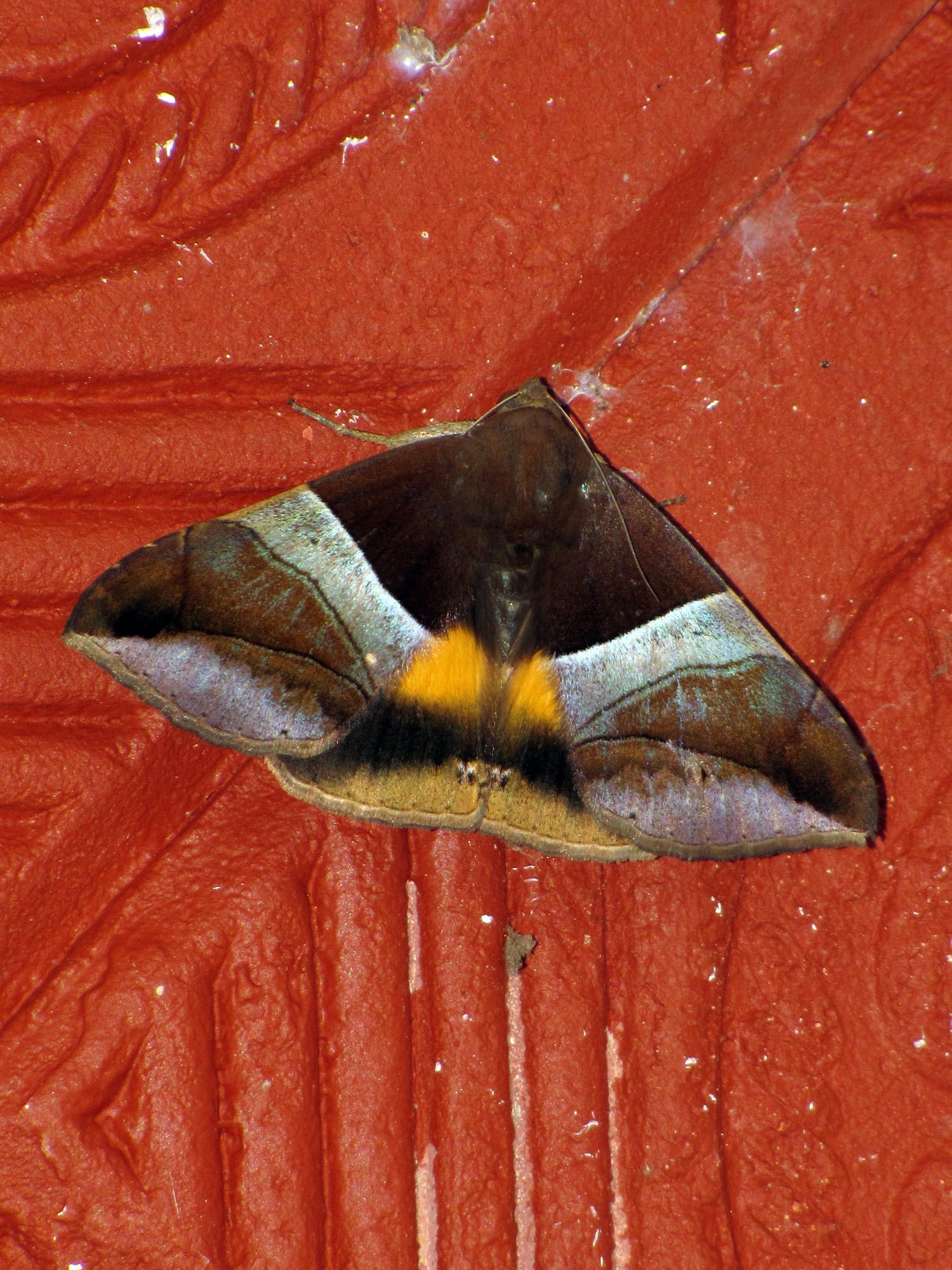

Scientific classification
- Kingdom: Animalia
- Phylum: Arthropoda
- Clade: Pancrustacea
- Class: Insecta
- Order: Lepidoptera
- Superfamily: Noctuoidea
- Family: Erebidae
- Genus: Bastilla
- Species: B. fulvotaenia

Binomial name
- Bastilla fulvotaenia (Guenée, 1852)

Synonyms
- Ophiusa fulvotaenia Guenée, 1852; Ophiusa absorpta Warren, 1913; Ophiusa contracta Warren, 1913; Ophiusa unipuncta Warren, 1913; Parallelia fulvotaenia Guenée; Holloway, 1976; Dysgonia unipuncta (Warren, 1913); Dysgonia contracta (Warren, 1913); Dysgonia fulvotaenia (Moore, 1877)

= Bastilla fulvotaenia =

Species of moth

Bastilla fulvotaenia is a moth of the family Noctuidae. It is found from the Indian subregion and Sri Lanka, Taiwan to Lombok, Seram and Buru. Adult is a fruit-piercer.

== Description ==
Its wingspan is about 70–80 mm. Males with a cleft running the whole length of the mid-tibia and containing a mass of flocculent scales. Body reddish brown. Forewings with purplish suffused medial band and postmedial line dark throughout, and with an indistinct dentate line beyond it. Hindwings with a medial orange band, which is wide towards costa.

The larvae feed on Glochidion species.
