= Bastilla cuneilineata =

Scientific classification
- Kingdom: Animalia
- Phylum: Arthropoda
- Class: Insecta
- Order: Lepidoptera
- Superfamily: Noctuoidea
- Family: Erebidae
- Genus: Bastilla
- Species: B. cuneilineata

Binomial name
- Bastilla cuneilineata (Warren, 1915)

Synonyms
- Ophiusa cuneilineata Warren, 1915; Dysgonia cuneilineata (Warren, 1915)

Species of moth

Bastilla cuneilineata is a moth of the family Noctuidae first described by William Warren in 1915. It is found in New Caledonia, the Loyalty Islands and Vanuatu.
