= Bastilla derogans =

Scientific classification
- Kingdom: Animalia
- Phylum: Arthropoda
- Class: Insecta
- Order: Lepidoptera
- Superfamily: Noctuoidea
- Family: Erebidae
- Genus: Bastilla
- Species: B. derogans

Binomial name
- Bastilla derogans (Walker, 1858)

Synonyms
- Ophiusa derogans Walker, 1858; Parallelia derogans (Walker, 1858); Dysgonia derogans (Walker, 1858)

Species of moth

Bastilla derogans is a moth of the family Noctuidae first described by Francis Walker in 1858. It is found in Africa, including Eswatini, South Africa, Réunion, São Tomé and Príncipe.

The larvae feed on Pinus species.
