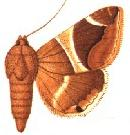

Scientific classification
- Kingdom: Animalia
- Phylum: Arthropoda
- Class: Insecta
- Order: Lepidoptera
- Superfamily: Noctuoidea
- Family: Erebidae
- Genus: Bastilla
- Species: B. analis

Binomial name
- Bastilla analis (Guenée, 1852)

Synonyms
- Ophiusa analis Guenée, 1852; Parallelia analis (Guenée, 1852); Dysgonia analis (Guenée, 1852)

= Bastilla analis =

Species of moth

Bastilla analis is a moth of the family Noctuidae. It is found in India, Sri Lanka, Myanmar, Java and China.

== Description ==
Its wingspan is about 50 mm. It is similar to Bastilla arctotaenia in the white band of the forewing being wider at the costa. The postmedial line more produced at vein 6, so that the white band on it is longer. The apical streak is straight and diffused towards the costa. Hindwings with a black and white spot on outer margin at vein 2.

The larvae feed on Phyllanthus species.
