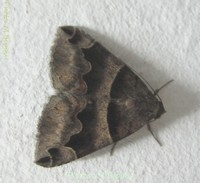

Scientific classification
- Kingdom: Animalia
- Phylum: Arthropoda
- Class: Insecta
- Order: Lepidoptera
- Superfamily: Noctuoidea
- Family: Erebidae
- Tribe: Poaphilini
- Genus: Bastilla; Swinhoe, 1918

Synonyms
- Caranilla Moore, 1885; Naxia Guenée, 1852; Xiana Nye, 1975

= Bastilla (moth) =

Genus of moths

Bastilla is a genus of moths in the family Erebidae. The genus was described by Charles Swinhoe in 1918.

== Taxonomy ==
Most species in the genus were formerly placed in the genus Dysgonia.

== Selected species ==
- Bastilla absentimacula (Guenée, 1852)
- Bastilla acuta (Moore, 1883)
- Bastilla amygdalis (Moore, 1885)
- Bastilla analis (Guenée, 1852)
- Bastilla angularis (Boisduval, 1833)
- Bastilla arcuata (Moore, 1877)
- Bastilla arctotaenia (Guenée, 1852)
- Bastilla axiniphora (Hampson, 1913)
- Bastilla binatang Holloway & Miller, 2003
- Bastilla circumsignata (Guenée, 1852)
- Bastilla copidiphora (Hampson, 1913)
- Bastilla crameri (Moore, 1885)
- Bastilla cuneilineata (Warren, 1915)
- Bastilla dentilinea (Bethune-Baker, 1906)
- Bastilla derogans (Walker, 1858)
- Bastilla dicoela (Turner, 1909)
- Bastilla duplicata (Robinson, 1975)
- Bastilla euryleuca (Prout, 1919)
- Bastilla flavipurpurea (Holloway, 1976)
- Bastilla flexilinea (Warren, 1915)
- Bastilla fulvotaenia (Guenée, 1852)
- Bastilla insularum (Orhant, 2002)
- Bastilla joviana (Stoll, 1782)
- Bastilla hamatilis (Guenée, 1852)
- Bastilla koroensis (Robinson, 1969)
- Bastilla lateritica (Holloway, 1979)
- Bastilla marquesanus (Collenette, 1928)
- Bastilla maturata (Walker, 1858)
- Bastilla maturescens (Walker, 1858)
- Bastilla missionarii (Hulstaert, 1924)
- Bastilla myops (Guenée, 1852)
- Bastilla nielseni Holloway & Miller, 2003
- Bastilla palpalis (Walker, 1865)
- Bastilla proxima (Hampson, 1902)
- Bastilla praetermissa (Warren, 1913)
- Bastilla solomonensis (Hampson, 1913)
- Bastilla simillima (Guenée, 1852)
- Bastilla subacuta (Bethune-Baker, 1906)
- Bastilla tahitiensis (Orhant, 2002)
- Bastilla vitiensis (Butler, 1886)
