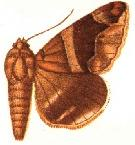

Scientific classification
- Kingdom: Animalia
- Phylum: Arthropoda
- Class: Insecta
- Order: Lepidoptera
- Superfamily: Noctuoidea
- Family: Erebidae
- Genus: Bastilla
- Species: B. vitiensis

Binomial name
- Bastilla vitiensis (Butler, 1886)

Synonyms
- Ophiusa vitiensis Butler, 1886; Parallelia vitiensis (Butler, 1886); Parallelia prouti Hulstaert, 1924; Parallelia cuneifascia Hulstaert, 1924; Dysgonia prouti (Hulstaert, 1924); Dysgonia cuneifascia (Hulstaert, 1924); Dysgonia vitiensis (Butler, 1886)

= Bastilla vitiensis =

Species of moth

Bastilla vitiensis is a moth of the family Noctuidae first described by Arthur Gardiner Butler in 1886. It is found from the Moluccas to Palau, Fiji, Samoa, Tonga and New Caledonia, Sulawesi, the Philippines, Borneo and Java.

Larvae have been recorded on Eucalyptus and Hibiscus, but this is atypical for the genus and needs verification.
