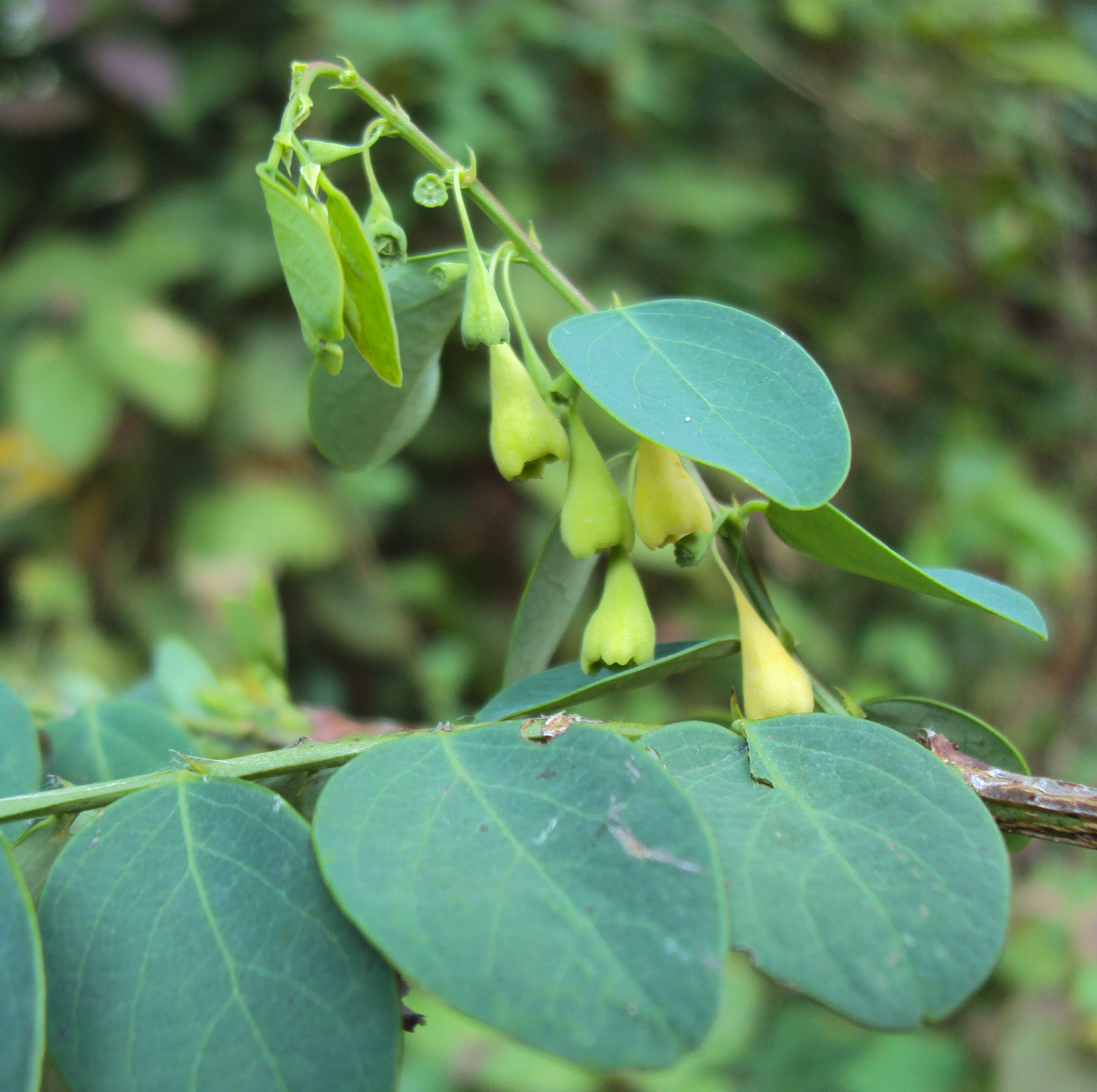

Conservation status
- Least Concern (IUCN 3.1)

Scientific classification
- Kingdom: Plantae
- Clade: Embryophytes
- Clade: Tracheophytes
- Clade: Angiosperms
- Clade: Eudicots
- Clade: Rosids
- Order: Malpighiales
- Family: Phyllanthaceae
- Genus: Breynia
- Species: B. retusa

Binomial name
- Breynia retusa (Dennst.) Alston

Synonyms
- Breynia angustifolia Hook.f.; Breynia hyposauropus Croizat; Breynia microphylla var. angustifolia (Hook.f.) Airy Shaw; Breynia patens (Roxb.) Rolfe; Breynia patens (Roxb.) Benth. & Hook. f.; Breynia turbinata (Oken) Cordem.; Flueggea retusa (Dennst.) Voigt; Melanthesa obliqua Wight; Melanthesa retusa (Dennst.) Kostel.; Melanthesa turbinata Oken; Melanthesopsis patens (Roxb.) Müll.Arg.; Melanthesopsis variabilis Müll.Arg.; Phyllanthus naviluri Miq. ex Müll.Arg.; Phyllanthus patens Roxb.; Phyllanthus pomaceus Moon; Phyllanthus retusus Dennst.; Phyllanthus turbinatus J.König ex Roxb. nom. illeg.; Sauropus elegantissimus Ridl.

= Breynia retusa =

Species of plant

Breynia retusa is a species of plant in the family Phyllanthaceae.

== Distribution ==
It grows naturally in Bangladesh, China, Bhutan, Cambodia, India, Laos, Malaysia (peninsular), Myanmar, Nepal, Sri Lanka, Thailand, Vietnam and Réunion where it is considered as an invasive weed.

The synonysation of Sauropus elegantissimus that is known to be endemic to Malaysia is disputed. Under this name, this plant is listed as critically endangered, but it is unclear what effect an updated taxonomy would have on that rating.

The plant has been recorded to be a host plant for the moth Buzara onelia in Maharashtra, India.

All parts of the plant are used in traditional medicine including for the treatment of dysentry, toothache and hastening suppuration. The chemical and nutritional composition of fruits and leaves of the plant have been deemed suitable and promising as a food additive towards preventing diabetes in humans.
