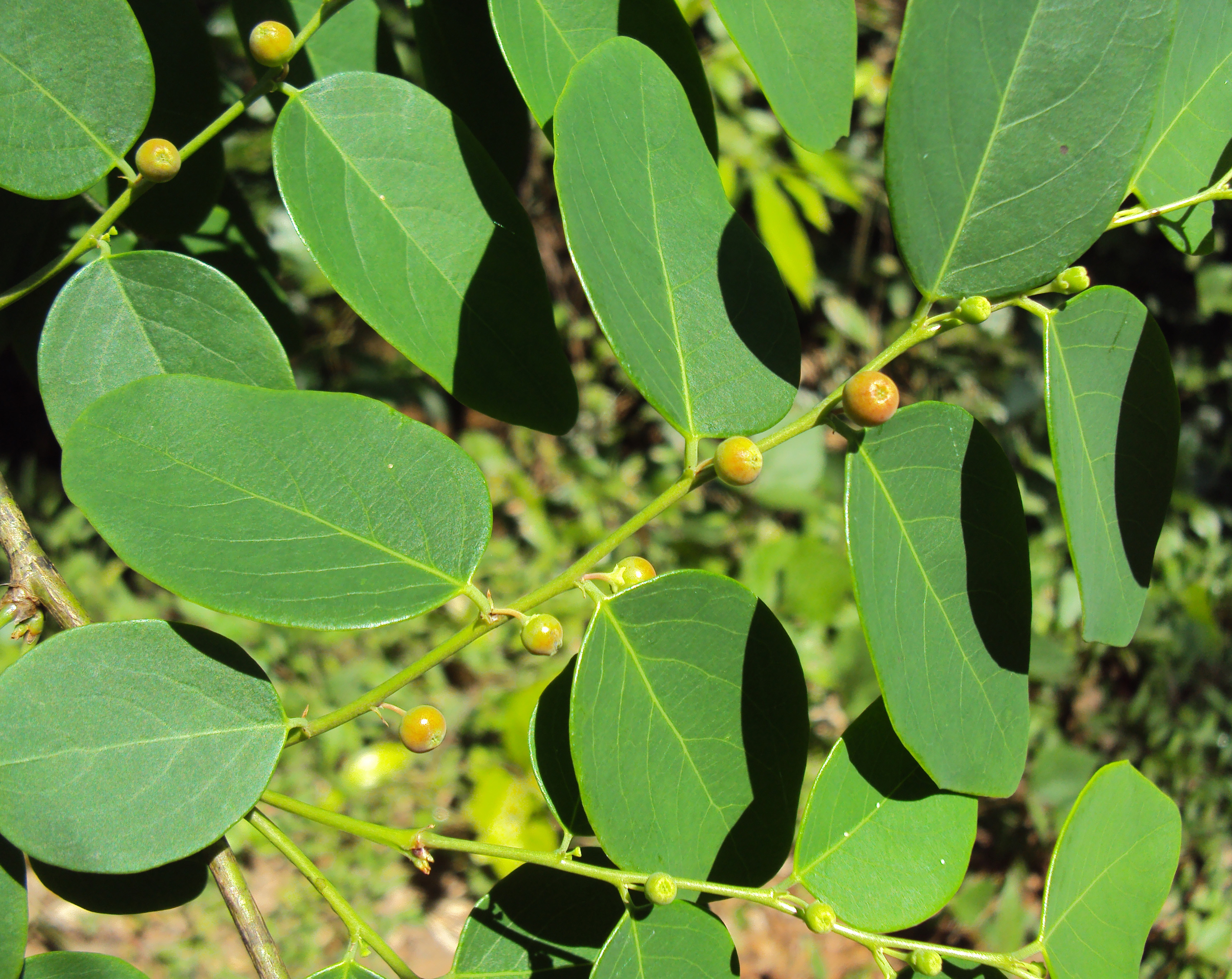

Conservation status
- Least Concern (IUCN 3.1)

Scientific classification
- Kingdom: Plantae
- Clade: Tracheophytes
- Clade: Angiosperms
- Clade: Eudicots
- Clade: Rosids
- Order: Malpighiales
- Family: Phyllanthaceae
- Genus: Breynia
- Species: B. vitis-idaea

Binomial name
- Breynia vitis-idaea (Burm.f.) C.E.C.Fisch.

Synonyms
- List: Breynia accrescens Hayata; Breynia formosana (Hayata) Hayata; Breynia keithii Ridl.; Breynia microcalyx Ridl.; Breynia officinalis Hemsl.; Breynia rhamnoides Müll.Arg. nom. illeg.; Melanthesa ovalifolia Kostel.; Melanthesa rhamnoides Blume nom. illeg.; Phyllanthus calycinus Wall. nom. inval.; Phyllanthus rhamnoides Retz. nom. illeg.; Phyllanthus rhamnoides Willd.; Phyllanthus sepiarius Roxb. ex Wall. nom. inval.; Phyllanthus tinctorius Vahl ex Baill.; Phyllanthus tristis A.Juss.; Phyllanthus vitis-idea (Burm.f.) D.Koenig ex Roxb.; Rhamnus vitis-idaea Burm.f.

= Breynia vitis-idaea =

Species of flowering plant

Breynia vitis-idaea, the officinal breynia, is a perennial tree-like species of Phyllanthaceae (Euphorbiaceae s.l.), found from India east to Taiwan and Okinawa and south to Indonesia. It is a shrub or treelet with egg-shaped leaves that can reach up to 3 m tall. It has staminate flowers and spherical, red fruit.

Breynia vitis-idaea is pollinated by the leafflower moth Epicephala vitisidaea in Fujian, China and the Ryukyu Archipelago, Japan. The moth actively pollinates the flowers, but lays an egg into the space between the external carpel wall and the tepals. The moth caterpillars consume a subset of the tree's seeds, receiving nourishment in return.

It contains the saponin breynin and terpenic and phenolic glycosides. It is marketed in Taiwan as Chi R Yun.

== Toxicity ==
Breynia vitis-idaea poisoning causes hepatocellular liver injury.

== Other names ==
Breynia officinalis Hemsley and B. officinalis var. accrescens (Hayata) M.J.Deng & J.C.Wang are synonyms of B. vitis-idaea.

Other variants include:

- Breynia formosana (Hayata) Hayata
- Breynia officinalis Hemsley var. officinalis
- Breynia stipitata Muell. -Arg. var. formosana Hayata
- Breynia stipitata Muell. -Arg. var. formosana Hayata

Other common names in English include:

- Formosan breynia
- Large calyx breynia
- Medicinal breynia

Common names in other languages include:

- Vietnamese: Cù đề
- Min Nan Chinese: 紅心仔 Âng-sim-á, 紅珠仔 Âng-chu-á, 紅仔珠 Âng-á-chu
- Chinese: 七日暈; lit. '7-day dizziness'
- Paiwan: Takaha'do
- Malay: Hujan panas, semomah, seruyan
- Tagalog: Matangulang
- Cebuano: Sungut-olang
- Tausug: Santing
- Thai: เพี้ยะฟาน (phiafān; [pʰíaʔ faːn]), ดับพิษ (dapphit; [dàp pʰít]) (northern), ก้างปลาทะเล (kāngplāthalē; [kâːŋ plaː tʰáʔ leː]), ผักหวานตัวผู้ (phakwāntūaphū; [pʰàk wǎːn tuːa pʰûː]) (central)
- Japanese: 大島小判の木 / オオシマコバンノキ / おおしまこばんのき (Ōshima kobannoki), 台湾小判の木 / タイワンコバンノキ / たいわんこばんのき (Taiwan kobannoki), 姫小判の木 / ヒメコバンノキ / ひめこばんのき (Hime kobannoki), 高砂小判の木 / タカサゴコバンノキ / こばんのき (Takasago kobannoki)
