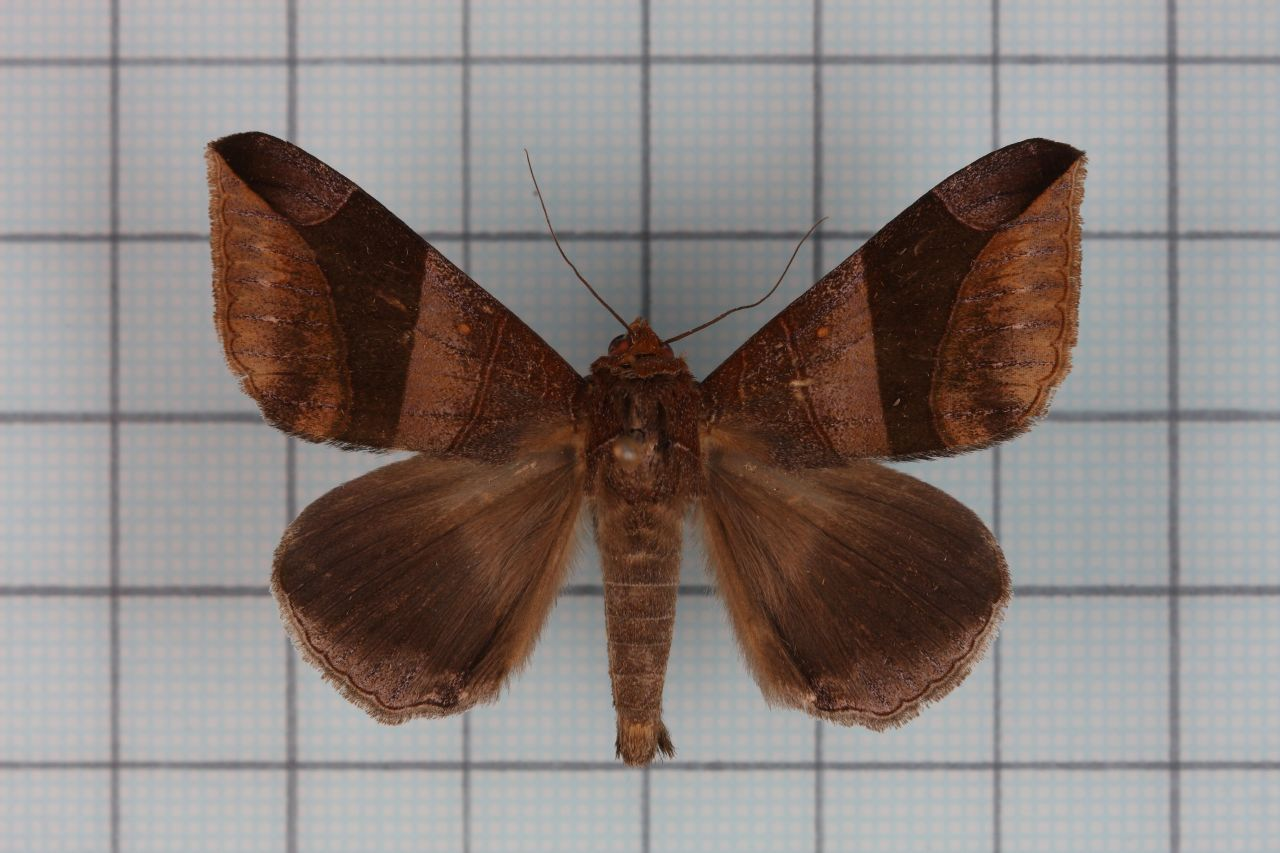

Scientific classification
- Kingdom: Animalia
- Phylum: Arthropoda
- Class: Insecta
- Order: Lepidoptera
- Superfamily: Noctuoidea
- Family: Erebidae
- Genus: Bastilla
- Species: B. maturata

Binomial name
- Bastilla maturata (Walker, 1858)

Synonyms
- Ophisma maturata Walker, 1858; Ophiusa falcata Moore, 1882; Parallelia maturata Walker; Holloway, 1976; Dysgonia falcata (Moore, 1882); Dysgonia maturata (Walker, 1858)

= Bastilla maturata =

Species of moth

Bastilla maturata is a moth of the family Erebidae first described by Francis Walker in 1858. It is found in the north-eastern parts of the Himalayas, southern China, Japan, Thailand, Peninsular Malaysia, Sumatra and Borneo.
