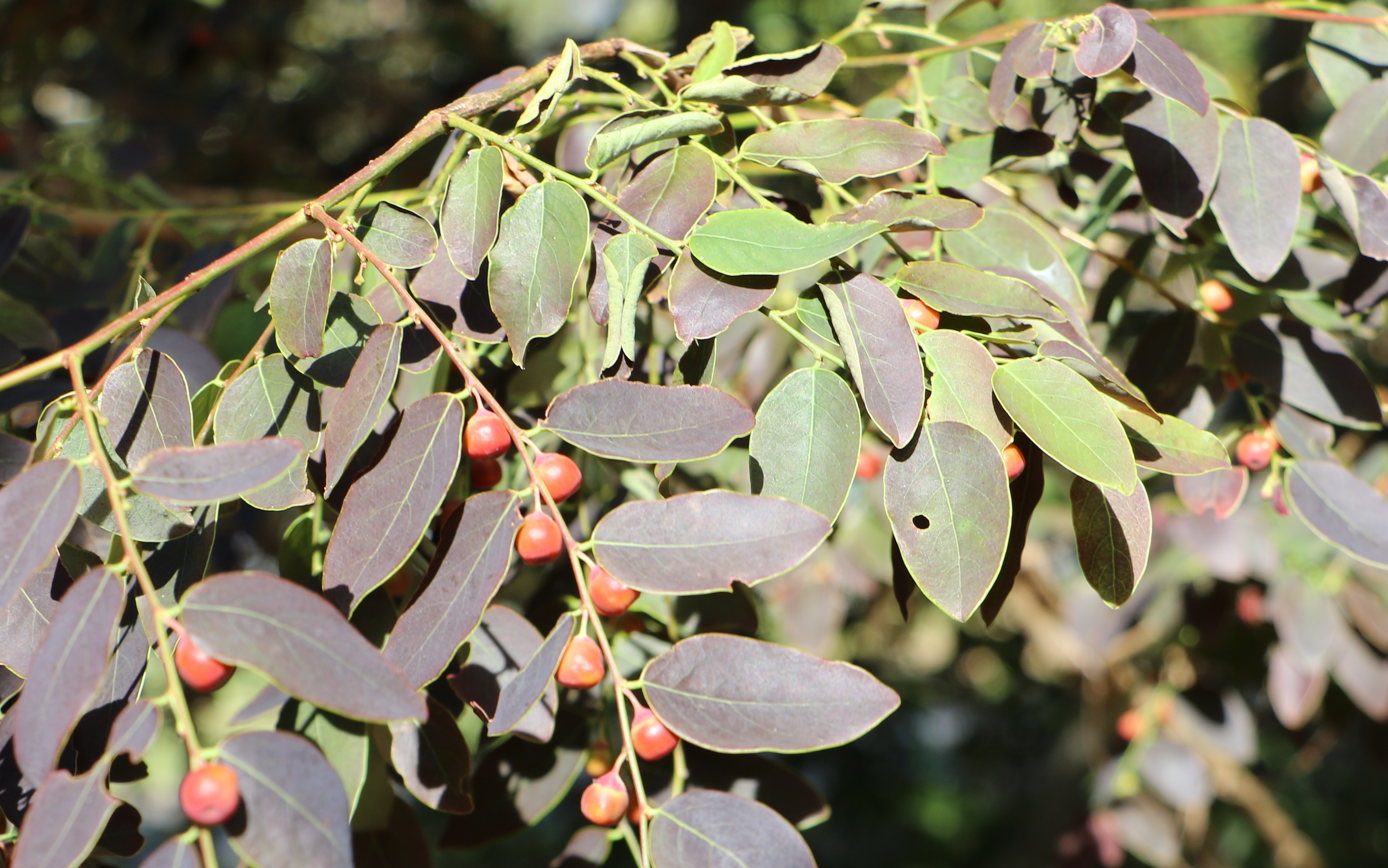
- Breynia cernua fruit and foliage.

Scientific classification
- Kingdom: Plantae
- Clade: Tracheophytes
- Clade: Angiosperms
- Clade: Eudicots
- Clade: Rosids
- Order: Malpighiales
- Family: Phyllanthaceae
- Genus: Breynia
- Species: B. cernua

Binomial name
- Breynia cernua (Poir.) Mull.Arg.

= Breynia cernua =

Species of flowering plant

Breynia cernua is a species of flowering plant that grows naturally in Australia and Malesia as a shrub up to 2 m (7 ft) in height. It is presumably dependent on leafflower moths (Epicephala spp.) for its pollination, like other species of tree in the genus Breynia. The species is known by the rather unfortunate name of fart bush.
