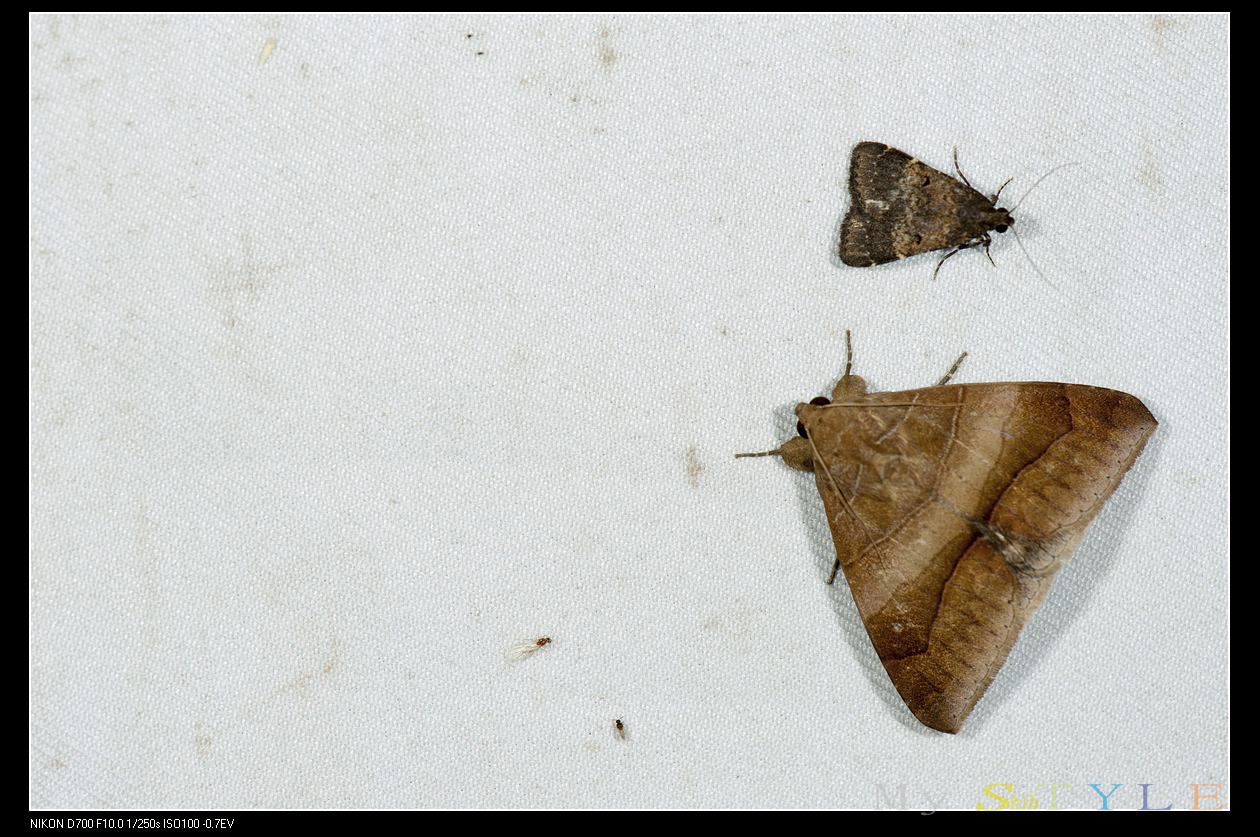

Scientific classification
- Kingdom: Animalia
- Phylum: Arthropoda
- Class: Insecta
- Order: Lepidoptera
- Superfamily: Noctuoidea
- Family: Erebidae
- Genus: Bastilla
- Species: B. absentimacula

Binomial name
- Bastilla absentimacula (Guenée, 1852)

Synonyms
- Naxia absentimacula Guenée, 1852; Dysgonia sylvestris (Strand, 1920); Parallelia silvestris Strand, 1920; Dysgonia absentimacula (Guenée, 1852)

= Bastilla absentimacula =

Species of moth

Bastilla absentimacula is a moth of the family Noctuidae. It is found from the Indian subregion to Sri Lanka, Andaman Islands, Taiwan, Java and New Guinea.

== Description ==
The wingspan is about 50–60 mm. A pale red-brown moth. Forewings with a broad greyish medial band with a straight dark line on its inner edge and a sinuous line on its outer. There is a slightly oblique and sinuous postmedial line present. A marginal pale specks series and marginal dark specks series also found. Hindwings pale fuscous. A broad diffused submarginal line can be seen, which is very wide at apex.

The larvae feed on Phyllanthus species.
