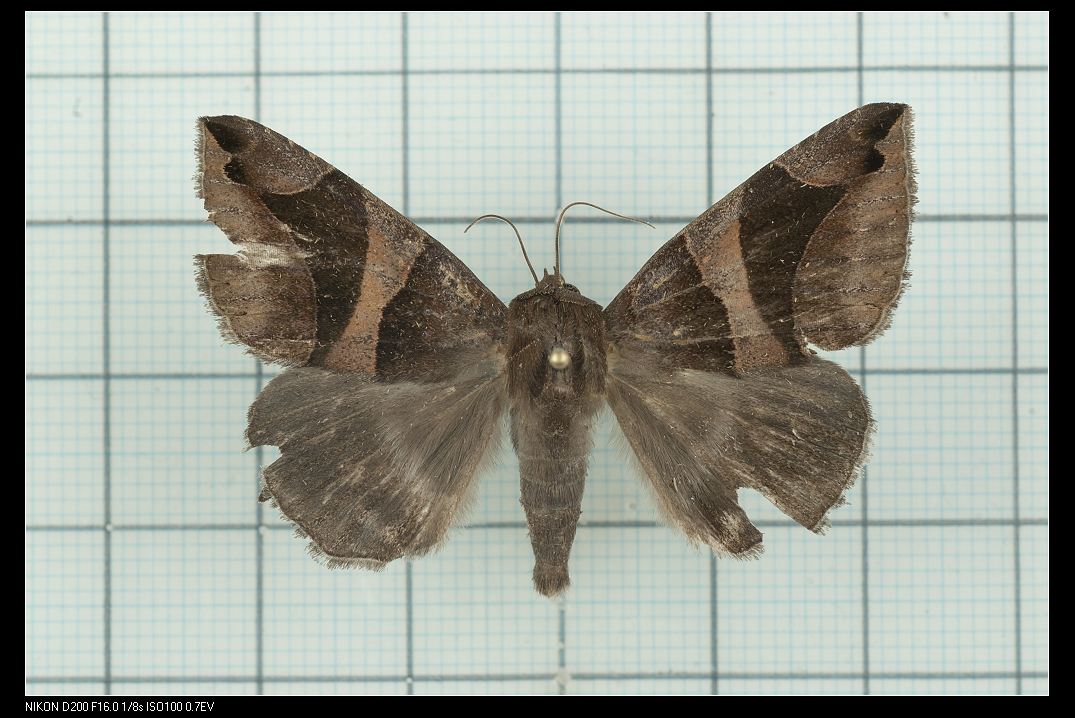

Scientific classification
- Kingdom: Animalia
- Phylum: Arthropoda
- Class: Insecta
- Order: Lepidoptera
- Superfamily: Noctuoidea
- Family: Erebidae
- Genus: Bastilla
- Species: B. arcuata

Binomial name
- Bastilla arcuata (Moore, 1877)

Synonyms
- Ophiusa arcuata Moore, 1877; Ophiusa joviana Guenée, 1852 (preocc.); Ophiusa guenei Snellen, 1880; Ophiusa curvata Leech, 1889; Parallia arcuata Moore; Kobes, 1985; Dysgonia guenei (Snellen, 1880); Dysgonia curvata (Leech, 1889); Dysgonia arcuata (Moore, 1877)

= Bastilla arcuata =

Species of moth

Bastilla arcuata is a moth of the family Noctuidaefirst described by Frederic Moore in 1877. It is found in the Oriental region of India, Sri Lanka, Myanmar, Sundaland, Seram, and New Guinea.

== Description ==
Its wingspan is about 48–54 mm. The antemedial line of the forewings is sinuous. A curved medial line was found beyond the violaceous band, meeting the angled postmedial line at the costa and inner margin. The outer edge of the oblique apical streak excised.

Larva has a brown head with whitish-yellow spots. The first two pairs of abdominal prolegs are rudimentary. An almost circular black spot is found on the front. The body is generally brown with dark spots. Setae on yellow chalazae are ringed with black. Two tubercles are salmon pink. The larvae feed on Glochidion and Phyllanthus species. Pupa with white efflorescence.
