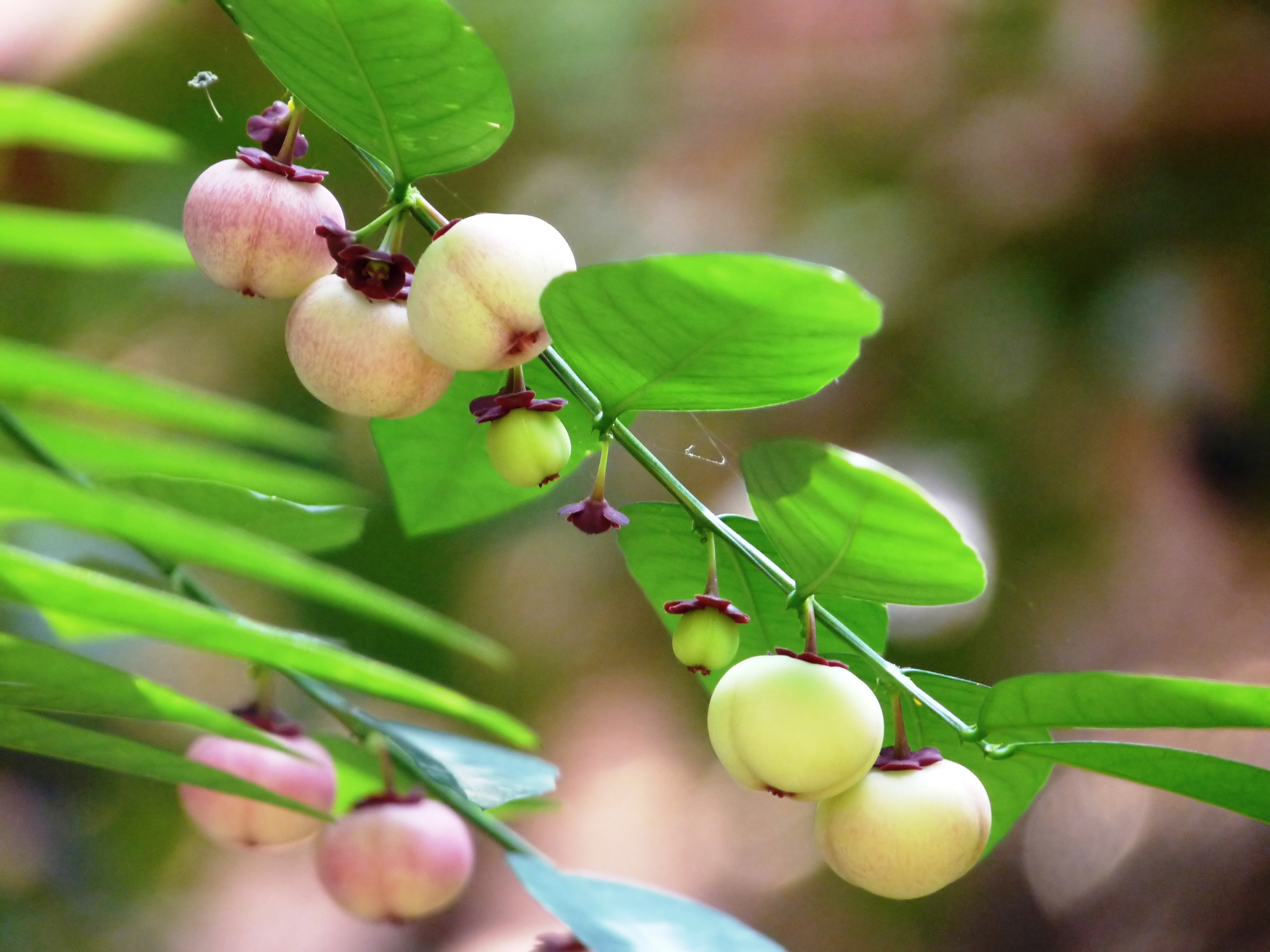

Conservation status
- Least Concern (IUCN 3.1)

Scientific classification
- Kingdom: Plantae
- Clade: Tracheophytes
- Clade: Angiosperms
- Clade: Eudicots
- Clade: Rosids
- Order: Malpighiales
- Family: Phyllanthaceae
- Genus: Phyllanthus
- Species: P. androgynus

Binomial name
- Phyllanthus androgynus (L.) Chakrab. & N.P.Balakr.

Synonyms
- Homotypic: Clutia androgyna L.; Aalius androgyna (L.) Kuntze; Breynia androgyna (L.) Chakrab. & N.P.Balakr.; Sauropus androgynus (L.) Merr.; Heterotypic: Aalius oblongifolia (Hook.f.) Kuntze; Aalius sumatrana (Miq.) Kuntze; Agyneia ovata Poir.; Andrachne ovata Lam. ex Poir.; Phyllanthus acidissimus Noronha, nom. nud.; Phyllanthus speciosus Noronha, nom. nud.; Phyllanthus strictus Roxb.; Sauropus albicans Blume; Sauropus albicans var. gardnerianus; Sauropus albicans var. genuinus Müll.Arg., not validly publ.; Sauropus albicans var. intermedius Müll.Arg.; Sauropus albicans var. zeylanicus (Wight) Müll.Arg.; Sauropus convexus J.J.Sm.; Sauropus gardnerianus Wight; Sauropus indicus Wight; Sauropus macranthus Fern.-Vill., nom. illeg.; Sauropus oblongifolius Hook.f.; Sauropus parviflorus Pax & K.Hoffm.; Sauropus scandens C.B.Rob.; Sauropus sumatranus Miq.; Sauropus zeylanicus Wight

= Phyllanthus androgynus =

Species of flowering plant

Phyllanthus androgynus, the star gooseberry or sweet leaf, is a species of plant in the family Phyllanthaceae. It is native to tropical and subtropical Asia and grown in some areas as a leaf vegetable.

== Description ==
It is a shrub with multiple upright stems, reaching up to 2.5 m (8 ft 2 in) tall and bearing dark green oval leaves about 5–6 cm (2.0–2.4 in) long.

== Distribution and habitat ==
It is native to India, Bangladesh, southern China (including Hainan) and Southeast Asia. It inhabits tropical and subtropical humid lowland forests, where it grows on brushy slopes and sunny forest margins from 100 to 400 m elevation.

Freshly picked leaves (especially mature leaves) contain high levels of provitamin A carotenoids, and also contain high levels of vitamins B and C, protein and minerals.

One study has suggested that excessive consumption of uncooked and juiced katuk leaves can cause lung damage due to its high concentrations of the alkaloid papaverine.

== Cultural usage ==
It is one of the most popular leafy vegetables in South and Southeast Asia and is notable for high yields and palatability. It can be cultivated specifically for edible asparagus-like stems using heavy fertilization, this cultivation variant is known as "Sabah vegetable." The stems are otherwise not edible.

=== Indonesia ===
In Indonesia, the flowers, leaves, and small purplish fruits of Phyllanthus androgynus have been consumed and used traditionally by the Javanese and Sundanese ethnic groups as the alternative medicine in a form of Jamu (traditional concoction native to Java island, originally formulated by the Javanese) to improve the circulation of blocked breast milk for breastfeeding mothers. According to modern research findings on the efficacy of this herb, indicates that the extract of the leaf increases the expression of prolactin and oxytocin genes 15 to 25 times in breastfeeding mice.

=== Malaysia ===
In Malaysia, it is commonly stir-fried with egg or dried anchovies.

=== Vietnam ===
In Vietnam, the shoot tips have been sold in cuisine and used similarly like the asparagus; the locals usually cook it with crab meat, minced pork or dried shrimp to make a soup.

== Medical ==
Various studies have confirmed that this plant has notable phytochemical constituents and various pharmacological activities including antioxidant, anti-inflammatory, and anti-obesity activities.

Although the exact cause is unknown, an association with bronchiolitis obliterans and the consumption of large quantities of uncooked leaves or raw juice leading to lung failure has been reported.

== Nutrition ==
This plant is a good source of provitamin A carotenoids, and vitamin C and vitamin B.

Breynia androgyna
Nutritional value per 100 g (3.5 oz)
- Energy: 245 kJ (59 kcal)
- Carbohydrates: 11 g
- Fat: 1 g
- Protein: 4.8 g
Vitamins and minerals
Vitamins	Quantity %DV^{†}
Vitamin A	10370 IU
Thiamine (B1)	8% 0.1 mg
Vitamin C	266% 239 mg
Minerals	Quantity %DV^{†}
Calcium	16% 204 mg
Iron	17% 3 mg
Phosphorus	8% 98 mg
- Other constituents: Quantity
- Water: 91.4 g
- ^{†}Percentages estimated using US recommendations for adults.

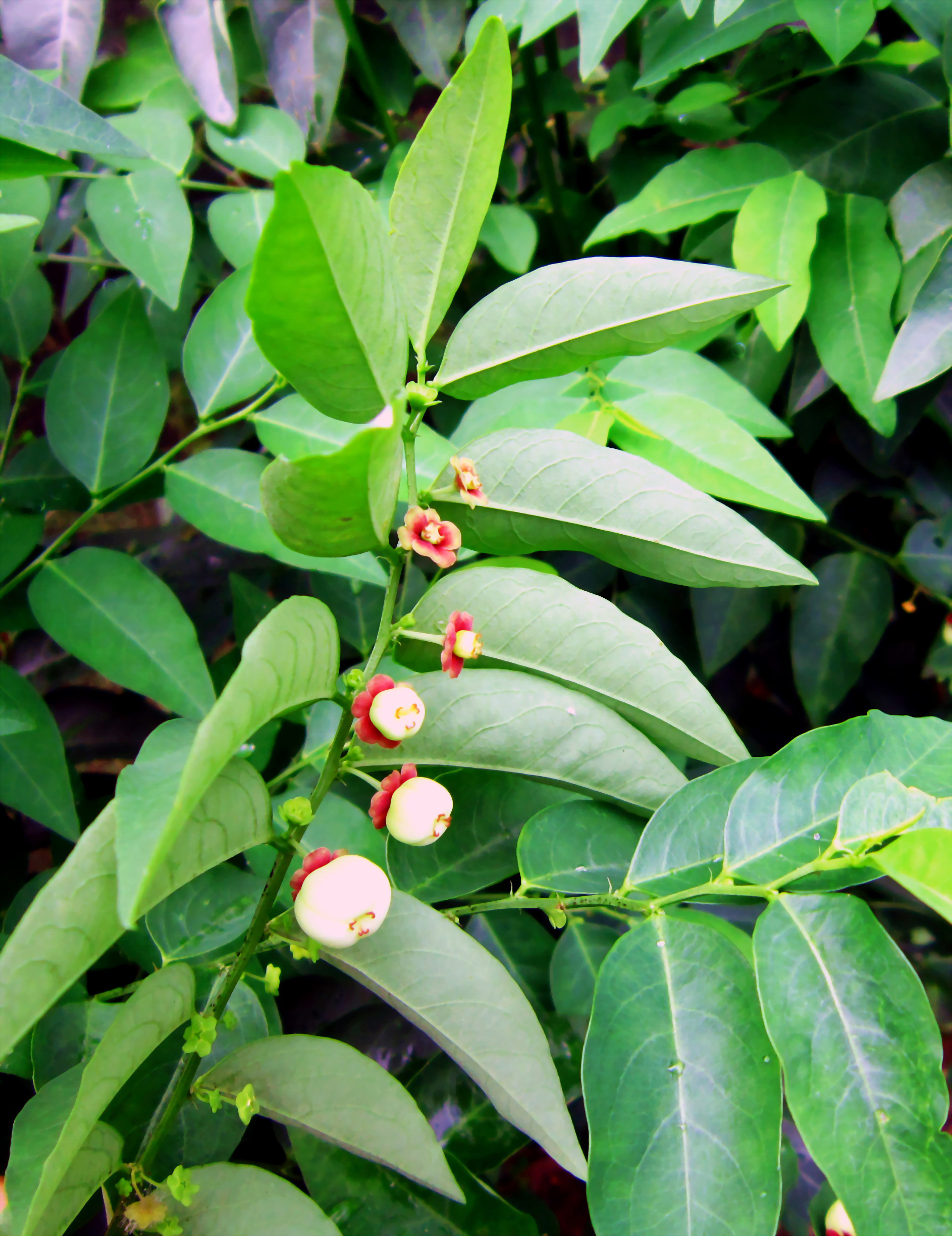
Leaves and fruit

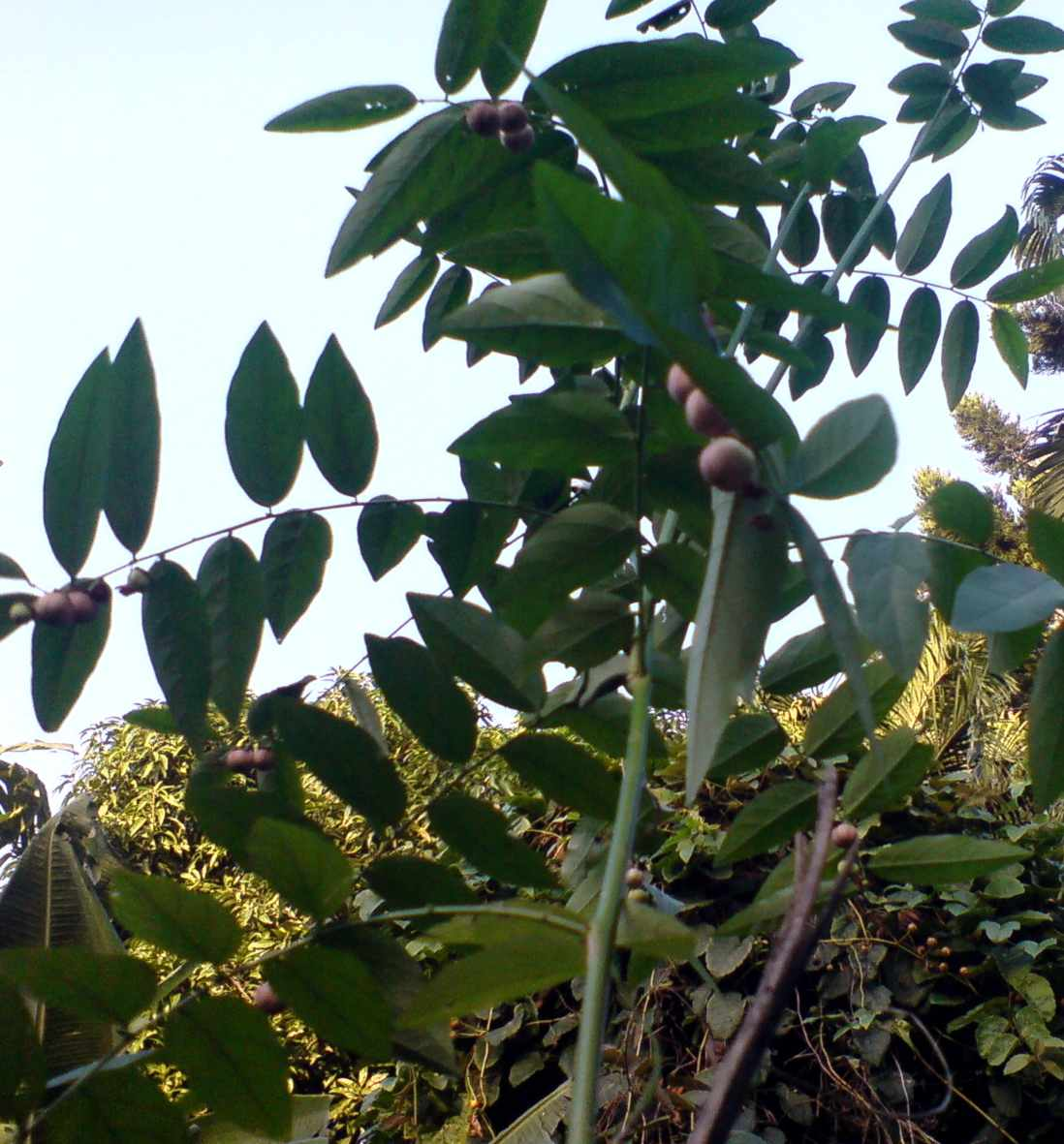
Foliage
