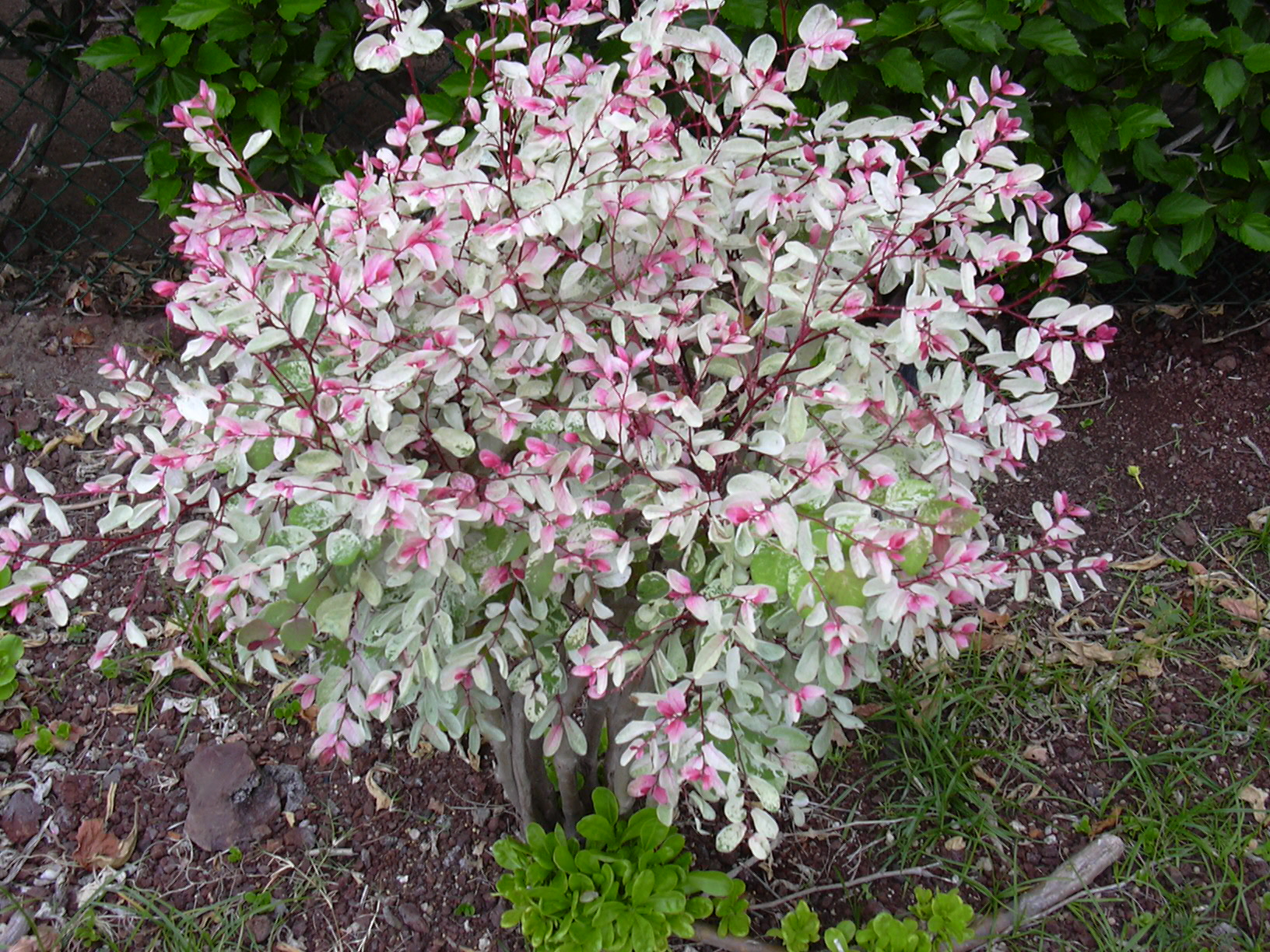
- Breynia disticha

Scientific classification
- Kingdom: Plantae
- Clade: Tracheophytes
- Clade: Angiosperms
- Clade: Eudicots
- Clade: Rosids
- Order: Malpighiales
- Family: Phyllanthaceae
- Subfamily: Phyllanthoideae
- Tribe: Phyllantheae
- Genus: Breynia; J.R.Forst. & G.Forst. (1776), nom. cons.

Species
- 93; see text

Synonyms
- Aalius Rumph. ex Kuntze (1891), nom. superfl.; Breyniopsis Beille (1925); Ceratogynum Wight (1852); Diplomorpha Griff. (1854), nom. illeg.; Foersteria Scop. (1777); Forsteria Steud. (1821); Heterocalymnantha Domin (1927); Melanthesa Blume (1826); Melanthesopsis Müll.Arg. (1863); Sauropus Blume (1826)

= Breynia =

Genus of flowering plants

Breynia is a genus in the flowering plant family Phyllanthaceae, first described in 1776. It is native to Southeast Asia, China, Réunion, the Indian Subcontinent, Papuasia and Australia.

The name Breynia is a conserved name, it is recognized despite the existence of an earlier use of the same name to refer to a different plant. Breynia L. 1753 is in the Capparaceae, but it is a rejected name. We here discuss Breynia J.R.Forst. & G.Forst. 1776.

In a 2006 revision of the Phyllanthaceae, it was recommended that Breynia be subsumed in Phyllanthus; however, new combinations in Phyllanthus for former Breynia species remain to be published.

Breynia are of special note in the fields of pollination biology and coevolution because they have a specialized mutualism with moths in the genus Epicephala (leafflower moths), in which the moths actively pollinate the flowers—thereby ensuring that the tree may produce viable seeds—but also lay eggs in the flowers' ovaries or in the space between the tepals and the carpel walls, from where their larvae consume a subset of the developing seeds as nourishment. Other species of Epicephala are pollinators, and in some cases, non-pollinating seed predators, of certain species of plants in the genera Phyllanthus and Glochidion, both closely related to Breynia. This relationship is similar to those between figs and fig wasps and yuccas and yucca moths.

== Species ==
93 species are accepted.

- Breynia amabilis (Airy Shaw) Welzen & Pruesapan
- Breynia amoebiflora (Airy Shaw) Welzen & Pruesapan
- Breynia androgyna (L.) Chakrab. & N.P.Balakr.
- Breynia assimilis (Thwaites) Chakrab. & N.P.Balakr.
- Breynia asteranthos (Airy Shaw) Welzen & Pruesapan
- Breynia asymmetrica (Welzen) Welzen & Pruesapan
- Breynia baudouinii Beille – Vietnam
- Breynia beillei Welzen & Pruesapan
- Breynia bicolor (Craib) Chakrab. & N.P.Balakr.
- Breynia bishnupadae (M.Gangop. & Chakrab.) Chakrab. & N.P.Balakr.
- Breynia bonii (Beille) Welzen & Pruesapan
- Breynia brevipes (Müll.Arg.) Chakrab. & N.P.Balakr.
- Breynia calcarea (M.R.Hend.) Welzen & Pruesapan – W Malaysia
- Breynia carnosa Welzen & Pruesapan – Vietnam
- Breynia cernua (Poir.) Müll.Arg. – Northern Territory of Australia, New Guinea, Solomon Islands, Sulawesi, Philippines, Borneo, Java
- Breynia collaris Airy Shaw – Papua New Guinea
- Breynia coriacea Beille – Vietnam
- Breynia coronata Hook.f. – Thailand, W Malaysia, Borneo, Sumatra
- Breynia delavayi (Croizat) Welzen & Pruesapan
- Breynia discigera Müll.Arg. – Thailand, W Malaysia, Sumatra
- Breynia discocalyx (Welzen) Welzen & Pruesapan
- Breynia disticha J.R.Forst. & G.Forst. – Vanuatu, New Caledonia; naturalized in West Indies, Florida, Gambia, and scattered oceanic islands
- Breynia diversifolia Beille – Vietnam
- Breynia fleuryi Beille – Vietnam
- Breynia fruticosa (L.) Müll.Arg. – Vietnam, Thailand, S China
- Breynia garrettii (Craib) Chakrab. & N.P.Balakr.
- Breynia glauca Craib – Thailand, Myanmar, Laos, Borneo
- Breynia gour-maitii (Chakrab. & M.Gangop.) Chakrab. & N.P.Balakr.
- Breynia grandiflora Beille – Vietnam
- Breynia granulosa (Airy Shaw) Welzen & Pruesapan
- Breynia gynophora Welzen & Pruesapan
- Breynia harmandii (Beille) Welzen & Pruesapan
- Breynia heteroblasta (Airy Shaw) Welzen & Pruesapan
- Breynia heyneana J.J.Sm. – Lesser Sunda Islands in Indonesia
- Breynia hiemalis Huan C.Wang & Feng Yang
- Breynia hirsuta (Beille) Welzen & Pruesapan
- Breynia indosinensis Beille – Vietnam, Laos
- Breynia kerrii (Airy Shaw) Welzen & Pruesapan
- Breynia kitanovii (Thin) Welzen & Pruesapan
- Breynia lanceolata (Hook.f.) Welzen & Pruesapan
- Breynia lithophila Welzen & Pruesapan – Thailand
- Breynia macrantha (Hassk.) Chakrab. & N.P.Balakr.
- Breynia maichauensis (Thin) Welzen & Pruesapan
- Breynia massiei Beille – Laos
- Breynia micrasterias (Airy Shaw) Welzen & Pruesapan
- Breynia microphylla (Kurz ex Teijsm. & Binn.) Müll.Arg. – Sumatera, Java, Sulawesi
- Breynia mollis J.J.Sm. – New Guinea
- Breynia oblongifolia (Müll.Arg.) Müll.Arg. – Papua New Guinea, Queensland, New South Wales, Northern Territory
- Breynia obscura Welzen & Pruesapan – W Malaysia
- Breynia officinalis Hemsl.
- Breynia orbicularis (Craib) Welzen & Pruesapan
- Breynia phongquangensis T. H. Bui (Thu Ha Bui) and N. H. Le (Ngoc Han Le)
- Breynia pierrei (Beille) Welzen & Pruesapan
- Breynia platycalyx Airy Shaw – W New Guinea
- Breynia po-khantii (Chakrab. & M.Gangop.) Chakrab. & N.P.Balakr.
- Breynia podocarpa Airy Shaw – Papua New Guinea, Northern Territory
- Breynia poilanei (Beille) Welzen & Pruesapan
- Breynia poomae (Welzen & Chayam.) Welzen & Pruesapan
- Breynia pseudorostrata Huan C.Wang & Feng Yang
- Breynia pubescens Merr. – Maluku
- Breynia pulchella (Airy Shaw) Welzen & Pruesapan
- Breynia quadrangularis (Willd.) Chakrab. & N.P.Balakr.
- Breynia racemosa (Blume) Müll.Arg. – Andaman & Nicobar Islands, Thailand, Myanmar, W Malaysia, Sumatra, Java, Lesser Sunda Islands, Philippines, New Guinea, Bismarck Archipelago
- Breynia repanda (Müll.Arg.) Chakrab. & N.P.Balakr.
- Breynia repens Welzen & Pruesapan – Thailand
- Breynia reticulata (S.L.Mo ex P.T.Li) Welzen & Pruesapan
- Breynia retroversa (Wight) Chakrab. & N.P.Balakr.
- Breynia retusa (Dennst.) Alston – Réunion, India, Tibet, Sri Lanka, Nepal, Bhutan, E Himalayas, Myanmar, Thailand, Vietnam, W Malaysia
- Breynia rhynchocarpa Benth. – Northern Territory of Australia
- Breynia rigida (Thwaites) Chakrab. & N.P.Balakr.
- Breynia rostrata Merr. – Vietnam, S China
- Breynia saksenana (Manilal, Prasann. & Sivar.) Chakrab. & N.P.Balakr.
- Breynia septata Beille – Vietnam
- Breynia shawii (Welzen) Welzen & Pruesapan
- Breynia similis (Craib) Welzen & Pruesapan
- Breynia spatulifolia (Beille) Welzen & Pruesapan
- Breynia stipitata Müll.Arg. – Northern Territory, Queensland
- Breynia subangustifolia Thin – Vietnam
- Breynia suberosa (Airy Shaw) Welzen & Pruesapan
- Breynia subindochinensis Thin – Vietnam
- Breynia subterblanca (C.E.C.Fisch.) C.E.C.Fisch.
- Breynia temii (Welzen & Chayam.) Welzen & Pruesapan
- Breynia thoii (Thin) Welzen & Pruesapan
- Breynia thorelii (Beille) Welzen & Pruesapan
- Breynia thyrsiflora (Welzen) Welzen & Pruesapan
- Breynia tiepii Welzen & Pruesapan
- Breynia tonkinensis Beille – Vietnam
- Breynia trinervia (Hook.f. & Thomson ex Müll.Arg.) Chakrab. & N.P.Balakr.
- Breynia tsiangii (P.T.Li) Welzen & Pruesapan
- Breynia vestita Warb. – New Guinea, Kai Island in Maluku Province of Indonesia
- Breynia villosa (Blanco) Welzen & Pruesapan
- Breynia virgata (Blume) Müll.Arg. – Sumatra, Java, Lesser Sunda Islands
- Breynia vitis-idaea (Burm.f.) C.E.C.Fisch. – China, Ryukyu Islands, Taiwan, Indochina, Andaman & Nicobar Islands, India, Bangladesh, Pakistan, Sri Lanka, W Malaysia, Sumatra, Philippines
- Breynia yanhuiana (P.T.Li) Welzen & Pruesapan
