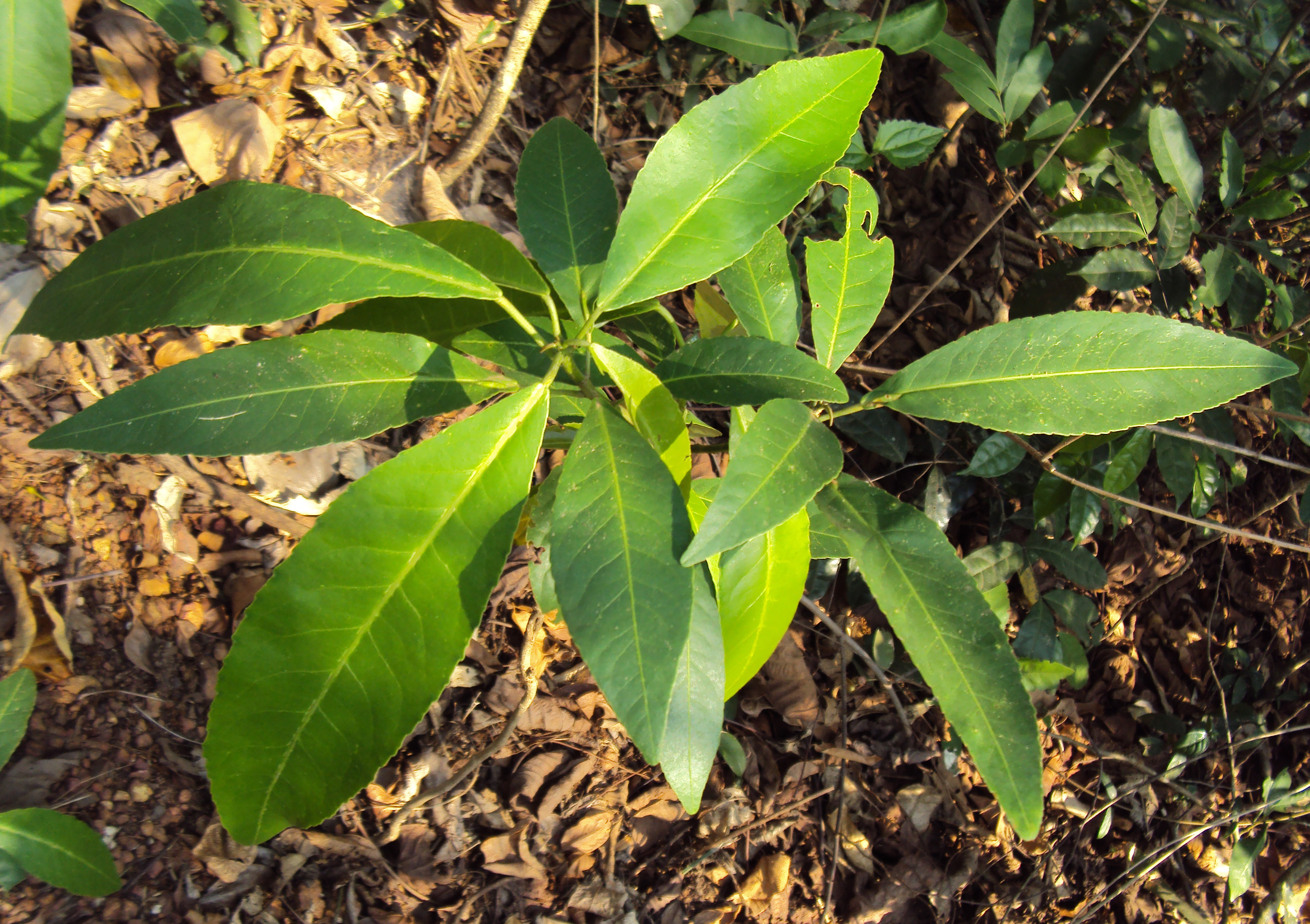

Scientific classification
- Kingdom: Plantae
- Clade: Embryophytes
- Clade: Tracheophytes
- Clade: Spermatophytes
- Clade: Angiosperms
- Clade: Eudicots
- Clade: Rosids
- Order: Malpighiales
- Family: Euphorbiaceae
- Genus: Croton
- Species: C. persimilis

Binomial name
- Croton persimilis Müll.Arg.

Synonyms
- Croton mangelong Y.T.Chang; Croton oblongifolius Roxb.; Croton roxburghii N.P.Balakr.; Croton virbalae M.R.Almeida; Oxydectes oblongifolia Kuntze; Oxydectes persimilis (Müll.Arg.) Kuntze

= Croton persimilis =

Species of plant from Asia

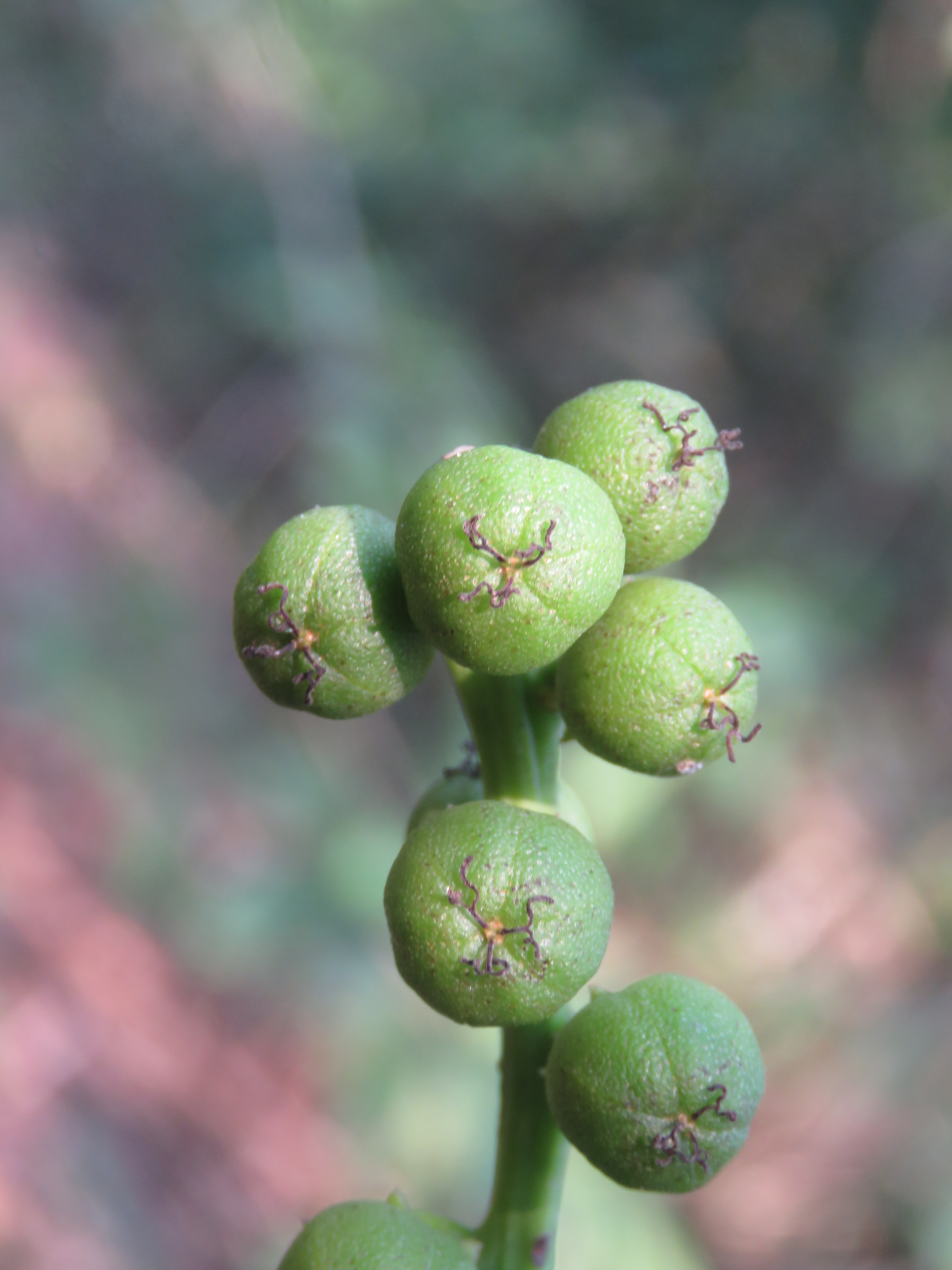
Croton persimilis fruit at Peravoor, Kerala, India

Croton persimilis is a species of tree in the Euphorbiaceae family. It is native to an area from Thailand in mainland Southeast Asia to southern Yunnan, China, and to the Indian subcontinent. It is a pioneer species with a short life span. The plant is used in the traditional medicines of various peoples.

== Description ==
This tree has leaves that are either coarsely dentate, serrate or crenate, prominently-lobed subglobose fruit some 10 x 8–12 mm in size, and peltate/shield-like indumentum (hair covering on the plant), with rays of scales radiating in 1 plane (at least 80% webbing, rays free of such for only some 20% of total length).

== Distribution ==
This species is native to Mainland Southeast Asia, southern Yunnan (Zhōngguó/China) and the Indian subcontinent. Countries and regions in which it occurs include: Thailand; Cambodia; Vietnam; Zhōngguó/China (southern Yunnan); Laos, Myanmar; India (including Assam); Bangladesh; East Himalaya; Sri Lanka

== Habitat and ecology ==
The tree is a pioneer species, with a short lifespan.

The tree is a pollen source for stingless bee species in the Lepidotrigona, Tetragonilla and Tetragonula genera at Nam Nao National Park, Phetchabun Province, northern Thailand. The tree occurs in bamboo-deciduous forest and deciduous dipterocarp-oak forest in the park.

In the utilized edge of montane evergreen forest of Doi Suthep–Pui National Park, Chiang Mai Province, northern Thailand, the dominant species were Glochidion lanceolarium, Litsea beusekomii, Schima wallichii, Erythrina stricta, Macaranga indica, Staphylea cochinchinensis, C. persimilis, Pinus kesiya, Litsea martabanica, and Clausena excavata.

This is a host plant for the Eriophyoidea mite Cosella crotoni in Thailand.

The plant is the most abundant tree in the peripheral zone of Kuldiha Wildlife Sanctuary, Odisha, India, it was pervasive in the buffer zone, but of far lesser presence in the core zone. These zones reflected human interference in the landscape. Other abundant trees in the peripheral zone were Shorea robusta, Glochidion lanceolarium, Caesalpinia digyna, Ziziphus oenoplia, Syzygium cumini and Stereospermum tetragonum. In the buffer zone, apart from C. persimilis, other abundant trees were Holarrhena pubescens, Macaranga peltata, S. robusta, Terminalia alata, and Pongamia pinnata.

== Vernacular names ==
- ទុំៃូង, thom pung are names for this species in Khmer language.
- plao yai, and รากเปล้าใหญ่are names used in Thailand for this plant.

== Uses ==
The leaves of the species are used in Thai traditional medicine for postpartum (after childbirth) care.

The bark and leaves, at times boiled, are used to treat a variety of ailments in Na Siao subdistrict, Chaiyaphum Province, northern Thailand.

Villagers living on the plateau of Phnom Kulen National Park, Siem Reap Province, northwestern Cambodia, use dried pieces of the trunk and branches to make a "green tea" to treat stomachache, and use the wood-chips mixed with other plants in a decoction for postpartum care.

Four ethnic groups living in the Wayanad District, Kerala, India, the Kattunaikkan, Kuruchiyar, Mullakuruman, and Adiyan people, use the plant to treat inflammation.

== History ==
The species was first described in 1865 by the Swiss botanist Johann Müller (1828–1896), known in botany (because of his sharing a quite common name) as Johannes Müller Argoviensis. He specialized in lichens. The description was published in the journal Linnaea; Ein Journal für die Botanik in ihrem ganzen Umfange, (Berlin). Justification of the broader spread of this description was published by the Indian botanists T. Chakrabarty and Nambiyath Puthansurayil Balakrishnan in their 2017 publication.
