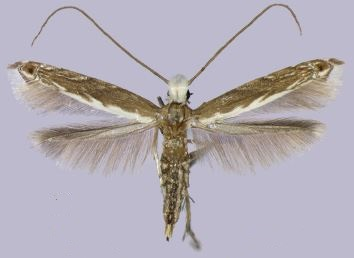

Scientific classification
- Domain: Eukaryota
- Kingdom: Animalia
- Phylum: Arthropoda
- Class: Insecta
- Order: Lepidoptera
- Family: Gracillariidae
- Genus: Epicephala
- Species: E. bipollenella

Binomial name
- Epicephala bipollenella Li, Wang & Zhang, 2012

= Epicephala bipollenella =

Species of moth

Epicephala bipollenella is a moth of the family Gracillariidae. It is found in Fujian, China and the Ryukyu Archipelago.

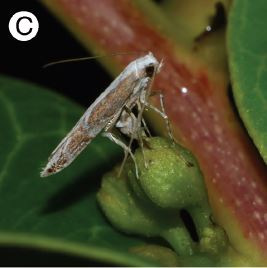
ovipositing through stylar pit of G. zeylanicum flower

The larvae feed on Glochidion hirsutum and Glochidion zeylanicum.
