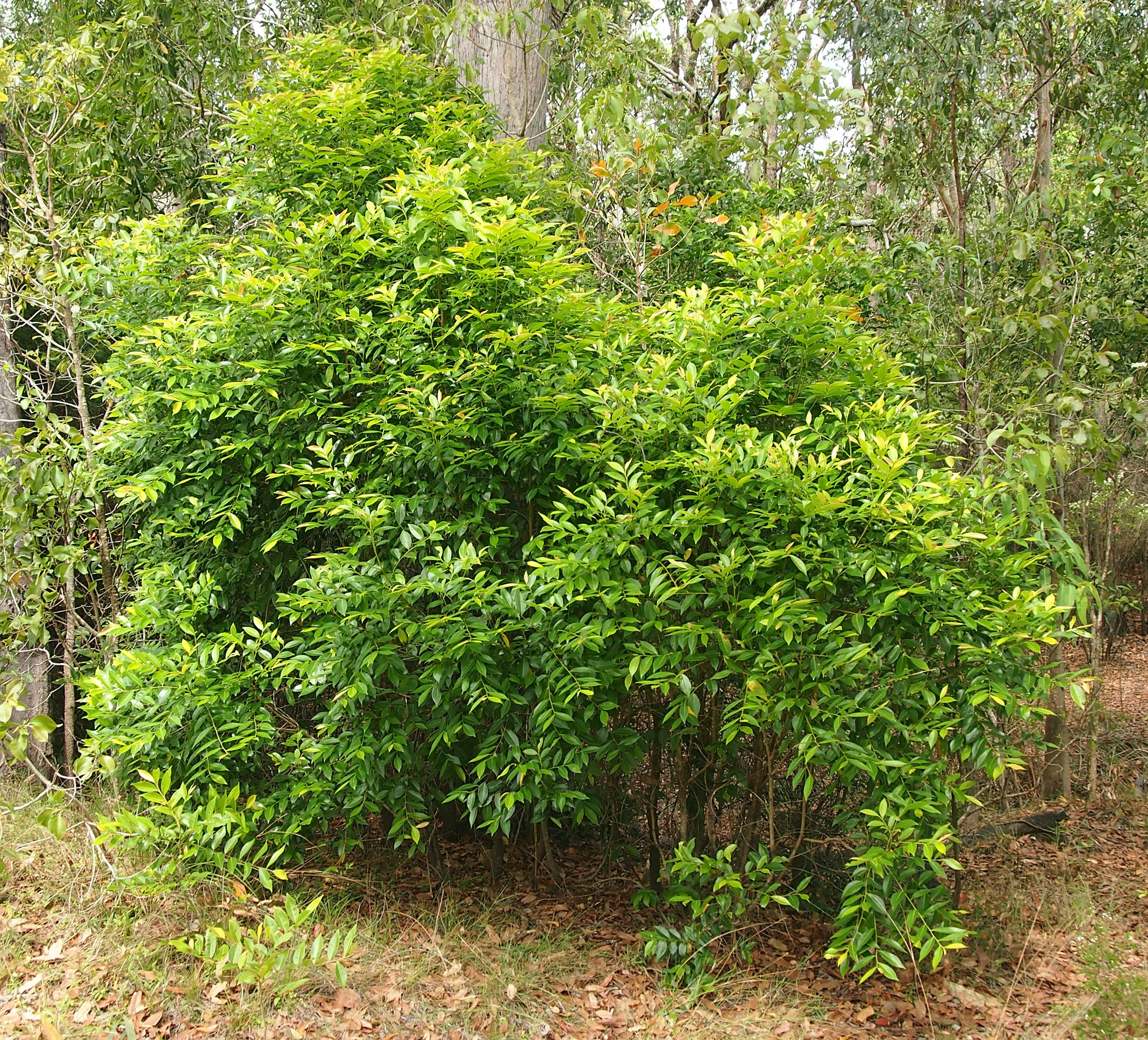
- Habit

Conservation status
- Least Concern (IUCN 3.1)

Scientific classification
- Kingdom: Plantae
- Clade: Embryophytes
- Clade: Tracheophytes
- Clade: Spermatophytes
- Clade: Angiosperms
- Clade: Eudicots
- Clade: Rosids
- Order: Malpighiales
- Family: Phyllanthaceae
- Genus: Phyllanthus
- Species: P. ferdinandi

Binomial name
- Phyllanthus ferdinandi Müll.Arg.

Synonyms
- Diasperus ferdinandi (Müll.Arg.) Kuntze; Glochidion ferdinandi (Müll.Arg.) F.M.Bailey; Glochidion ferdinandi var. minor Benth.; Glochidion ferdinandi var. pubens Maiden ex Airy Shaw; Phyllanthus ferdinandi var. minor Benth.

= Phyllanthus ferdinandi =

Species of tree

Phyllanthus ferdinandi, with common names that include cheese tree (see below), is a species of small to medium–sized trees, constituting part of the plant family Phyllanthaceae. They grow naturally across eastern Australia, from south–eastern New South Wales northwards to northern and inland Queensland, in rainforests and humid eucalypt forests. Frugivorous birds such as pigeons, figbirds and parrots consume its fruit.

== Description ==
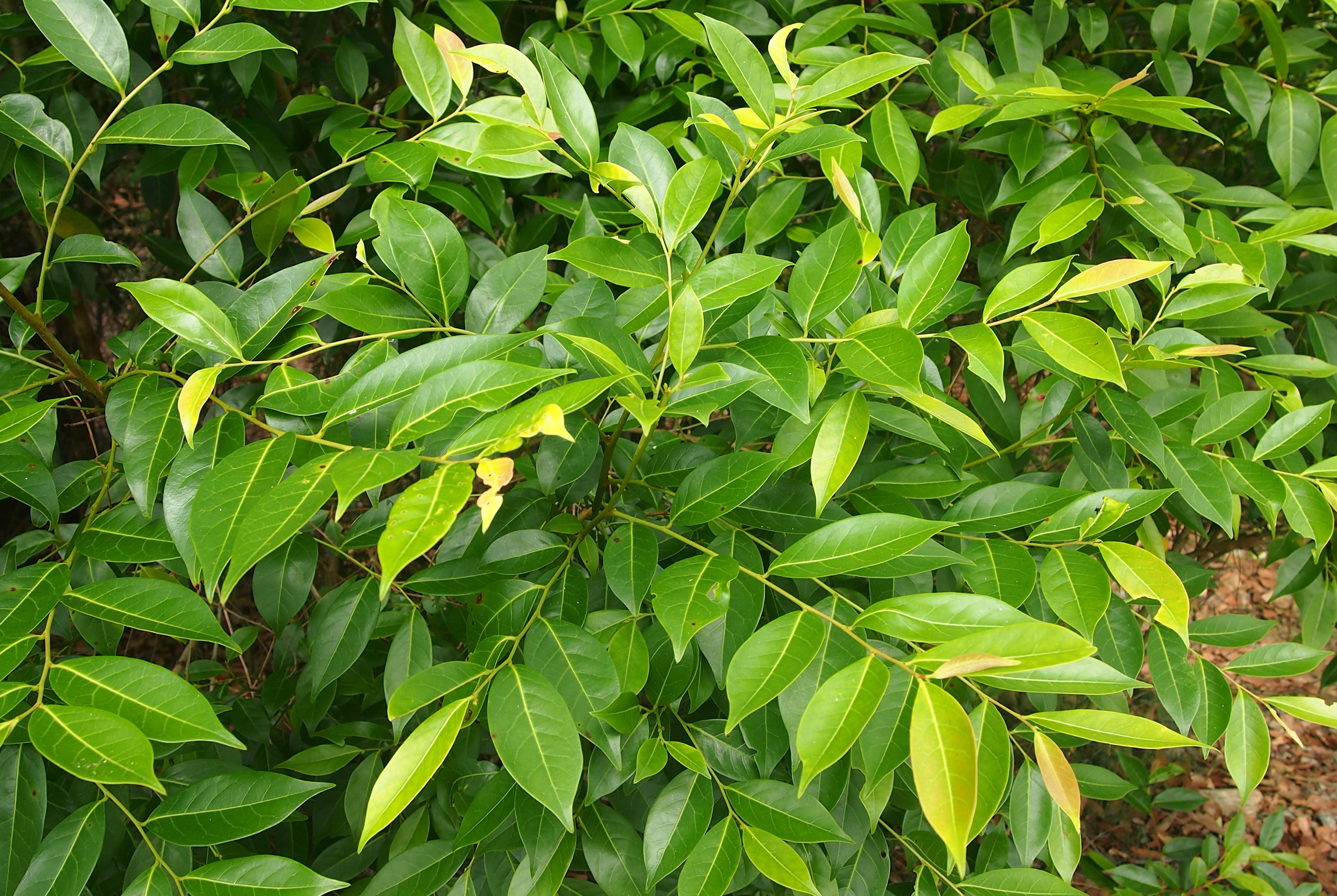
Phyllanthus ferdinandi foliage

It grows as a woody shrub or small tree to 8 metres (26 ft), although occasionally reaching 30 metres (98 ft), with flaky brownish-grey bark. It has simple alternate-arranged elliptical leaves 3–10 centimetres (1.2–3.9 in) in length and 1.5–4 centimetres (0.59–1.57 in) wide; the species may be partly deciduous in winter. Flowering may occur at any time of year; the cheese tree has both single female and male flowers, which are found in groups of three. Both sexes are green-yellow, with the male flowers about 0.7 cm and the female 0.5 cm in diameter. The most notable feature are the small pumpkin-shaped fruit, which are green at first before turning shades of white and pink. Divided into segments radially, they eventually split open to reveal bright red 0.5 cm seeds from November to April.

== Taxonomy and naming ==
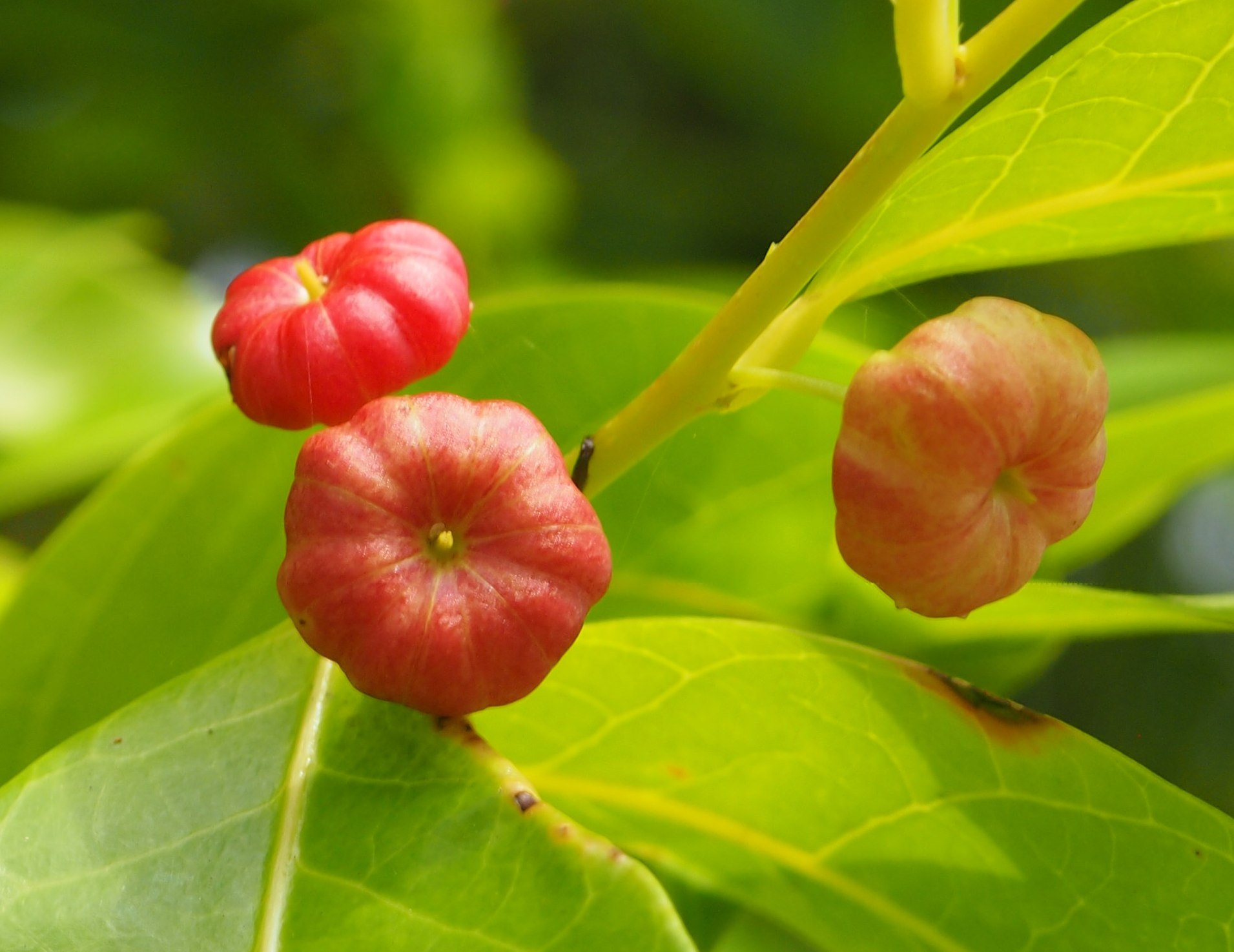
Phyllanthus ferdinandi fruit

The name "cheese tree" comes from its fruit's resemblance to small cheese wheels. Other common names include water gum, button wood, pencil cedar, and jow-war.

The species was originally described by Swiss botanist Johannes Müller Argoviensis in 1865. Its specific epithet honours Victorian State Botanist Ferdinand von Mueller. Note that the specific name is spelled with a single or double "i" by various sources.

An uncommon variety, pubens, known as the hairy cheese tree, is smaller, with leaves and fruit finely hairy.

== Distribution and habitat ==
The cheese tree grows in both clay and sandy soils, and is found in rainforest and wetter areas in sclerophyll forest, where it may be associated with such species as bangalay (Eucalyptus botryoides), woollybutt (E. longifolia), forest red gum (E. tereticornis) thin-leaved stringybark (E. eugenioides) and swamp she-oak (Casuarina glauca). The hairy cheese tree grows with magenta lilly pilly (Syzygium paniculatum), broad-leaved paperbark (Melaleuca quinquenervia), and Rhodomyrtus species.

It is found from central Queensland to the vicinity of Ulladulla (35° S) in southern New South Wales.

== Ecology ==
The fruits are eaten by several bird species, including the Australasian figbird (Sphecotheres vieilloti), Lewin's honeyeater, (Meliphaga lewinii), olive-backed oriole (Oriolus sagittatus), white-headed pigeon (Columba leucomela), topknot pigeon (Lopholaimus antarcticus), brown cuckoo-dove (Macropygia phasianella), and Australian king parrot (Alisterus scapularis). The pied currawong (Strepera graculina) also eats the fruit but regurgitates them, while new leafy growth is eaten by the rainbow lorikeet (Trichoglossus haematodus). It also serves as food for the larvae of the shining pencil-blue (Candalides helenita), and the shining- or common oak-blue (Arhopala micale).

The ladybird Scymnodes lividigaster feeds on the aphid Aphis eugeniae, which feeds on the cheese tree.

Phyllanthus ferdinandi presumably is dependent on leafflower moths (Epicephala spp.) for its pollination, like other species of tree in the genus Phyllanthus. Leafflower moths, including the species Epicephala colymbetella, have been collected from fruit of this species. Although leafflower moths actively pollinate Glochidion flowers, the adult moths also lay eggs inside the flowers, where their caterpillars later consume a subset of the developing seeds in the fruit. G. ferdinandi is unusual (although not unique) among species of Glochidion in that the fruit contain empty carpel chambers within which E. colymbetella caterpillars pupate, and adult moths emerge.

Phyllanthus ferdinandi is a long-lived species which may live for 60 years or more. It may sucker or resprout after bushfire. Seeds take 1–4 months to germinate.

== Cultivation ==
It is an easily grown pioneer species useful in bush regeneration and natural landscaping of areas to which it is native in eastern Australia. The species may colonise disturbed areas, and is a fast-growing plant. Plants require ample water but adapt to a wide range of soils and sun or shade. It can be grown as an indoor plant in a bright position.

== Toxicity ==
Two cases of dogs suffering from acute liver failure were published in 2019. Both dogs had been chewing on the roots of this species, however it is unclear whether the condition was caused by the tree roots themselves, a fungus that lives on the tree roots, or some other source.

== Uses ==
The dried fruits, which resemble miniature pumpkins, are sold as "putka pods" for use in potpourri.
