= Leaf flower =

Leaf flower or leafflower is the common name of plants in the genus Phyllanthus. It may also refer to other plants in the leaf-flower family, Phyllanthaceae.

Leaf-flower tree or leafflower tree most commonly refers to Phyllanthus lanceolarius, formerly Glochidion lanceolarium.

It may also refer to other trees in the genera:

- Glochidion, also known as cheese trees or buttonwood
- Phyllanthus

== See also ==
- Leafflower moths, insects in the genus Epicephala, which have a mutualistic relationship with the plants
