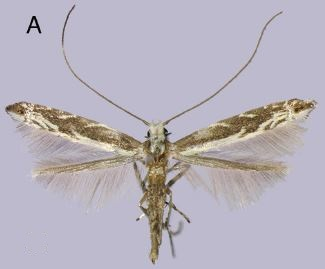

Scientific classification
- Kingdom: Animalia
- Phylum: Arthropoda
- Clade: Pancrustacea
- Class: Insecta
- Order: Lepidoptera
- Family: Gracillariidae
- Genus: Epicephala
- Species: E. anthophilia

Binomial name
- Epicephala anthophilia Kawakita A, Kato M, 2016

= Epicephala anthophilia =

Species of moth

Epicephala anthophilia is a moth of the family Gracillariidae. It is found on a few islands with high elevation in the Ryukyu Archipelago (Amami Island and Okinawa Island). The host plant, Glochidion acuminatum is distributed throughout Southeast Asia from southern Japan to India, so this species is likely to be found in other parts of the host plant's range.

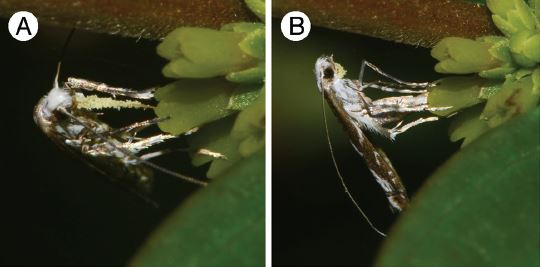
A: female actively depositing pollen on Glochidion acuminatum female flower; B: ovipositing through stylar pit of G. acuminatum flower

The wingspan is 9.2–11 mm. The forewings are brown with a narrow white band on the dorsum from the base to two-thirds of the entire length. There are three pairs of white bands beginning at the costal and dorsal margins near 1/2 to three-fourths length of the wing and extending obliquely toward the wing apex, terminating before reaching mid-width of the wing. There is a narrow silver band with metallic reflection extending from the costa to the dorsum at five-sixths length and the distal one-sixth is orange-brown with a black dot centrally, franked by a short white spot or band near the costa and dorsum. The distal end fringed with a narrow white band. The hindwings are brown.

The larvae feed on the seeds of Glochidion acuminatum.

== Etymology ==
The species name refers to the fact that flower-visiting behavior of Epicephala was first found in this species and is derived from Latin antho- (meaning flower) and -philia (meaning love, affection).
