= Conopomorpha flueggella =

Scientific classification
- Domain: Eukaryota
- Kingdom: Animalia
- Phylum: Arthropoda
- Class: Insecta
- Order: Lepidoptera
- Family: Gracillariidae
- Genus: Conopomorpha
- Species: C. flueggella

Binomial name
- Conopomorpha flueggella Li, 2011

Species of moth

Conopomorpha flueggella is a moth of the family Gracillariidae. It is known from Tianjin, China.

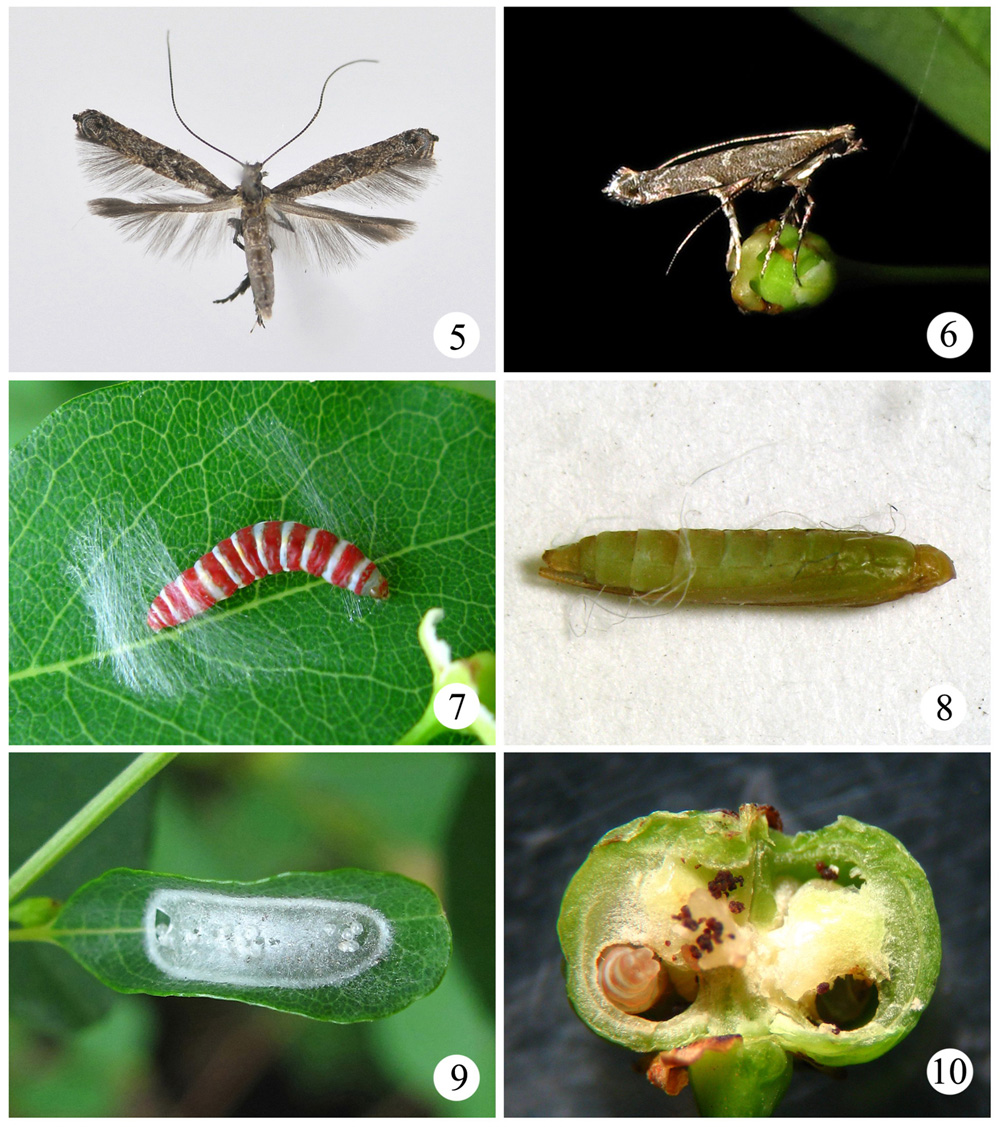
Life history of Conopomorpha flueggella. 5 adult, holotype, male 6 female moth resting on a female flower at night 7 mature larva weaving pupal cocoon on a host leaf 8 pupa 9 pupal cocoon on a host leaf 10 infested fruit

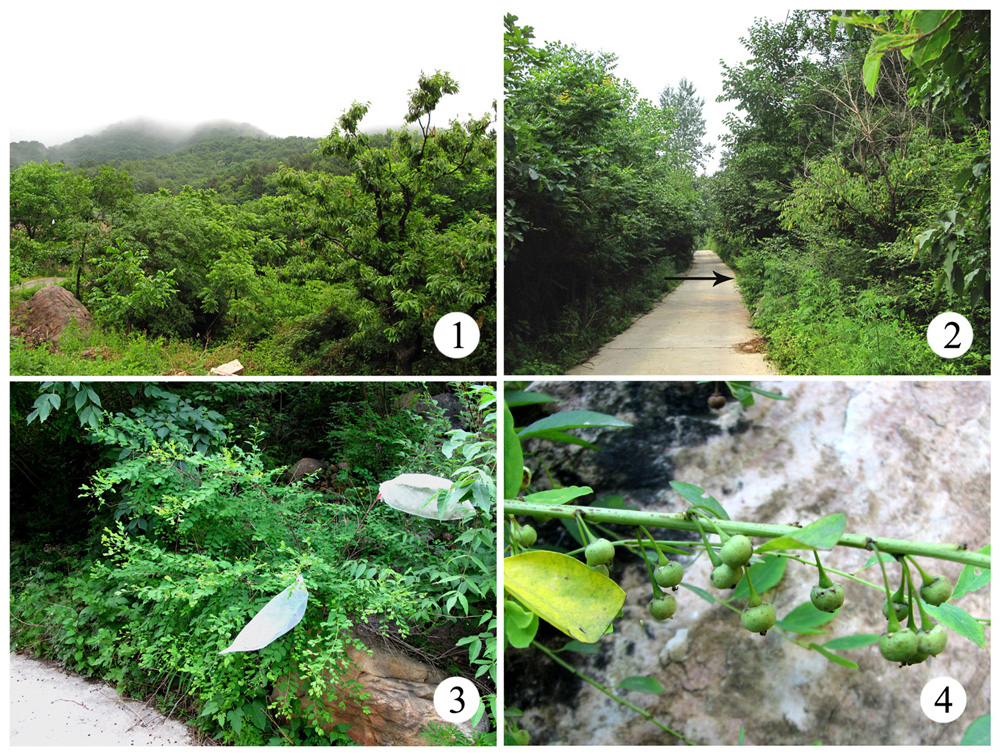
Habitats and host plants of Epicephala relictella and Conopomorpha flueggella in Baxian Mountain State Nature Reserves. 1 general habitat 2 habitat of Flueggea suffruticosa, arrow pointing to host plant 3 female individual of Flueggea suffruticosa 4 fruits of Flueggea suffruticosa

== Adult ==
The wingspan is 8-15.5 mm. The head is grey to greyish brown and the frons is greyish white. The thorax and tegula are dark brown. The forewing is narrow and the costal and dorsal margins are nearly parallel. The ground colour is greyish brown to dark brown. The hindwing and cilia are greyish brown and the abdomen is grey, although the first two segments are shining white. It is similar to Conopomorpha litchiella, but distinguishable by the uniformly greyish brown to dark brown forewing with three pairs of stripes and differences in the genitalia. Furthermore, in Conopomorpha litchiella, the forewing is whitish yellow in distal portion and the larva is yellowish green.

== Egg ==
The egg is flat, elliptic and about 0.3 mm in length and 0.2 mm in width. There is a transparent membrane in the surface and an irregular meshy stripe on the egg shell. It is milky white and semitransparent but turns straw yellow when close to hatching.

== Larva ==
Young instar larvae are flat, yellowish white, semitransparent and with distinct segments. Mature larvae are 5.5-7.0 mm. The head is deep brown and the anterior half to two-thirds of each segment on the thorax and abdomen is red, while the remainder is white.

== Pupa ==
The pupa is 4–6 mm, fusiform and greenish yellow in the early pupal stage, changing gradually to yellowish brown and eventually blackish brown before eclosion (emergence).

== Cocoon ==
The cocoon is 7–9 mm, white, flat elliptic, with some white grains attached on surface.

== Life history ==
There are two generations per year in Tianjin, China. Mature larvae quit the fruits of their food plant before they are ripe and pupate on leaves or leaf litter. The pupal stage lasts from nine to twelve days. Adults of the second generation hibernate. Adults occur from May to the first ten days of June, and from the last ten days of June to the first ten days of August. Adults can emerge during the whole day, but the peak occurs in the morning. The mating occurs usually in the morning. At night, the moths are actively drinking nectar and ovipositing. A parasitic Ichneumonid species was reared from pupae collected in the field.

== Food plant ==
The larvae feed on the seeds of Flueggea suffruticosa.
