= Epicephala lomatographa =

Scientific classification
- Domain: Eukaryota
- Kingdom: Animalia
- Phylum: Arthropoda
- Class: Insecta
- Order: Lepidoptera
- Family: Gracillariidae
- Genus: Epicephala
- Species: E. lomatographa

Binomial name
- Epicephala lomatographa Turner, 1913

Species of moth

Epicephala lomatographa is a moth of the family Gracillariidae. It is known from Queensland, Australia.
