= Epicephala venenata =

Scientific classification
- Domain: Eukaryota
- Kingdom: Animalia
- Phylum: Arthropoda
- Class: Insecta
- Order: Lepidoptera
- Family: Gracillariidae
- Genus: Epicephala
- Species: E. venenata

Binomial name
- Epicephala venenata Meyrick, 1935

Species of moth

Epicephala venenata is a moth of the family Gracillariidae. It is known from Taiwan.
