= Epicephala periplecta =

Scientific classification
- Domain: Eukaryota
- Kingdom: Animalia
- Phylum: Arthropoda
- Class: Insecta
- Order: Lepidoptera
- Family: Gracillariidae
- Genus: Epicephala
- Species: E. periplecta

Binomial name
- Epicephala periplecta (Diakonoff, 1955)

Species of moth

Epicephala periplecta is a moth of the family Gracillariidae. It is known from New Guinea.
