= Epicephala vermiformis =

Scientific classification
- Domain: Eukaryota
- Kingdom: Animalia
- Phylum: Arthropoda
- Class: Insecta
- Order: Lepidoptera
- Family: Gracillariidae
- Genus: Epicephala
- Species: E. vermiformis

Binomial name
- Epicephala vermiformis Meyrick, 1936

Species of moth

Epicephala vermiformis is a moth of the family Gracillariidae. It is known from Java, Indonesia.

The larvae feed on Cajanus cajan. They probably mine the leaves of their host plant.
