= Epicephala tephrostola =

Scientific classification
- Kingdom: Animalia
- Phylum: Arthropoda
- Class: Insecta
- Order: Lepidoptera
- Family: Gracillariidae
- Genus: Epicephala
- Species: E. tephrostola

Binomial name
- Epicephala tephrostola Vári, 1961

Species of moth

Epicephala tephrostola is a moth of the family Gracillariidae. It is known from South Africa.
