= Epicephala pelopepla =

Scientific classification
- Kingdom: Animalia
- Phylum: Arthropoda
- Class: Insecta
- Order: Lepidoptera
- Family: Gracillariidae
- Genus: Epicephala
- Species: E. pelopepla

Binomial name
- Epicephala pelopepla Vári, 1961

Species of moth

Epicephala pelopepla is a moth of the family Gracillariidae. It is known from South Africa.
