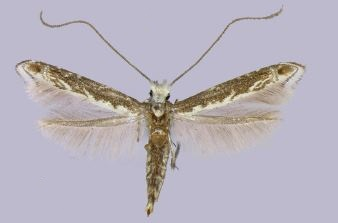

Scientific classification
- Domain: Eukaryota
- Kingdom: Animalia
- Phylum: Arthropoda
- Class: Insecta
- Order: Lepidoptera
- Family: Gracillariidae
- Genus: Epicephala
- Species: E. perplexa

Binomial name
- Epicephala perplexa Kawakita A, Kato M, 2016

= Epicephala perplexa =

Species of moth

Epicephala perplexa is a moth of the family Gracillariidae. It is found on the Ryukyu Archipelago (Amami Island, Okinawa Island, Ishigaki Island, Iriomote Island and Yonaguni Island).

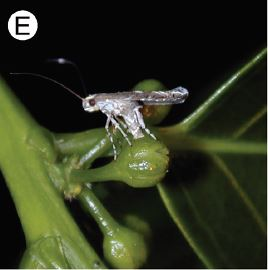
ovipositing through lateral ovary wall of G. lanceolatum flower

The wingspan is 8.3–10 mm. The forewings are brown with a narrow white band on the dorsum from the base to 2/3 of the entire length and with three narrow white bands beginning at the dorsal margin near 1/2 to 3/4 length of the wing and extending obliquely toward the wing apex, terminating before reaching mid-width of the wing. Dull white spots are scattered on the costal half and there is a narrow silver band with metallic reflection extending from the costa to the dorsum at 5/6 length. The distal 1/6 is orange-brown with a black dot centrally, franked by a short white band near the dorsum. The distal end is fringed with a narrow white band. The hindwings are brown.

The larvae feed on the seeds of Glochidion lanceolatum.

== Etymology ==
The species name refers to the fact that this species remained hidden until a detailed study on species specificity was performed and is derived from Latin perplexus (meaning cryptic).
