= Epicephala eugonia =

Scientific classification
- Kingdom: Animalia
- Phylum: Arthropoda
- Clade: Pancrustacea
- Class: Insecta
- Order: Lepidoptera
- Family: Gracillariidae
- Genus: Epicephala
- Species: E. eugonia

Binomial name
- Epicephala eugonia Turner, 1913

Species of moth

Epicephala eugonia is a moth of the family Gracillariidae. It is known from Queensland, Australia.
