= Epicephala squamella =

Scientific classification
- Kingdom: Animalia
- Phylum: Arthropoda
- Class: Insecta
- Order: Lepidoptera
- Family: Gracillariidae
- Genus: Epicephala
- Species: E. squamella

Binomial name
- Epicephala squamella Kuznetzov & Baryshnikova, 2001

Species of moth

Epicephala squamella is a moth of the family Gracillariidae. It is known from Vietnam.
