= Epicephala acrobaphes =

Scientific classification
- Domain: Eukaryota
- Kingdom: Animalia
- Phylum: Arthropoda
- Class: Insecta
- Order: Lepidoptera
- Family: Gracillariidae
- Genus: Epicephala
- Species: E. acrobaphes

Binomial name
- Epicephala acrobaphes (Turner, 1900)

Synonyms
- Ornix acrobaphes Turner, 1900

Species of moth

Epicephala acrobaphes is a moth of the family Gracillariidae. It is known from Queensland, Australia.
