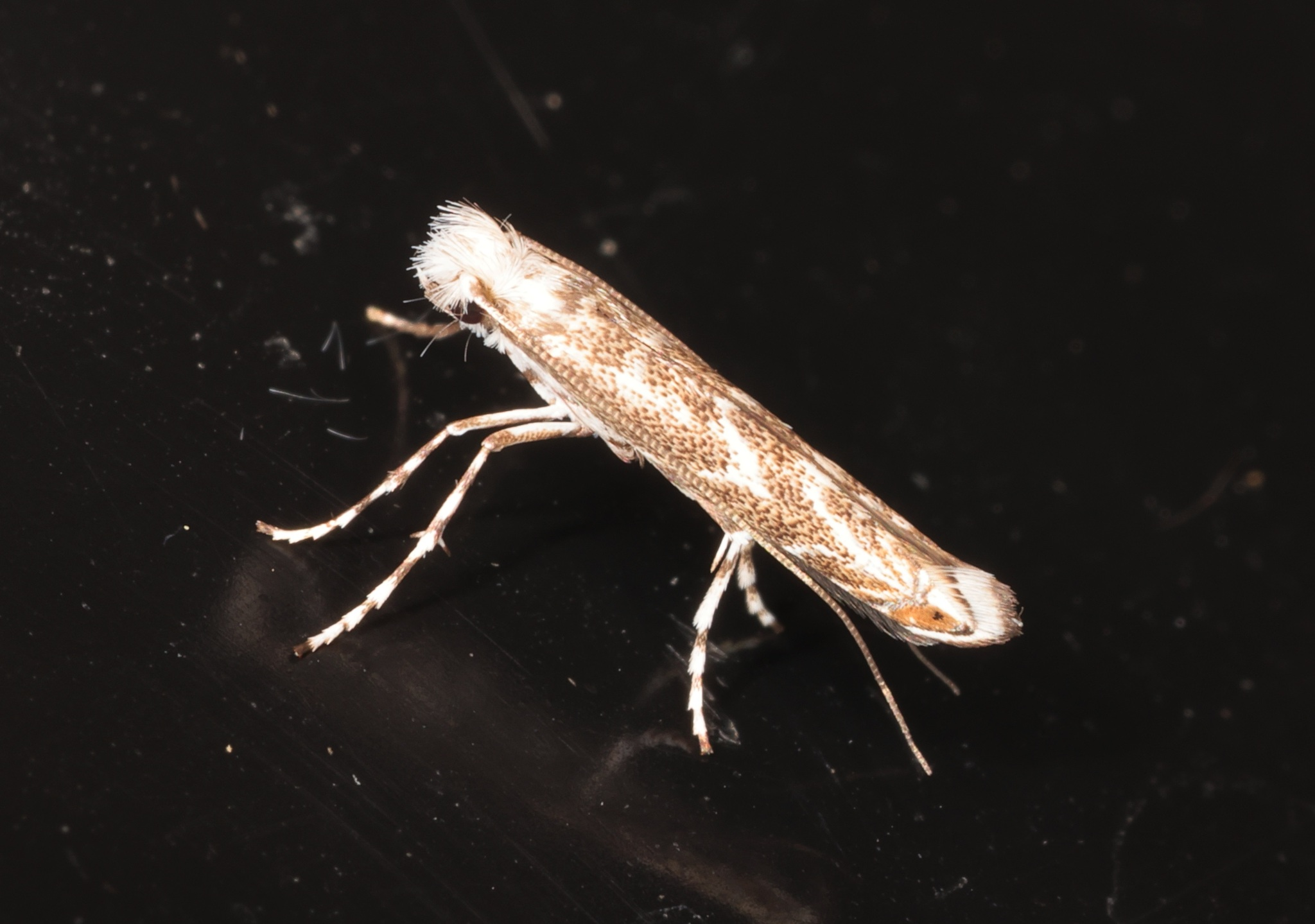

Scientific classification
- Kingdom: Animalia
- Phylum: Arthropoda
- Class: Insecta
- Order: Lepidoptera
- Family: Gracillariidae
- Genus: Epicephala
- Species: E. lanceolaria

Binomial name
- Epicephala lanceolaria Li, Wang & Zhang, 2012

= Epicephala lanceolaria =

Species of moth

Epicephala lanceolaria is a leafflower moth of the family Gracillariidae. The only known host of the larva is Glochidion lanceolarium which is pollinated by the imago (flying moth).

== Distribution ==
The moth is endemic to China and found in the provinces of Guangdong, Hainan and Hong Kong. It was described in 2012 from the type locality taken from the South China Botanical Garden.

== Biology ==
The eggs are laid in April and May on the flowers of Glochidion lanceolarium, with the adult moth pollinating the plant at the same time. G lanceolarium differs from other leafflower trees by producing their fruit in January and the larvae emerge from the eggs, at that time, to feed within the fruit. The larvae pupate within the mature fruit in March and the moths fly out in the following months to lay eggs on the newly emerged flowers.
