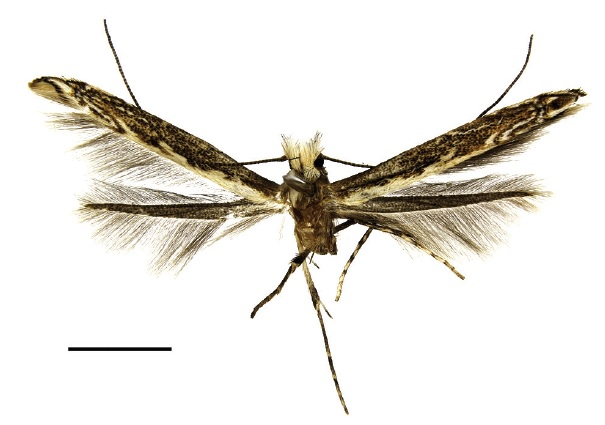

Scientific classification
- Domain: Eukaryota
- Kingdom: Animalia
- Phylum: Arthropoda
- Class: Insecta
- Order: Lepidoptera
- Family: Gracillariidae
- Genus: Epicephala
- Species: E. domina

Binomial name
- Epicephala domina Li, 2015

= Epicephala domina =

Species of moth

Epicephala domina is a moth of the family Gracillariidae. It is found in China (Hainan).

The length of the forewings is 7.5−11 mm. The forewings are greyish brown to deep brown with three pairs of white striae from both the costal and dorsal margins at two-fifths, three-fifths and four-fifths extending obliquely outward to the middle as well as to end and outside of the cell. The third dorsal striae is broader and more distinct. The dorsal margin has a broad white band extending from the base to the tornal area and there is a narrow silvery-white fascia with metallic reflection from the costal six-seventh to the dorsal margin. The distal one-seventh is yellowish brown, with a central black dot and with a triangular white dot near the costa and a white streak along the dorsal margin. The hindwings are greyish brown.

The larvae feed on seeds in the fruits of Glochidion sphaerogynum.

== Etymology ==
The species name refers to the status of the species as the dominant Epicephala species associated with G. sphaerogynum and is derived from Latin dominus (meaning master, lord).
