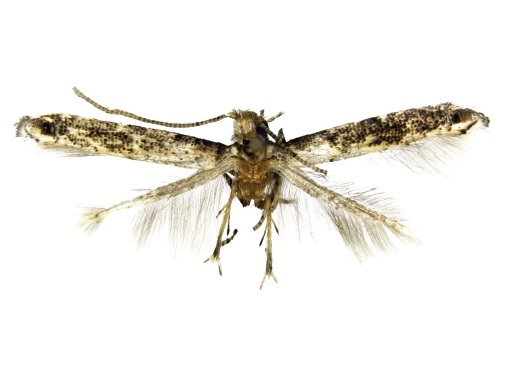

Scientific classification
- Domain: Eukaryota
- Kingdom: Animalia
- Phylum: Arthropoda
- Class: Insecta
- Order: Lepidoptera
- Family: Gracillariidae
- Genus: Epicephala
- Species: E. laeviclada

Binomial name
- Epicephala laeviclada H.-H. Li, 2015

= Epicephala laeviclada =

Species of moth

Epicephala laeviclada is a moth of the family Gracillariidae first described by Hou-Hun Li in 2015. It is found in the Chinese provinces of Guangxi and Hainan.

The length of the forewings is 5−7.5 mm. The forewings are brown to dark brown with three white striae from the costal 1/4, 1/3 and 2/5 extending obliquely outward to 1/3 the width of the forewing. The dorsum has a broad white band along the basal 1/3, serrated on the upper edge, distally with a stria extending obliquely outward to the middle of the cell, with a small triangular white spot and an obliquely outward stria at the middle and before 5/6. There is a narrow silvery-white fascia with metallic reflection from the costal 5/6 to the dorsum and the distal 1/6 is ochreous, with a central black spot edged by a white dot near the costa and a white band along the dorsum. The hindwings are greyish brown.

The larva feeds on seeds in the fruit of Phyllanthus microcarpus.

== Etymology ==
The species name refers to individuals of the host plant having glabrous branches and is derived from Latin laevis (meaning smooth) and cladus (meaning branch).
