= Epicephala scythropis =

Scientific classification
- Domain: Eukaryota
- Kingdom: Animalia
- Phylum: Arthropoda
- Class: Insecta
- Order: Lepidoptera
- Family: Gracillariidae
- Genus: Epicephala
- Species: E. scythropis

Binomial name
- Epicephala scythropis Meyrick, 1930

Species of moth

Epicephala scythropis is a moth of the family Gracillariidae. It is known from India and Myanmar.

The larvae feed on Phyllanthus species. They probably mine the leaves of their host plant.
