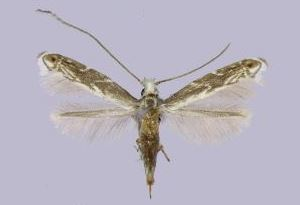

Scientific classification
- Domain: Eukaryota
- Kingdom: Animalia
- Phylum: Arthropoda
- Class: Insecta
- Order: Lepidoptera
- Family: Gracillariidae
- Genus: Epicephala
- Species: E. corruptrix

Binomial name
- Epicephala corruptrix Kawakita A, Kato M, 2016

= Epicephala corruptrix =

Species of moth

Epicephala corruptrix is a moth of the family Gracillariidae. It is found on the Ryukyu Archipelago (Amami Island, Tokuno Island, Okinawa Island, Ishigaki Island and Iriomote Island).

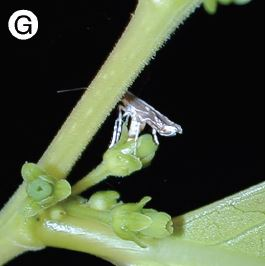
ovipositing through ovary wall of G. rubrum flower

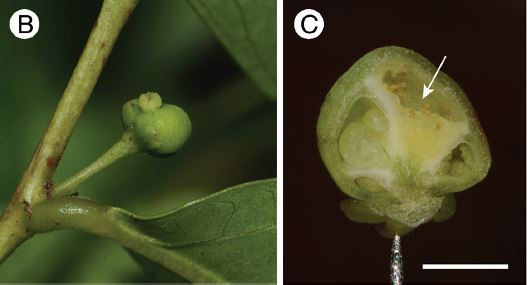
B: Gall induced on female flower by E. corruptrix (Takae, Okinawa); C: Cross section of the gall induced by E. corruptrix. Arrow indicates the galled locule with feeding trace of Epicephala larva

The wingspan is 7.2–8.8 mm. The forewings are brown with a narrow white band on the dorsum from the base to 2/3 of the entire length and with two pairs of narrow white bands beginning at the costal and dorsal margin near 1/2 to 3/4 length of the wing and extending obliquely toward the wing apex, terminating before reaching mid-width of the wing. The dorso-distal band is accompanied by another parallel band of same size on the distal position and there is a narrow silver band with metallic reflection extending from the costa to the dorsum at 5/6 length. The distal 1/6 is orange-brown with a black dot centrally, franked by short white band near the dorsum. The distal end is fringed with a narrow white band. The hindwings are brown.

The larvae feed on the seeds of Glochidion obovatum and Glochidion rubrum.

== Etymology ==
The species name is inherited from Tegeticula corruptrix, a derived parasitic species of yucca moth. Epicephala corruptrix has a potential to corrupt the mutualistic relationship with its host because the species induces gall formation in pollinated flowers which then hardly produce seeds.
