= Epicephala spinula =

Scientific classification
- Kingdom: Animalia
- Phylum: Arthropoda
- Clade: Pancrustacea
- Class: Insecta
- Order: Lepidoptera
- Family: Gracillariidae
- Genus: Epicephala
- Species: E. spinula

Binomial name
- Epicephala spinula J.F.G.Clarke, 1986

Species of moth

Epicephala spinula is a moth of the family Gracillariidae, one of the most primitive groups of ditrysian "micromoths". Within its family, it belongs to the subfamily Gracillariinae. Even though it was first scientifically studied in 1929, for many decades the specimens of this moth were mistaken for the related Australian species E. colymbetella, and their distinctness was only realized in 1986. It is found on the Marquesas Islands, where it occurs at least on Nuku Hiva, Ua Pou, and Fatu Hiva, and though little-known it is apparently not uncommon. The holotype specimen, a female, is USNM 100839.

== Description ==
E. spinula is a small moth, slightly larger than E. colymbetella (9–12 mm – almost 0.5 in – in wingspan) and resembling it in coloration and pattern. The head and thorax are white; the labial palps are generally also white, but shaded somewhat greyish on the outside, except for the base of the second segment. The antennae, the tegula and the upperside of the abdomen are reddish grey, the antennae becoming lighter towards the tip, while the underside of the abdomen is white with reddish stripes; the males' abdomen has two pairs of coremata. The legs are white, with a blackish-brown suffusion in the outer side of the forelegs, and reddish spots on the mid- and hindleg tibiae, in the former there are three such marks, while on the hindlegs there is only one, near the tip of the tibia.

The forewing color is mainly reddish brown. The leading edge bears an oblique white dash just inside of the center. Just outside the leading edge center, a similar but tapering and somewhat curved mark runs almost parallel to the first (unlike in E. colymbetella, where the two white marks meet at the wing center). The trailing edge is white, interrupted by three thin streaks of reddish-brown which run a short distance into the wing. The wingtip is most prominently marked; it is delimited by a blackish area of the leading and outer wing edge, connected by a metallic stripe which separates the forewing tip proper from the rest of the wing. The wingtip is white, with an ochre spot in the middle; at the inner edge of this spot, there is a small black dot. The hairy fringe of the forewings is grey along the trailing edge and white on the outer edge and wingtip; in the latter area, the hairs are tipped reddish grey. The hindwings are uniformly grey with a slight brassy iridescence; they, too, have a hairy fringe, which is grey all over in this case.

In the male genitals of E. spinula, the clasper's harpe is divided, with a slender costal part that is covered in bristles. Particularly notable are a group of stout setae in the center of the outer side, and a large protuberance at the base on which there is a single long bristle. The sacculus is a broad curved plate with another prominent and strong bristle near the tip. The vinculum is broad, with a saccus of average size; the tegumen is elongated and triangular. The anellus is barely sclerotized, and has a small and finely bristled lobe on each side near the hind end. The aedeagus is long, slender, and seems to lack cornuti. In the female genitals, the ostium forms a broad funnel, with a large sclerotized and rough plate towards the hind end on each side. The antrum is a narrow and sclerotized ring. The ductus seminalis attaches at the side, from the hind end of the long, broad ductus bursae, whose surface is mostly roughened. The bursa copulatrix is not sclerotized and very small, with the signum a grainy band that runs around the bursa at midway.

== Ecology ==
This species is little-known ecologically. The holotype was collected on March 22, 1968, on Mount Teoaiua, Fatu Hiva, at an elevation of about 600 m (2000 ft) ASL (about 10°30′19″S 138°38′36″W), but the first specimen (the male misidentified as E. colymbetella, BMNH 1925-488) was collected already on January 15, 1925, by the St. George Expedition. The species is apparently widespread at least in the southern part of Fatu Hiva, but has been found on Nuku Hiva as well, and probably occurs from near sea level to elevations of at least about 750 m (2500 ft) ASL on these islands (and perhaps others). This species is the seed predator and presumably pollinator of the Marquesan endemic tree Glochidion marchionicum (syn. Phyllanthus marchionicus), since it has been reared from G. marchionicum fruit on Nuku Hiva, Ua Pou, and Fatu Hiva, and specimens collected by Clarke and held in the Smithsonian Institution bear pollen on the proboscis, in the same manner as other Pacific Island and Asian Epicephala which pollinate other species of Glochidion (Phyllanthus sensu lato). E. spinula may also pollinate and consume seeds of the Marquesan endemic tree Glochidion hivaoaense (syn. Phyllanthus hivaoaensis) on the islands of Hiva Oa and Tahuata.
