= Epicephala subtilis =

Scientific classification
- Domain: Eukaryota
- Kingdom: Animalia
- Phylum: Arthropoda
- Class: Insecta
- Order: Lepidoptera
- Family: Gracillariidae
- Genus: Epicephala
- Species: E. subtilis

Binomial name
- Epicephala subtilis Meyrick, 1922

Species of moth

Epicephala subtilis is a moth of the family Gracillariidae. It is known from Tamil Nadu, India.
