= Epicephala relictella =

Scientific classification
- Domain: Eukaryota
- Kingdom: Animalia
- Phylum: Arthropoda
- Class: Insecta
- Order: Lepidoptera
- Family: Gracillariidae
- Genus: Epicephala
- Species: E. relictella

Binomial name
- Epicephala relictella Kuznetzov, 1979

Species of moth

Epicephala relictella is a moth of the family Gracillariidae. It is known from the Russian Far East, China (Tianjin, Hebei, Heilongjiang, Gansu) and Korea.

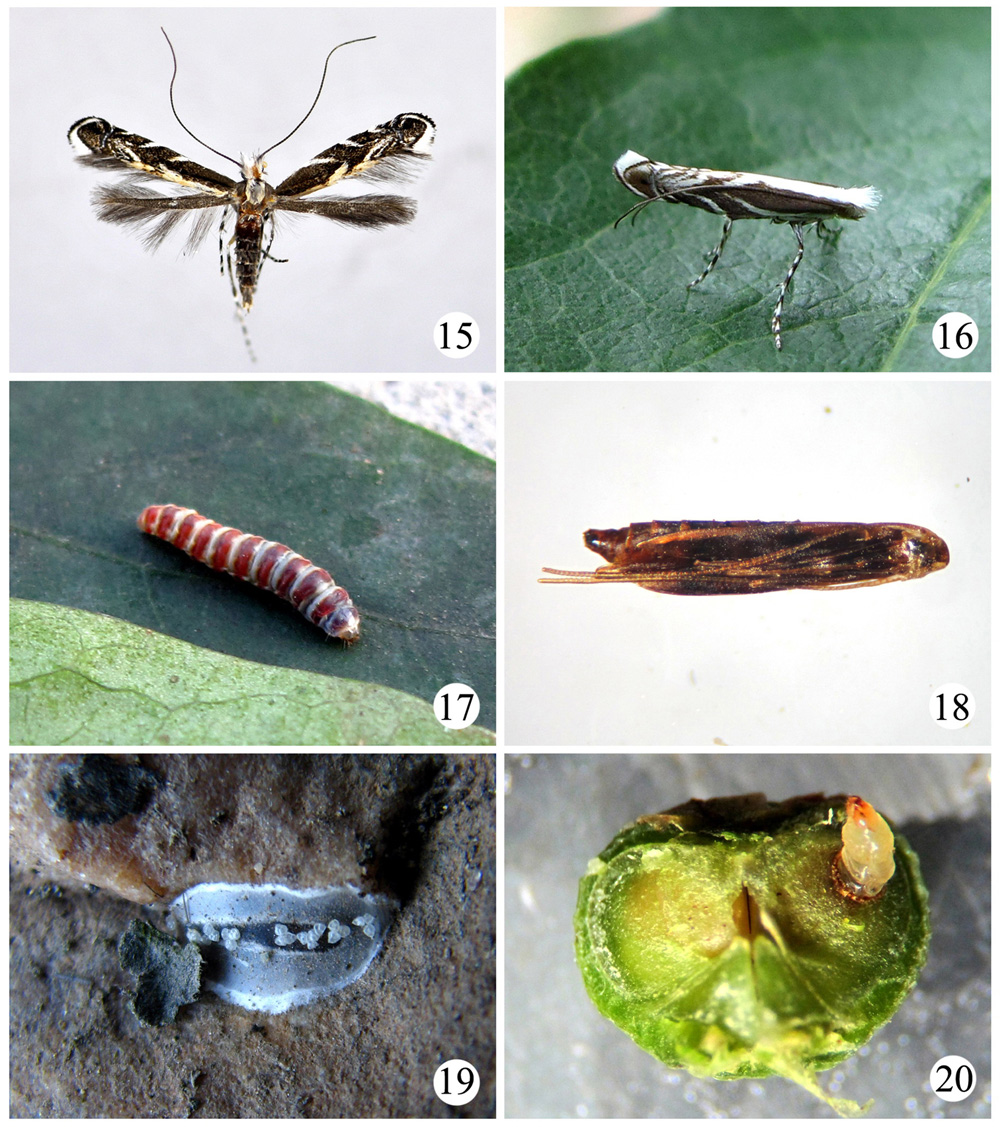
Life history of Epicephala relictella. 15 adult 16 moth resting on a leaf of host 17 mature larva resting on host leaf 18 pupa 19 pupal cocoon on stone nearby host 20 infested fruit.

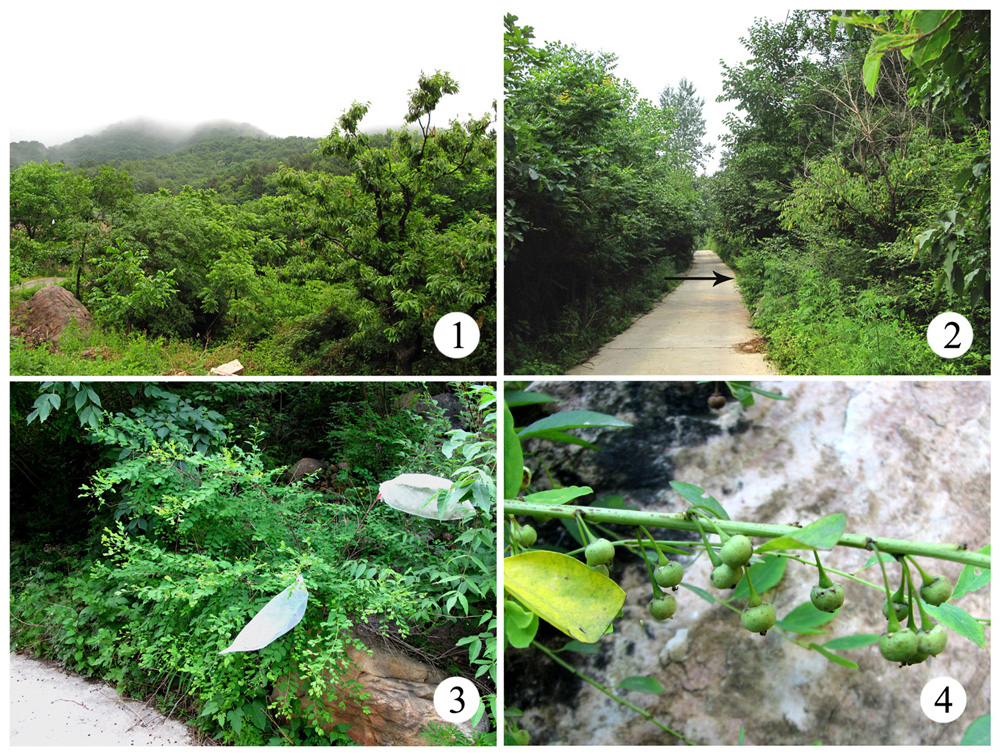
Habitats and host plants of Epicephala relictella and Conopomorpha flueggella in Baxian Mountain State Nature Reserves. 1 general habitat 2 habitat of Flueggea suffruticosa, arrow pointing to host plant 3 female individual of Flueggea suffruticosa 4 fruits of Flueggea suffruticosa.

== Adult ==
The wingspan is 9–13 mm. The head is white and tufted. The tegula and forewing are greyish brown with white stripes and a large black spot near the apex. The dorsal margin is white tinged with ocherous yellow, longitudinally forming a broad band. The abdomen is greying brown on the dorsal surface except for the first two segments which are grey.

== Egg ==
The egg is oval and has a diameter of about 0.15–0.20 mm. The surface is smooth and shiny. At first, it is yellowish white and nearly transparent, then becoming straw yellow before hatching.

== Larva ==
Young instar larvae are very similar to that of Conopomorpha flueggella. Mature larvae are 5–6.5 mm. The head capsule is brownish yellow and the median two-thirds of each segment on the thorax and abdomen is dark red while the anterior and posterior ends are white. The thoracic segments are slightly blue and there are blue spots on the abdominal segments. There are sparse white setae on the body.

== Pupa ==
The pupa is 4–5.5 mm and fusiform. It is greenish yellow in the early pupal stage, changing gradually to dark brown.

== Cocoon ==
The cocoon is 6–8 mm, white, flat elliptic, with some white grains attached on the surface.

== Food plant ==
The larvae have been recorded feeding on the seeds of Flueggea suffruticosa.

== Life history ==
There is one generation per year in Tianjin, China. The larval stage is completed within one fruit. When completing larval development, the mature larvae quit the fruits and pupate on the leaves, and overwinter under leaf litter or stones. Adults appear from June to July. They can emerge during the whole day, but the peak occurs in the morning. The moths are most active at night, drinking nectar and ovipositing. During the daytime they rest on leaves or branches. Adult longevity is three to ten days, but adults generally live for five to seven days. Adults hardly come to light.
