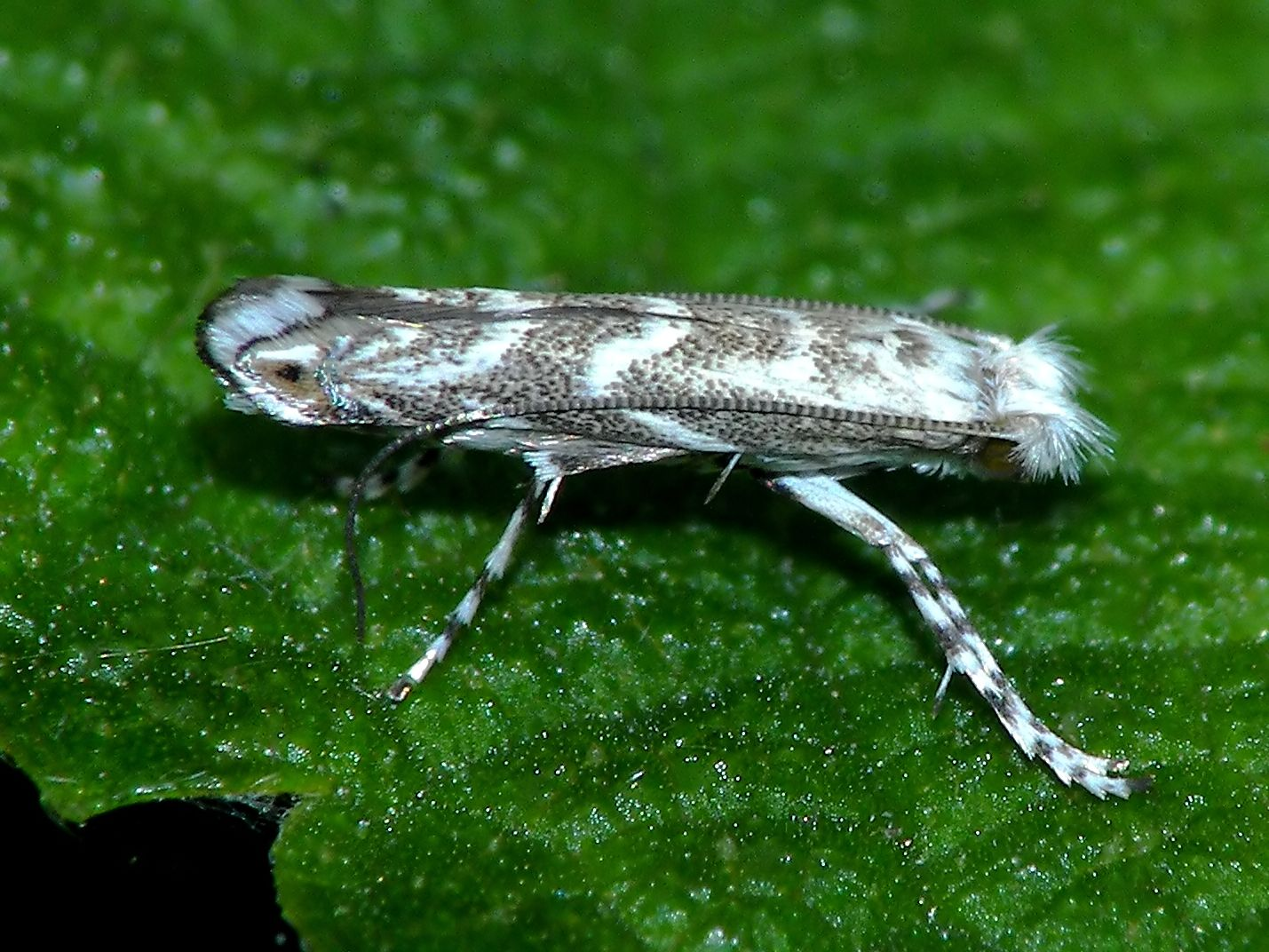

Scientific classification
- Kingdom: Animalia
- Phylum: Arthropoda
- Clade: Pancrustacea
- Class: Insecta
- Order: Lepidoptera
- Family: Gracillariidae
- Genus: Epicephala
- Species: E. albifrons

Binomial name
- Epicephala albifrons (Stainton, 1859)

= Epicephala albifrons =

Species of moth

Epicephala albifrons is a moth of the family Gracillariidae. It is known from India (Karnataka, West Bengal and Kerala), Indonesia (Buru), Sri Lanka, Thailand and Vietnam.

The larvae feed on Phyllanthus species, including Phyllanthus niruri. They probably mine the leaves of their host plant.
