= Epicephala eriocarpa =

Scientific classification
- Domain: Eukaryota
- Kingdom: Animalia
- Phylum: Arthropoda
- Class: Insecta
- Order: Lepidoptera
- Family: Gracillariidae
- Genus: Epicephala
- Species: E. eriocarpa

Binomial name
- Epicephala eriocarpa Li, Wang & Zhang, 2012

Species of moth

Epicephala eriocarpa is a moth of the family Gracillariidae. It is found in Fujian, China.

The larvae feed on Glochidion eriocarpum.
