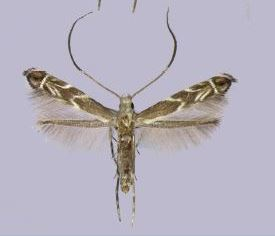

Scientific classification
- Domain: Eukaryota
- Kingdom: Animalia
- Phylum: Arthropoda
- Class: Insecta
- Order: Lepidoptera
- Family: Gracillariidae
- Genus: Epicephala
- Species: E. nudilingua

Binomial name
- Epicephala nudilingua Kawakita A, Kato M, 2016

= Epicephala nudilingua =

Species of moth

Epicephala nudilingua is a moth of the family Gracillariidae. It is known from three populations in Tochigi, Tokyo and Oita Prefecture, Japan. The host plant is widespread in the temperate regions of Japan and other parts of East Asia, so the species is likely to be found elsewhere.

The wingspan is 7–8.3 mm. The forewings are dark brown with a narrow white band on the dorsum from the base to 1/3 of the entire length and with three pairs of narrow white bands beginning at the costal and dorsal margin near 1/2 to 3/4 length of the wing and extending obliquely toward the wing apex, terminating before reaching mid-width of the wing. There is a narrow silver band with metallic reflection extending from the costa to the dorsum at 5/6 length and the distal 1/6 is brown with a black dot centrally, franked by a narrow white band near the dorsum. The distal end is fringed with a narrow white band and terminating with a narrow dark brown band. The hindwings are dark brown.

The larvae feed on the seeds of Phyllanthus ussuriensis.

== Etymology ==
The species name refers to the hairless proboscis of the female and is derived from Latin nudus (meaning naked) and lingua (meaning tongue).
