= Epicephala orientale =

Scientific classification
- Kingdom: Animalia
- Phylum: Arthropoda
- Clade: Pancrustacea
- Class: Insecta
- Order: Lepidoptera
- Family: Gracillariidae
- Genus: Epicephala
- Species: E. orientale

Binomial name
- Epicephala orientale (Stainton, 1856)

Synonyms
- Epicephala austeropa (Meyrick, 1914); Epicephala orientalis (Meyrick, 1908)

Species of moth

Epicephala orientale is a moth of the family Gracillariidae. It is known from India (West Bengal, Karnataka, Meghalaya).

The larvae feed on Bauhinia species, including Bauhinia purpurea and Bauhinia variegata. They probably mine the leaves of their host plant.
