= Epicephala calasiris =

Scientific classification
- Domain: Eukaryota
- Kingdom: Animalia
- Phylum: Arthropoda
- Class: Insecta
- Order: Lepidoptera
- Family: Gracillariidae
- Genus: Epicephala
- Species: E. calasiris

Binomial name
- Epicephala calasiris Meyrick, 1908

Species of moth

Epicephala calasiris is a moth of the family Gracillariidae. It is known from Meghalaya, India.
