= Epicephala australis =

Scientific classification
- Domain: Eukaryota
- Kingdom: Animalia
- Phylum: Arthropoda
- Class: Insecta
- Order: Lepidoptera
- Family: Gracillariidae
- Genus: Epicephala
- Species: E. australis

Binomial name
- Epicephala australis (Turner, 1896)

Synonyms
- Ornix australis Turner, 1896

Species of moth

Epicephala australis is a moth of the family Gracillariidae. It is known from Queensland, Australia.

The larvae feed on Acacia longifolia. They probably mine the leaves of their host plant.
