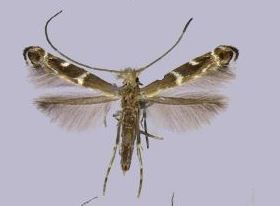

Scientific classification
- Domain: Eukaryota
- Kingdom: Animalia
- Phylum: Arthropoda
- Class: Insecta
- Order: Lepidoptera
- Family: Gracillariidae
- Genus: Epicephala
- Species: E. anthophilia

Binomial name
- Epicephala anthophilia Kawakita A, Kato M, 2016

= Epicephala parasitica =

Species of moth

Epicephala anthophilia is a moth of the family Gracillariidae. It is found on the Ryukyu Archipelago.

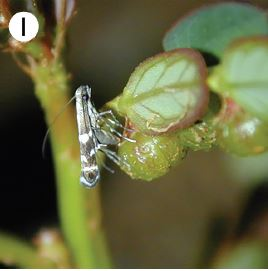
Ovipositing in young fruit of Phyllanthus lepidocarpus

The wingspan is 5.7–7.5 mm. The forewings of the females are dark brown with a narrow white band on the dorsum from the base to 1/4 of the entire length, medially with a narrow white band extending from the costa to the dorsum and with a pair of narrow white bands beginning at the costal and dorsal margin near 2/3 of the wing and extending obliquely toward the wing apex, terminating before reaching mid-width of the wing. There is a narrow silver band with metallic reflection extending from the costa to the dorsum at 5/6 length and the distal 1/6 is brown with a black dot centrally. The distal end is fringed with a narrow white band and terminating with a narrow black band. The hindwings of the females are dark brown. The forewings of the males are brown with a narrow white band on the dorsum from the base to 2/3 of the entire length and with three pairs of narrow white bands beginning at the costal and dorsal margin near 1/2 to 3/4 length of the wing and extending obliquely toward the wing apex, terminating before reaching mid-width of the wing. There is a narrow silver band with metallic reflection extending from the costa to the dorsum at 5/6 length and the distal 1/6 is orange-brown with a black dot centrally, franked by a short white band near the dorsum. The distal end is fringed with a narrow white band and terminating with a narrow brown band. The hindwings of the males are brown.

The larvae feed on the seeds of Phyllanthus lepidocarpus.

== Etymology ==
The species name refers to the parasitic nature of the species and is derived from Latin parasiticus (meaning parasitic).
