= Epicephala jansei =

Scientific classification
- Kingdom: Animalia
- Phylum: Arthropoda
- Class: Insecta
- Order: Lepidoptera
- Family: Gracillariidae
- Genus: Epicephala
- Species: E. jansei

Binomial name
- Epicephala jansei Vári, 1961

Species of moth

Epicephala jansei is a moth of the family Gracillariidae. It is known from Zimbabwe.
