= Epicephala bromias =

Scientific classification
- Domain: Eukaryota
- Kingdom: Animalia
- Phylum: Arthropoda
- Class: Insecta
- Order: Lepidoptera
- Family: Gracillariidae
- Genus: Epicephala
- Species: E. bromias

Binomial name
- Epicephala bromias Meyrick, 1910

Species of moth

Epicephala bromias is a moth of the family Gracillariidae. It is known from West Bengal, India.
