= Epicephala haplodoxa =

Scientific classification
- Kingdom: Animalia
- Phylum: Arthropoda
- Class: Insecta
- Order: Lepidoptera
- Family: Gracillariidae
- Genus: Epicephala
- Species: E. haplodoxa

Binomial name
- Epicephala haplodoxa Vári, 1961

Species of moth

Epicephala haplodoxa is a moth of the family Gracillariidae. It is known from South Africa and Mozambique.
