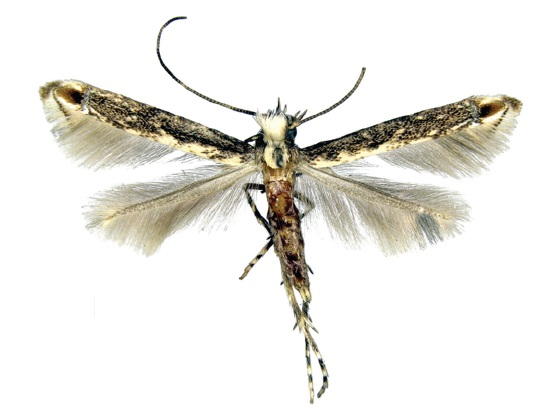

Scientific classification
- Domain: Eukaryota
- Kingdom: Animalia
- Phylum: Arthropoda
- Class: Insecta
- Order: Lepidoptera
- Family: Gracillariidae
- Genus: Epicephala
- Species: E. tertiaria

Binomial name
- Epicephala tertiaria H.-H. Li, 2015

= Epicephala tertiaria =

Species of moth

Epicephala tertiaria is a moth of the family Gracillariidae first described by Hou-Hun Li in 2015. It is found in the Chinese provinces of Guangdong and Guangxi.

The length of the forewings is 6−8.5 mm. The wings are brown to dark brown, the forewings with three pairs of white striae from both the costal and dorsal 1/4, 2/3 and 3/4 extending obliquely outward to the middle and end of the cell as well as outside of the cell respectively. The costal striae is narrow, inconsecutive and usually indistinct, while the dorsal striae is broad and clear, the latter two striae inconsecutive. The dorsum has a broad white band along the basal 1/3, a narrow silvery-white fascia bearing a bluish metallic reflection from the costal 5/6 to the dorsum, arched outward medially. The distal 1/6 is ochreous, with a central black dot near the fascia at 5/6, with a broad white band along the costa and dorsum. The hindwings are pale grey.

The larva feeds on seeds in the fruit of Phyllanthus microcarpus.

== Etymology ==
The species name refers to the fact that this is the third species reared from the host plant Phyllanthus microcarpus and is derived from Latin tertiarius (meaning third).
