= Epicephala sphenitis =

Scientific classification
- Domain: Eukaryota
- Kingdom: Animalia
- Phylum: Arthropoda
- Class: Insecta
- Order: Lepidoptera
- Family: Gracillariidae
- Genus: Epicephala
- Species: E. sphenitis

Binomial name
- Epicephala sphenitis Meyrick, 1931

Species of moth

Epicephala sphenitis is a moth of the family Gracillariidae. It is known from Bihar, India.

The larvae feed on Breynia rhamnoides and Breynia vitis-idaea. They probably mine the leaves of their host plant.
