= Epicephala homostola =

Scientific classification
- Kingdom: Animalia
- Phylum: Arthropoda
- Class: Insecta
- Order: Lepidoptera
- Family: Gracillariidae
- Genus: Epicephala
- Species: E. homostola

Binomial name
- Epicephala homostola Vári, 1961

Species of moth

Epicephala homostola is a moth of the family Gracillariidae. It is known from South Africa and Namibia.
