= Epicephala ancistropis =

Scientific classification
- Domain: Eukaryota
- Kingdom: Animalia
- Phylum: Arthropoda
- Class: Insecta
- Order: Lepidoptera
- Family: Gracillariidae
- Genus: Epicephala
- Species: E. ancistropis

Binomial name
- Epicephala ancistropis Meyrick, 1935

Species of moth

Epicephala ancistropis is a moth of the family Gracillariidae. It is known from Java, Indonesia.

The larvae feed on Callicarpa candicans. They probably mine the leaves of their host plant.
