= Epicephala mirivalvata =

Scientific classification
- Kingdom: Animalia
- Phylum: Arthropoda
- Clade: Pancrustacea
- Class: Insecta
- Order: Lepidoptera
- Family: Gracillariidae
- Genus: Epicephala
- Species: E. mirivalvata

Binomial name
- Epicephala mirivalvata Li, Wang & Zhang, 2012

Species of moth

Epicephala mirivalvata is a moth of the family Gracillariidae. It is found in Fujian and Hainan, China.

The larvae feed on Breynia fruticosa and Breynia rostrata.
