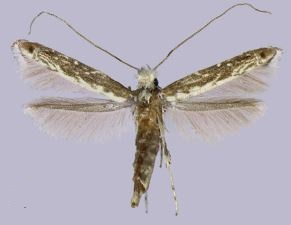

Scientific classification
- Domain: Eukaryota
- Kingdom: Animalia
- Phylum: Arthropoda
- Class: Insecta
- Order: Lepidoptera
- Family: Gracillariidae
- Genus: Epicephala
- Species: E. lanceolatella

Binomial name
- Epicephala lanceolatella Kawakita A, Kato M, 2016

= Epicephala lanceolatella =

Species of moth

Epicephala lanceolatella is a moth of the family Gracillariidae. It is found on the Ryukyu Archipelago (Amami Island, Okinawa Island, Ishigaki Island, Iriomote Island and Yonaguni Island).

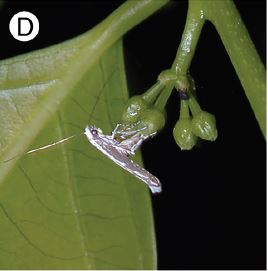
ovipositing through stylar pit of G. lanceolatum flower

The wingspan is 8.8–10.3 mm. The forewings are brown with a narrow white band on the dorsum from the base to 2/3 of the entire length and three narrow white bands beginning at the dorsal margin near 1/2 to 3/4 length of the wing and extending obliquely toward the wing apex, terminating before reaching mid-width of the wing. There are white spots scattered on the costal half and a narrow silver band with metallic reflection extending from the costa to the dorsum at 5/6 length. The distal 1/6 is orange-brown with a black dot centrally, flanked by a short white band near the dorsum. The distal end fringed has a narrow white band. The hindwings are brown.

The larvae feed on the seeds of Glochidion lanceolatum.

== Etymology ==
The species name refers to the name of the host plant.
