= Epicephala strepsiploca =

Scientific classification
- Domain: Eukaryota
- Kingdom: Animalia
- Phylum: Arthropoda
- Class: Insecta
- Order: Lepidoptera
- Family: Gracillariidae
- Genus: Epicephala
- Species: E. strepsiploca

Binomial name
- Epicephala strepsiploca Meyrick, 1918

Species of moth

Epicephala strepsiploca is a moth of the family Gracillariidae. It is known from Karnataka and Maharashtra, India.
