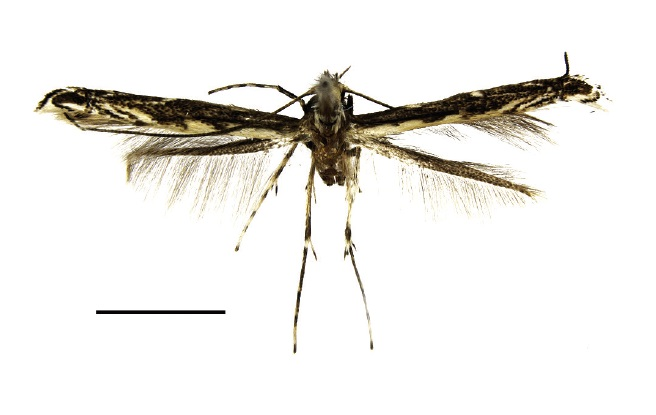

Scientific classification
- Domain: Eukaryota
- Kingdom: Animalia
- Phylum: Arthropoda
- Class: Insecta
- Order: Lepidoptera
- Family: Gracillariidae
- Genus: Epicephala
- Species: E. angustisaccula

Binomial name
- Epicephala angustisaccula Li, 2015

= Epicephala angustisaccula =

Species of moth

Epicephala angustisaccula is a moth of the family Gracillariidae. It is found in China (Hainan).

The length of the forewings is 7−8.5 mm. The forewings are greyish brown to deep brown and the costal margin has three parallel white striae obliquely extending outward from the basal one-third, halfway and three-fourths respectively, the first and third striae broad and short, reaching one-thirds of the wing width, the second stria narrow and long, reaching midwing. There is a broad creamy white band extending from the base to the tornus along the dorsal margin, its upper margin extended to a broad, ill-defined white stria at two-fifths, reaching below the fold dorsally, the second white stria from two-thirds obliquely outward to meet the second costal stria at midwing, the third stria from beyond the second one and parallel with it to the midwing, sometimes meeting the third costal stria. There is a silvery fascia with metallic reflection from the costal five-sixths to the dorsal margin, slightly arched outward medially. The distal one-sixth is yellowish brown, with a central black dot, with a small white dot at the costa and a white streak along the dorsal margin. The hindwings are grey to deep grey, sometimes with the basal one-third densely covered with rough black scales.

The larvae feed on seeds in the fruits of Glochidion sphaerogynum and Glochidion wrightii.

== Etymology ==
The species name refers to the distally narrowed sacculus in the male genitalia and is derived from Latin angustus (meaning narrow) and sacculus.
