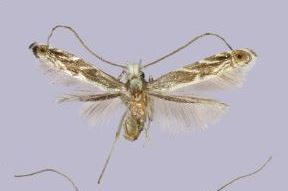

Scientific classification
- Domain: Eukaryota
- Kingdom: Animalia
- Phylum: Arthropoda
- Class: Insecta
- Order: Lepidoptera
- Family: Gracillariidae
- Genus: Epicephala
- Species: E. obovatella

Binomial name
- Epicephala obovatella Kawakita A, Kato M, 2016

= Epicephala obovatella =

Species of moth

Epicephala obovatella is a moth of the family Gracillariidae. It is found in the warm temperate to subtropical regions of Japan and in Taiwan.

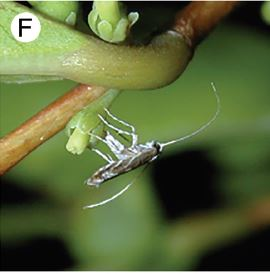
ovipositing through lateral ovary wall of G. obovatum flower

The wingspan is 7.5–11 mm. The forewings are brown with a narrow white band on the dorsum from the base to 2/3 of the entire length. There are three pairs of narrow white bands beginning at the costal and dorsal margin near 1/2 to 3/4 length of the wing and extending obliquely toward the wing apex, terminating before reaching mid-width of the wing. There is a narrow silver band with metallic reflection extending from the costa to the dorsum at 5/6 length and the distal 1/6 is orange-brown with a black dot centrally, franked by a short white band near the dorsum. The distal end is fringed with a narrow white band. The hindwings are brown.

The larvae feed on the seeds of Glochidion obovatum and Glochidion rubrum.

== Etymology ==
The species name refers to the species name of the primary host plant.
