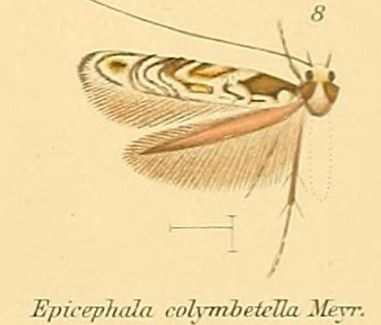

Scientific classification
- Domain: Eukaryota
- Kingdom: Animalia
- Phylum: Arthropoda
- Class: Insecta
- Order: Lepidoptera
- Family: Gracillariidae
- Genus: Epicephala
- Species: E. colymbetella

Binomial name
- Epicephala colymbetella Turner, 1947

Synonyms
- Epicephala frugicola Turner, 1913

= Epicephala colymbetella =

Species of moth

Epicephala colymbetella is a moth of the family Gracillariidae. It is known from the states of New South Wales and Queensland in Australia.

The larvae feed on Glochidion ferdinandi. They feed in the seed capsules.

The related E. spinula of the Marquesas Islands (French Polynesia) was for several decades erroneously included in the present species.
