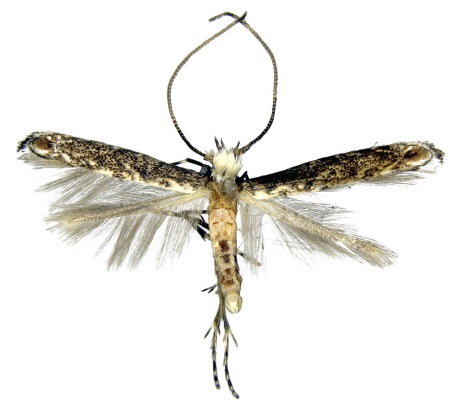

Scientific classification
- Domain: Eukaryota
- Kingdom: Animalia
- Phylum: Arthropoda
- Class: Insecta
- Order: Lepidoptera
- Family: Gracillariidae
- Genus: Epicephala
- Species: E. microcarpa

Binomial name
- Epicephala microcarpa H.-H. Li, 2015

= Epicephala microcarpa =

Species of moth

Epicephala microcarpa is a moth of the family Gracillariidae first described by Hou-Hun Li in 2015. It is found in the Chinese regions of Guangxi and Hainan and in Mumbai, India.

The length of the forewings is 5−7.5 mm. The forewings are greyish brown to dark brown, the markings dense and compact. There are three pairs of white striae from both the costal and dorsal 2/3, 1/2 and 3/4 extending obliquely outward to the middle and the end of the cell, as well as outside of the cell. The dorsal striae are broader and clearer than the costal striae and the basal 1/6 of the dorsum with a broad white band. There is a narrow silvery-white fascia with a metallic reflection from the costal 5/6 to the dorsum, arched outward medially. The distal 1/6 is ochre brown, with a central black dot edged by a short white streak or a dot near the costa, with a white band along the dorsum. The hindwings are greyish brown.

The larva feeds on seeds in the fruit of Phyllanthus microcarpus.

== Etymology ==
The species is named after the host plant.
