= Epicephala euchalina =

Scientific classification
- Domain: Eukaryota
- Kingdom: Animalia
- Phylum: Arthropoda
- Class: Insecta
- Order: Lepidoptera
- Family: Gracillariidae
- Genus: Epicephala
- Species: E. euchalina

Binomial name
- Epicephala euchalina Meyrick, 1922

Synonyms
- Epicephala echalina De Prins & De Prins, 2005

Species of moth

Epicephala euchalina is a moth of the family Gracillariidae. It is known from Myanmar.
