= Epicephala zalosticha =

Scientific classification
- Domain: Eukaryota
- Kingdom: Animalia
- Phylum: Arthropoda
- Class: Insecta
- Order: Lepidoptera
- Family: Gracillariidae
- Genus: Epicephala
- Species: E. zalosticha

Binomial name
- Epicephala zalosticha Turner, 1940

Species of moth

Epicephala zalosticha is a moth of the family Gracillariidae. It is known from Queensland and New South Wales, Australia.
