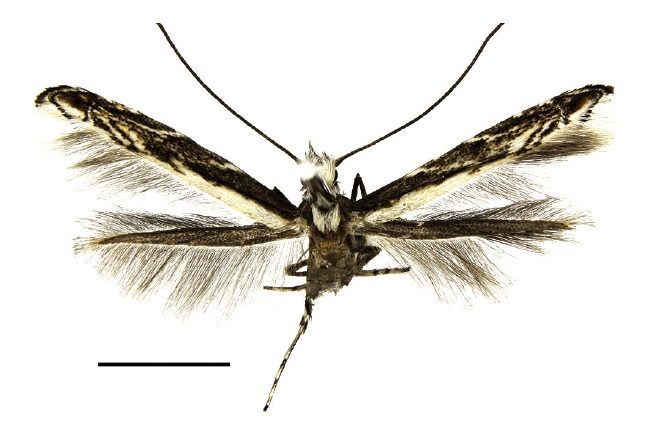

Scientific classification
- Domain: Eukaryota
- Kingdom: Animalia
- Phylum: Arthropoda
- Class: Insecta
- Order: Lepidoptera
- Family: Gracillariidae
- Genus: Epicephala
- Species: E. impolliniferens

Binomial name
- Epicephala impolliniferens Li, 2015

= Epicephala impolliniferens =

Species of moth

Epicephala impolliniferens is a moth of the family Gracillariidae. It is found in China (Hainan).

The length of the forewings is 7−10.5 mm. The forewings are brown to dark brown with three pairs of white striae from both the costal and dorsal margins at two-fifths, two-thirds and three-fourths, extending obliquely outward to the middle as well as to the end and outside of the cell, the second dorsal stria is longest and the third costal stria is shortest. The dorsal margin has a broad white band extending from the base to the tornus. There is also a silvery-white fascia with metallic reflection from the costal six-seventh to the dorsal margin, arched outward. The distal one-seventh is yellowish brown, with a central black dot, with an indistinct white dot at the costa and a white streak along the dorsal margin. The hindwings are yellowish white (especially at base) to brown.

The larvae feed on seeds in the fruits of Glochidion sphaerogynum.

== Etymology ==
The species name refers to the non-pollinating habit of the species and is derived from Latin im- (meaning not), pollinicus (meaning pollen) and ferre (meaning to carry, to bear).
