= Epicephala trigonophora =

Scientific classification
- Domain: Eukaryota
- Kingdom: Animalia
- Phylum: Arthropoda
- Class: Insecta
- Order: Lepidoptera
- Family: Gracillariidae
- Genus: Epicephala
- Species: E. trigonophora

Binomial name
- Epicephala trigonophora (Turner, 1900)

Synonyms
- Ornix trigonophora Turner, 1900

Species of moth

Epicephala trigonophora is a moth of the family Gracillariidae. It is known from Queensland, New South Wales in Australia and from Sri Lanka.
