= Epicephala epimicta =

Scientific classification
- Domain: Eukaryota
- Kingdom: Animalia
- Phylum: Arthropoda
- Class: Insecta
- Order: Lepidoptera
- Family: Gracillariidae
- Genus: Epicephala
- Species: E. epimicta

Binomial name
- Epicephala epimicta (Turner, 1913)

Synonyms
- Acrocercops epimicta Turner, 1913

Species of moth

Epicephala epimicta is a moth of the family Gracillariidae. It is known from Queensland, Australia.
