= Epicephala albistriatella =

Scientific classification
- Domain: Eukaryota
- Kingdom: Animalia
- Phylum: Arthropoda
- Class: Insecta
- Order: Lepidoptera
- Family: Gracillariidae
- Genus: Epicephala
- Species: E. albistriatella

Binomial name
- Epicephala albistriatella (Turner, 1894)

Synonyms
- Gracilaria albistriatella Turner, 1894

Species of moth

Epicephala albistriatella is a moth of the family Gracillariidae. It is known from Queensland, Australia.
