= Epicephala ancylopa =

Scientific classification
- Domain: Eukaryota
- Kingdom: Animalia
- Phylum: Arthropoda
- Class: Insecta
- Order: Lepidoptera
- Family: Gracillariidae
- Genus: Epicephala
- Species: E. ancylopa

Binomial name
- Epicephala ancylopa Meyrick, 1918

Species of moth

Epicephala ancylopa is a moth of the family Gracillariidae. It is known from Assam, India.
