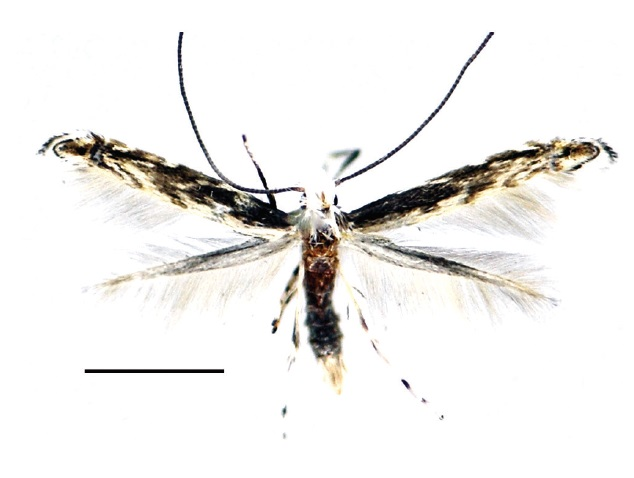

Scientific classification
- Domain: Eukaryota
- Kingdom: Animalia
- Phylum: Arthropoda
- Class: Insecta
- Order: Lepidoptera
- Family: Gracillariidae
- Genus: Epicephala
- Species: E. camurella

Binomial name
- Epicephala camurella Li, 2015

= Epicephala camurella =

Species of moth

Epicephala camurella is a moth of the family Gracillariidae. It is found in China (Hainan).

The length of the forewings is 7−10 mm. The forewings are greyish brown to brown, sometimes tinged with ochreous scales and with three pairs of white striae from both the costal and dorsal margins at one-third, three-fifths and four-fifths, extending obliquely outward to the middle and end of the cell as well as to outside of the cell. The second dorsal stria is longest and extends to six-seventh. The dorsal margin has a broad white band from the base to the tornus and there is a silvery-white fascia with metallic reflection from the costal six-seventh to the dorsal margin, nearly straight. The distal one-seventh is ochreous, with a central black dot, with a white dot at the costa and a broad white streak along the dorsal margin. The hindwings are grey.

The larvae feed on seeds in the fruits of Glochidion sphaerogynum and Glochidion wrightii.

== Etymology ==
The species name refers to the lamella antevaginalis being a pair of sclerotized and curved carinae in the female genitalia and is derived from Latin camur (meaning curved) and the postfix -ella.
