= Epicephala acrocarpa =

Scientific classification
- Domain: Eukaryota
- Kingdom: Animalia
- Phylum: Arthropoda
- Class: Insecta
- Order: Lepidoptera
- Family: Gracillariidae
- Genus: Epicephala
- Species: E. acrocarpa

Binomial name
- Epicephala acrocarpa Meyrick, 1927

Species of moth

Epicephala acrocarpa is a moth of the family Gracillariidae. It is known from Samoa.
