= Epicephala lativalvaris =

Scientific classification
- Domain: Eukaryota
- Kingdom: Animalia
- Phylum: Arthropoda
- Class: Insecta
- Order: Lepidoptera
- Family: Gracillariidae
- Genus: Epicephala
- Species: E. lativalvaris

Binomial name
- Epicephala lativalvaris Li, Wang & Zhang, 2012

Species of moth

Epicephala lativalvaris is a moth of the family Gracillariidae. It is found in China (Hong Kong, Guangdong, Fujian and Hainan).

The larvae feed on Breynia fruticosa and Breynia rostrata.
