= Epicephala pyrrhogastra =

Scientific classification
- Domain: Eukaryota
- Kingdom: Animalia
- Phylum: Arthropoda
- Class: Insecta
- Order: Lepidoptera
- Family: Gracillariidae
- Genus: Epicephala
- Species: E. pyrrhogastra

Binomial name
- Epicephala pyrrhogastra Meyrick, 1908

Species of moth

Epicephala pyrrhogastra is a moth of the family Gracillariidae. It is known from South Africa, Namibia and Zimbabwe.
