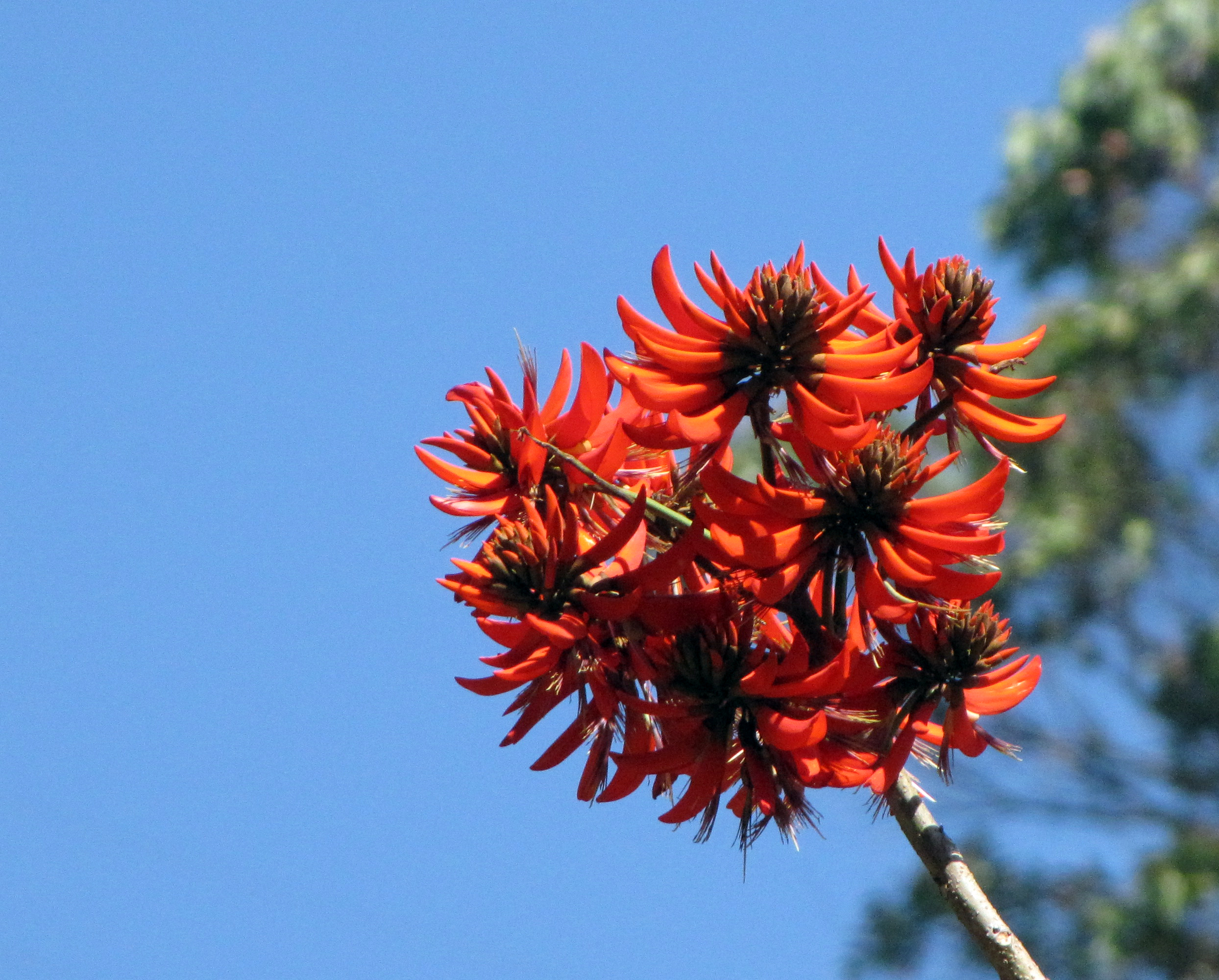

Scientific classification
- Kingdom: Plantae
- Clade: Embryophytes
- Clade: Tracheophytes
- Clade: Angiosperms
- Clade: Eudicots
- Clade: Rosids
- Order: Fabales
- Family: Fabaceae
- Subfamily: Faboideae
- Clade: Millettioids
- Tribe: Phaseoleae
- Genus: Erythrina
- Species: E. stricta

Binomial name
- Erythrina stricta Roxb.

Synonyms
- Corallodendron strictum (Roxb.) Kuntze; Erythrina stricta var. yunnanensis (H.T.Tsai & T.T.Yu ex S.K.Lee) R.Sha; Erythrina yunnanensis H.T.Tsai & T.T.Yu ex S.K.Lee; Micropteryx stricta (Roxb.) Walp.

= Erythrina stricta =

Species of plant

Erythrina stricta is a species of trees in the family Fabaceae identified by William Roxburgh in 1832. It is now placed in the subfamily Faboideae and the tribe Phaseoleae. This species has been recorded from the Indian subcontinent, Indochina and China. There is one valid variety: E. stricta var. suberosa. It is called တောင်ကသစ် in Burmese, ทองเดือนห้า (RTGS: thongduean, IPA: [tʰɔːŋdɯːan]) in Thai and 勁直刺桐, Pinyin: jìn zhí cìtóng in Chinese and വെൺമുരിക്ക് in Malayalam.

Erythrina stricta contains the indole alkaloid Hypaphorine

== Gallery ==
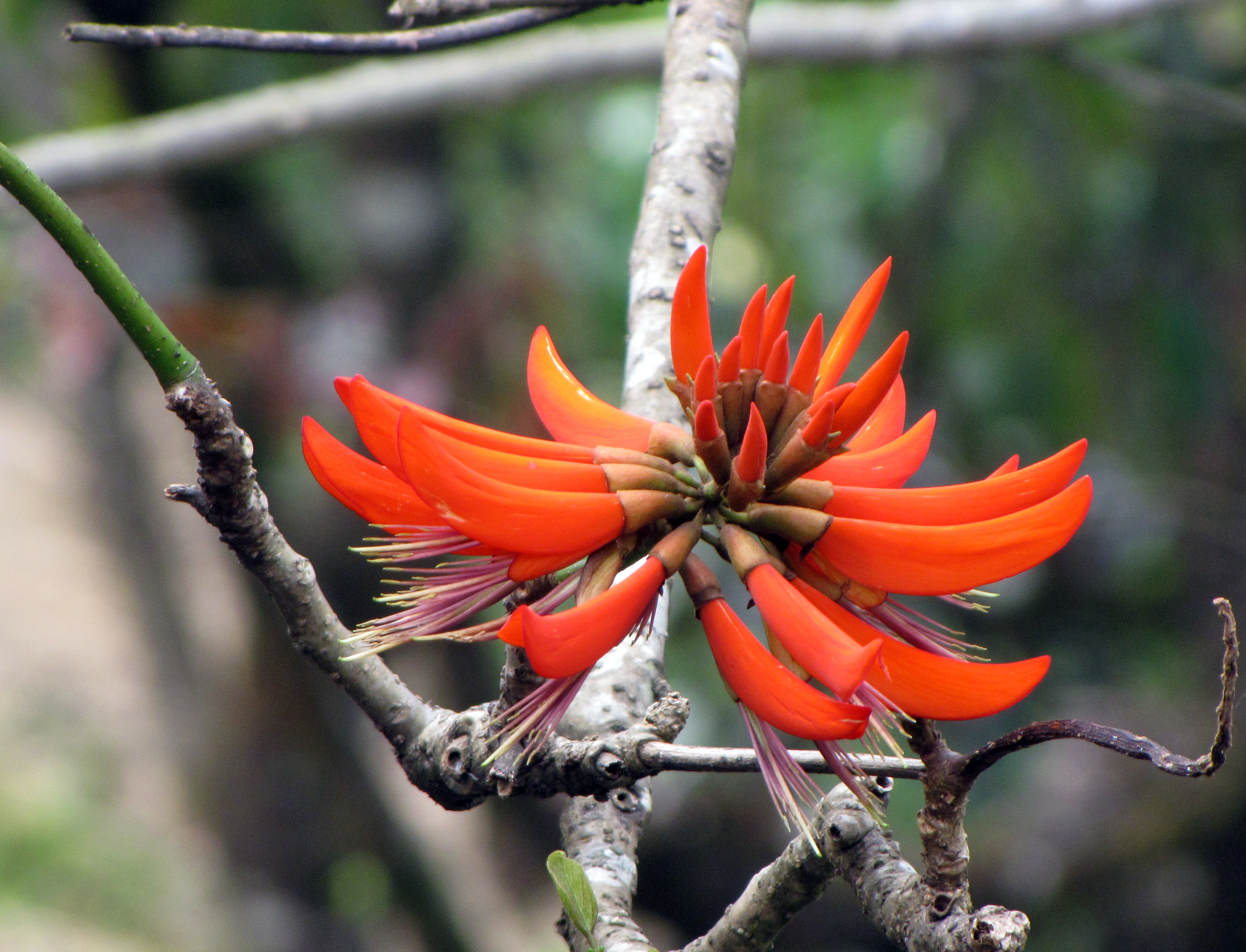

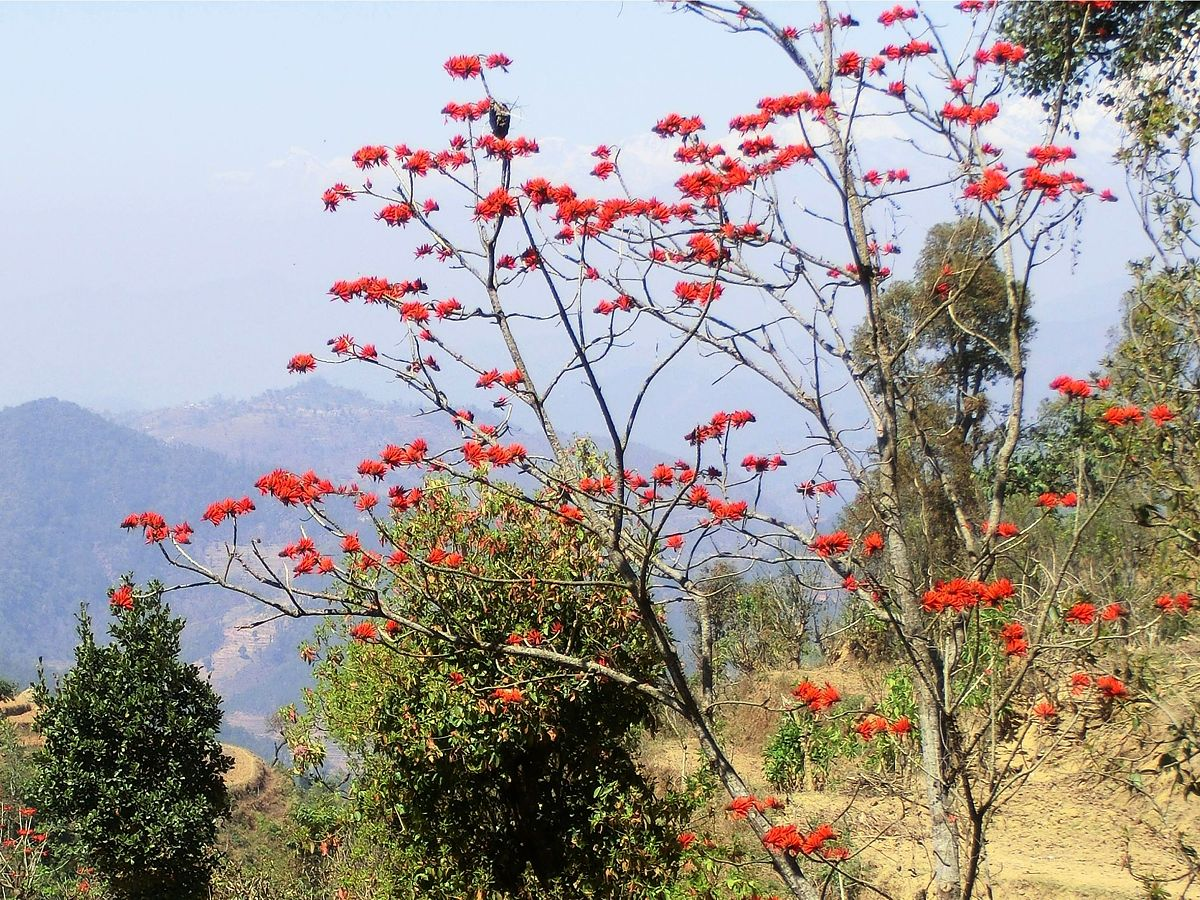

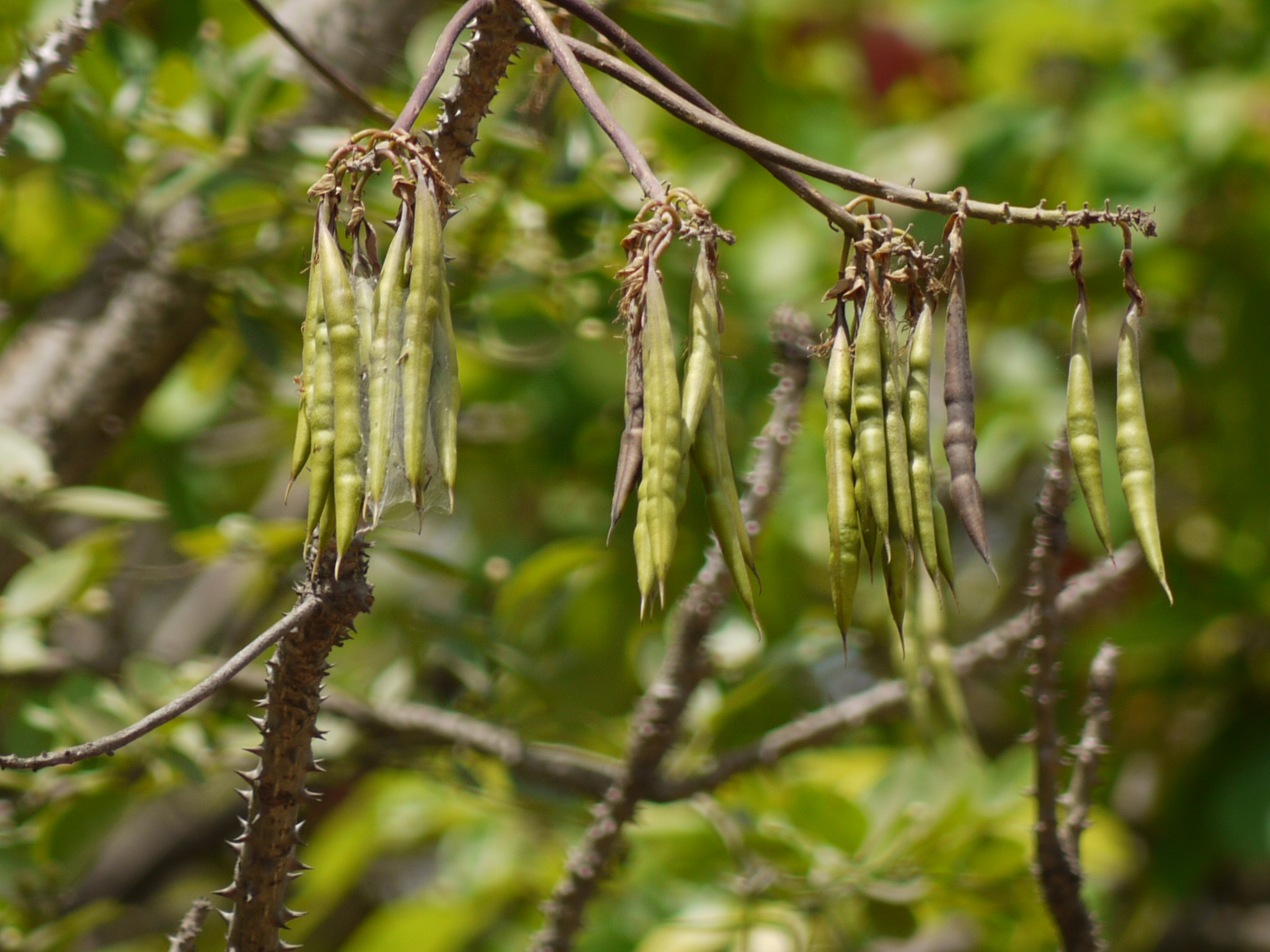

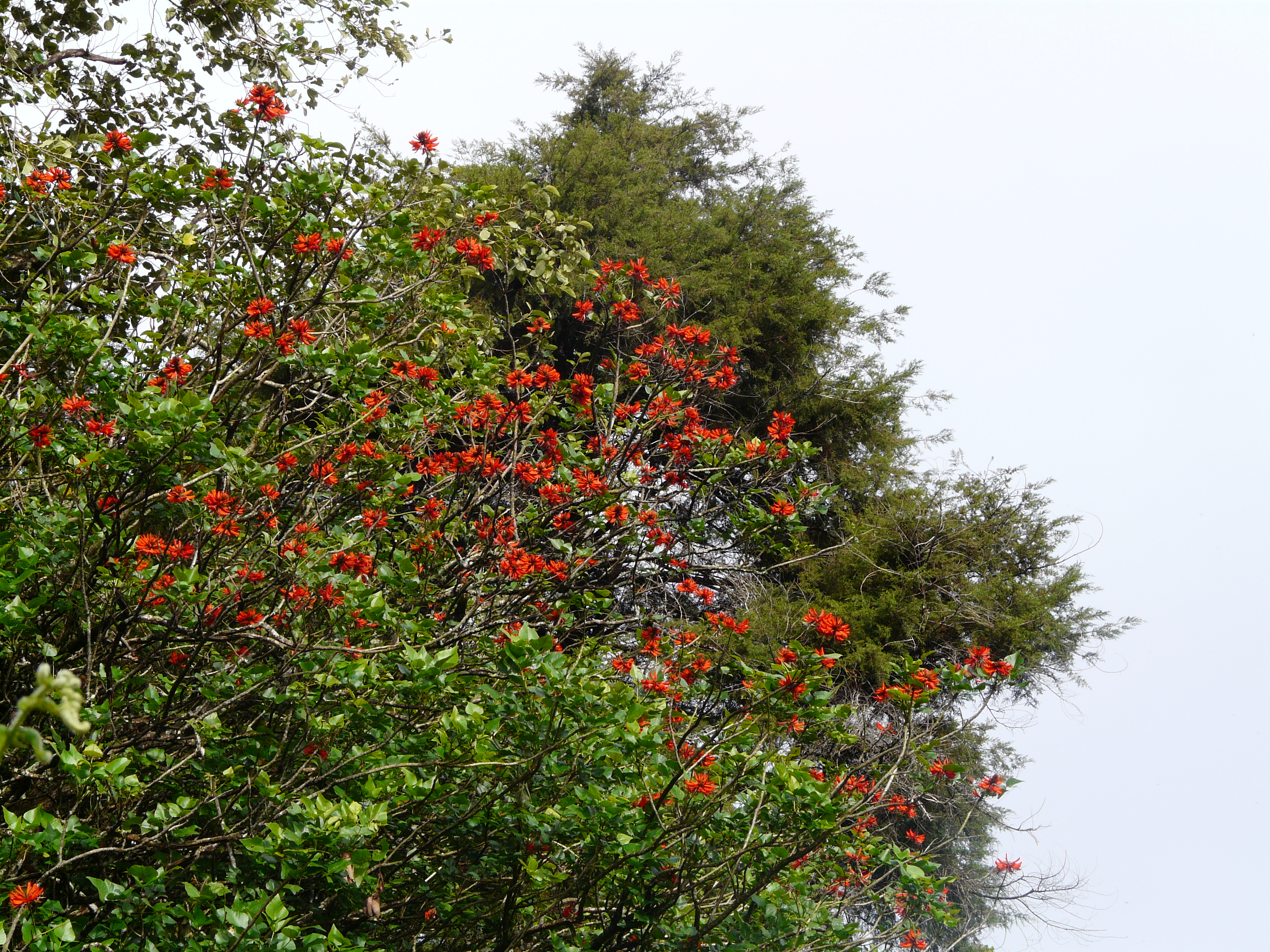
