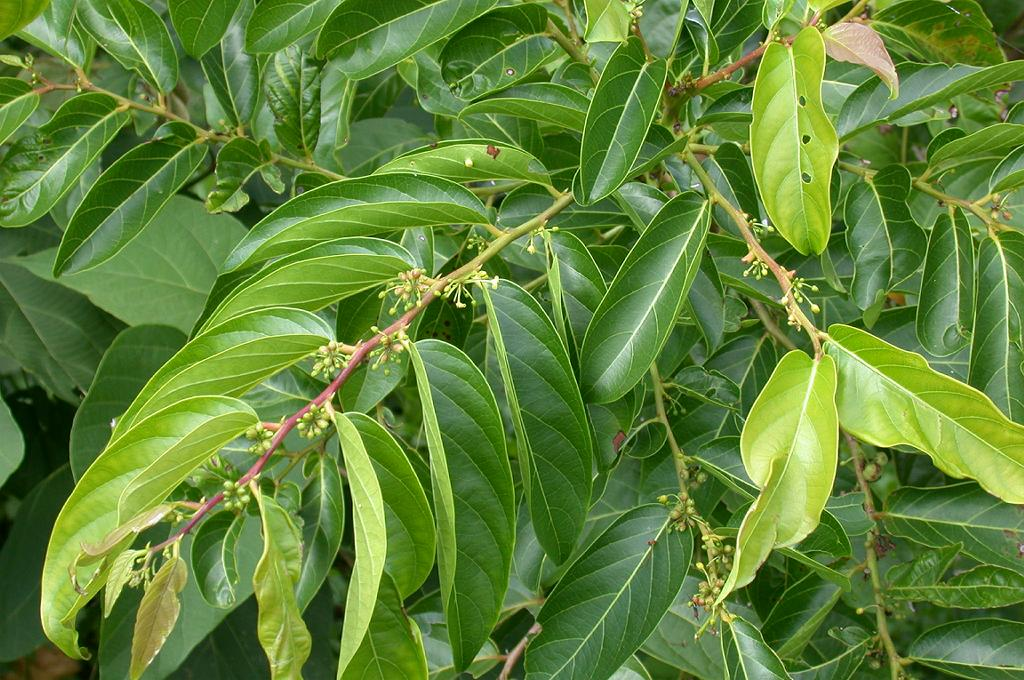

Conservation status
- Least Concern (IUCN 3.1)

Scientific classification
- Kingdom: Plantae
- Clade: Embryophytes
- Clade: Tracheophytes
- Clade: Angiosperms
- Clade: Eudicots
- Clade: Rosids
- Order: Malpighiales
- Family: Phyllanthaceae
- Genus: Phyllanthus
- Species: P. obliquus

Binomial name
- Phyllanthus obliquus (Willd.) Müll.Arg.

Varieties
- Phyllanthus obliquus var. mollis Müll.Arg.; Phyllanthus obliquus var. obliquus

Synonyms
- Synonymy: Agyneia obliqua Willd.; Bradleia obliqua (Willd.) Spreng.; Diasperus obliquus (Willd.) Kuntze; Glochidion obliquum (Willd.) Decne. synonyms of var. mollis: Bradleia arborescens (Blume) Steud.; Diasperus arborescens (Blume) Kuntze; Diasperus sclerophyllus (Hook.f.) Kuntze; Diasperus silheticus (Müll.Arg.) Kuntze; Diasperus teysmannii (Müll.Arg.) Kuntze; Glochidion arborescens Blume in Bijdr.; Glochidion bancanum Miq.; Glochidion sclerophyllum Hook.f.; Glochidion silheticum (Müll.Arg.) Croizat; Glochidion zeylanicum var. arborescens (Blume) Chakrab. & M.Gangop.; Phyllanthus arborescens (Blume) Müll.Arg.; Phyllanthus silheticus Müll.Arg.; Phyllanthus teysmannii Müll.Arg.; Phyllanthus zeylanicus var. arborescens (Blume) Chakrab. & N.P.Balakr. synonyms of var. obliquus: Agyneia flexuosa B.Heyne ex Benth., nom. nud.; Bradleia nitida Roxb.; Bradleia timoriensis Steud.; Bradleia zeylanica Gaertn.; Diasperus brunneus (Hook.f.) Kuntze; Diasperus hongkongensis (Müll.Arg.) Kuntze; Diasperus nitidus (Roxb.) Kuntze; Diasperus perakensis (Hook.f.) Kuntze; Diasperus zeylanicus (Gaertn.) Kuntze; Glochidion brunneum Hook.f.; Glochidion brunneum subsp. andamanicum N.P.Balakr. & Chakr.; Glochidion canaranum (Müll.Arg.) Bedd.; Glochidion ferdinandi var. supra-axillare (Benth.) F.M.Bailey; Glochidion glaberrimum Ridl.; Glochidion hongkongense Müll.Arg.; Glochidion lanceolatum var. liukiuense (Hayata) Hurus.; Glochidion littorale Benth., nom. illeg. homonym. post.; Glochidion liukiuense Hayata; Glochidion nitidum (Roxb.) Voigt; Glochidion pedunculatum Merr.; Glochidion perakense Hook.f.; Glochidion perakense var. supra-axillare (Benth.) Airy Shaw; Glochidion sumatranum Miq.; Glochidion supra-axillare (Benth.) Domin; Glochidion zeylanicum (Gaertn.) A.Juss.; Glochidion zeylanicum var. malayanum J.J.Sm.; Glochidion zeylanicum var. nitidum (Roxb.) Haines; Phyllanthus canaranus Müll.Arg.; Phyllanthus ferdinandi var. supra-axillaris Benth.; Phyllanthus gaertneri T.Kuros.; Phyllanthus hongkongensis (Müll.Arg.) Müll.Arg.; Phyllanthus nitidus (Roxb.) Reinw. ex Blume; Phyllanthus zeylanicus (Gaertn.) Müll.Arg.

= Phyllanthus obliquus =

Species of flowering plant

Phyllanthus obliquus is a species of flowering plant in the family Phyllanthaceae. It is a shrub or tree which ranges from the Indian subcontinent through Indochina, southern China, Taiwan, Japan, Malesia, and Papuasia to northern Australia and Vanuatu.

The species was first described as Agyneia obliqua by Carl Ludwig Willdenow in 1805. In 1865 Johannes Müller Argoviensis placed it in genus Phyllanthus as Phyllanthus obliquus.

The species has a wide distribution and a large population. The IUCN assesses its conservation status (under the synonym Glochidion zeylanicum) as least concern.

== Varieties ==
Two varieties are accepted.

- Phyllanthus obliquus var. mollis Müll.Arg.
- Phyllanthus obliquus var. obliquus
