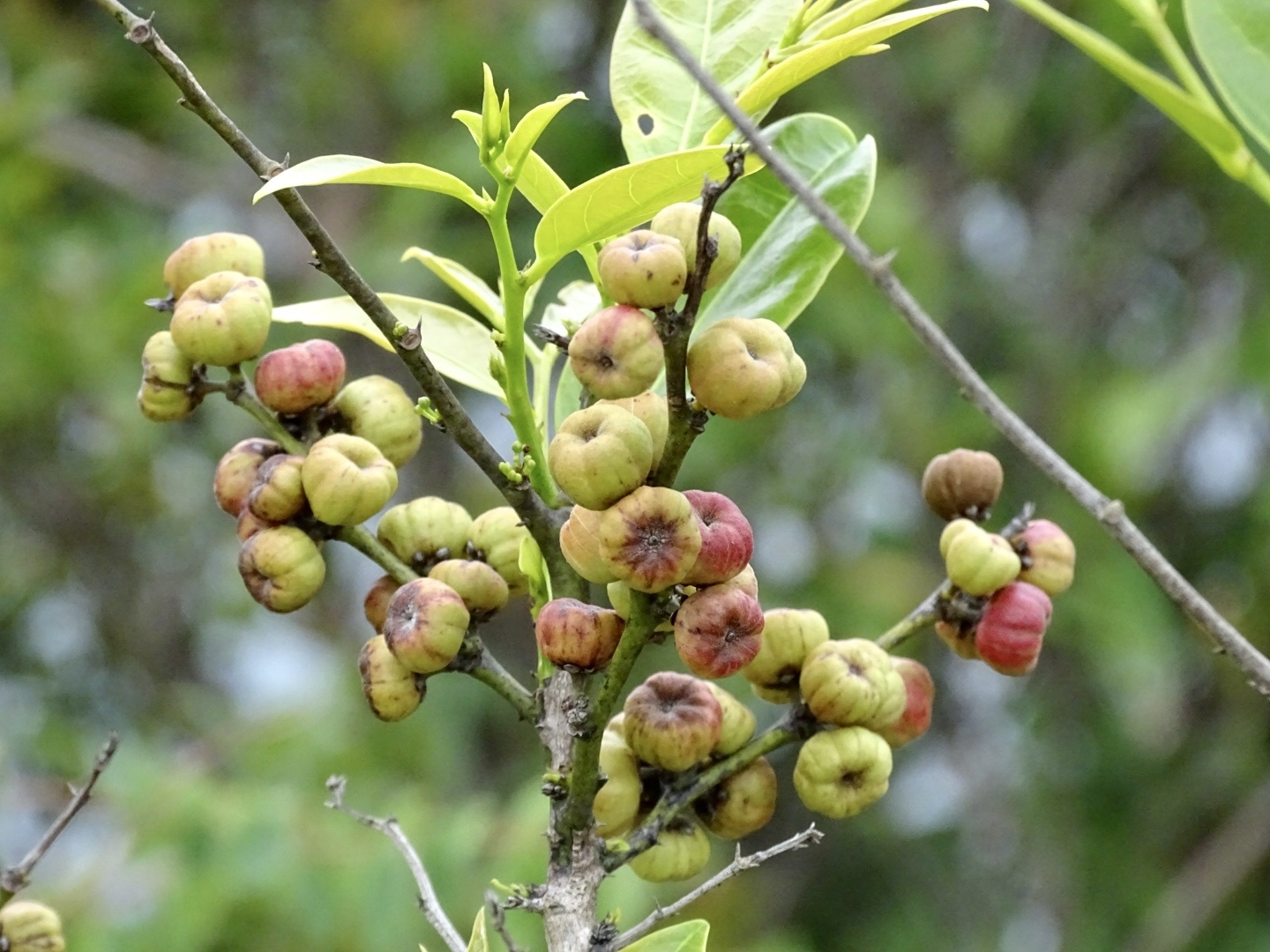

Conservation status
- Least Concern (IUCN 3.1)

Scientific classification
- Kingdom: Plantae
- Clade: Embryophytes
- Clade: Tracheophytes
- Clade: Angiosperms
- Clade: Eudicots
- Clade: Rosids
- Order: Malpighiales
- Family: Phyllanthaceae
- Genus: Phyllanthus
- Species: P. lanceolarius

Binomial name
- Phyllanthus lanceolarius (Roxb.) Müll.Arg.

Synonyms
- Bradleia lanceolaria Roxb. (1832); Diasperus benthamianus Kuntze (1891); Diasperus lanceolarius (Roxb.) Kuntze (1891); Glochidion cantoniense Hance (1866); Glochidion lanceolarium (Roxb.) Voigt (1845); Glochidion macrophyllum Benth. (1842); Glochidion subsessile var. birmanicum Chakrab. & M.Gangop. (1989); Glochisandra acuminata Wight (1852); Phyllanthus benthamianus Müll.Arg. (1865), nom. illeg.; Phyllanthus fraxinifolius G.Lodd. (1824), nom. subnud.

= Phyllanthus lanceolarius =

Species of flowering plant

Phyllanthus lanceolarius is a species of leafflower tree in the family Phyllanthaceae. It is native to Bangladesh, Cambodia, southern China (Fujian, Guangdong, Guangxi, Hainan, and Yunnan), India, Laos, Nepal, Thailand, and Vietnam. In Mandarin it is known as 艾胶算盘子 ( aijiao suanpanzi).

This species of tree is pollinated by the leafflower moth Epicephala lanceolaria in Guangdong and Hainan provinces and Hong Kong, China. The female moth actively pollinates the flowers and then oviposits into one or more carpels of the female flower. The caterpillars consume one of the two seeds in the carpel, and then pupate inside the hollow space within the carpels. Adult moths emerge from the pupae and remain within the fruits for about 20 days, and finally emerge from the fruits when the fruits dehisce, in mid-March to early April, around the same time as the maturation of new flowers.
