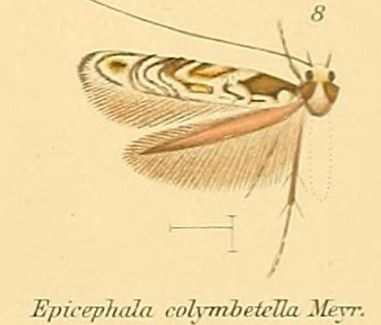
- Epicephala colymbetella

Scientific classification
- Domain: Eukaryota
- Kingdom: Animalia
- Phylum: Arthropoda
- Class: Insecta
- Order: Lepidoptera
- Family: Gracillariidae
- Subfamily: Gracillariinae
- Genus: Epicephala; Meyrick, 1880

Species
- See text

Synonyms
- Iraina Diakonoff, 1955; Leiocephala Kuznetzov & Baryschnikova, 2001

= Epicephala =

Genus of moths

Epicephala (leafflower moths) is a genus of moths in the family Gracillariidae.

Epicephala is of note in the fields of pollination biology and coevolution because many species in this genus are pollinators of plants in the genera Glochidion, Phyllanthus, and Breynia (Phyllanthaceae). These pollinating Epicephala actively pollinate the flowers of their host plants—thereby ensuring that the plants may produce viable seeds—but also lay eggs in the flowers' ovaries, where their larvae consume a subset of the developing seeds as nourishment. This relationship is similar to other specialized pollinating seed-predation mutualisms such as those between figs and fig wasps and yuccas and yucca moths.

Other species of Epicephala consume the seeds of species of Phyllanthus or Flueggea (Phyllanthaceae) as larvae, but do not pollinate their host plants as adults. At least some of these species have evolved from pollinating ancestors.

== Species ==
- Epicephala acrobaphes (Turner, 1900)
- Epicephala acrocarpa Meyrick, 1927
- Epicephala albifrons (Stainton, 1859)
- Epicephala albistriatella (Turner, 1894)
- Epicephala ancistropis Meyrick, 1935
- Epicephala ancylopa Meyrick, 1918
- Epicephala angustisaccula Li, 2015
- Epicephala anthophilia Kawakita A, Kato M, 2016
- Epicephala australis (Turner, 1896)
- Epicephala bathrobaphes Turner, 1947
- Epicephala bipollenella Zhang, Hu, Wang & Li, 2012
- Epicephala bromias Meyrick, 1910
- Epicephala calasiris Meyrick, 1908
- Epicephala camurella Li, 2015
- Epicephala colymbetella Meyrick, 1880
- Epicephala corruptrix Kawakita A, Kato M, 2016
- Epicephala domina Li, 2015
- Epicephala epimicta (Turner, 1913)
- Epicephala eriocarpa Zhang, Hu, Wang & Li, 2012
- Epicephala euchalina Meyrick, 1922
- Epicephala eugonia Turner, 1913
- Epicephala exetastis Meyrick, 1908
- Epicephala flagellata Meyrick, 1908
- Epicephala frenata Meyrick, 1908
- Epicephala haplodoxa Vári, 1961
- Epicephala homostola Vári, 1961
- Epicephala impolliniferens Li, 2015
- Epicephala jansei Vári, 1961
- Epicephala laeviclada Li, 2015
- Epicephala lanceolaria Zhang, Hu, Wang & Li, 2012
- Epicephala lanceolatella Kawakita A, Kato M, 2016
- Epicephala lativalvaris Zhang, Hu, Wang & Li, 2012
- Epicephala lomatographa Turner, 1913
- Epicephala microcarpa Li, 2015
- Epicephala mirivalvata Zhang, Hu, Wang & Li, 2012
- Epicephala nephelodes Turner, 1913
- Epicephala nudilingua Kawakita A, Kato M, 2016
- Epicephala obovatella Kawakita A, Kato M, 2016
- Epicephala orientale (Stainton, 1856)
- Epicephala parasitica Kawakita A, Kato M, 2016
- Epicephala pelopepla Vári, 1961
- Epicephala periplecta (Diakonoff, 1955)
- Epicephala perplexa Kawakita A, Kato M, 2016
- Epicephala pyrrhogastra Meyrick, 1908
- Epicephala relictella Kuznetzov, 1979
- Epicephala scythropis Meyrick, 1930
- Epicephala sphenitis Meyrick, 1931
- Epicephala spinula Clarke, 1986
- Epicephala spumosa Turner, 1947
- Epicephala squamella Kuznetzov & Baryshnikova, 2001
- Epicephala stauropa Meyrick, 1908
- Epicephala strepsiploca Meyrick, 1918
- Epicephala subtilis Meyrick, 1922
- Epicephala tephrostola Vári, 1961
- Epicephala tertiaria Li, 2015
- Epicephala trigonophora (Turner, 1900)
- Epicephala venenata Meyrick, 1935
- Epicephala vermiformis Meyrick, 1936
- Epicephala vitisidaea Zhang, Hu, Wang & Li, 2012
- Epicephala zalosticha Turner, 1940
