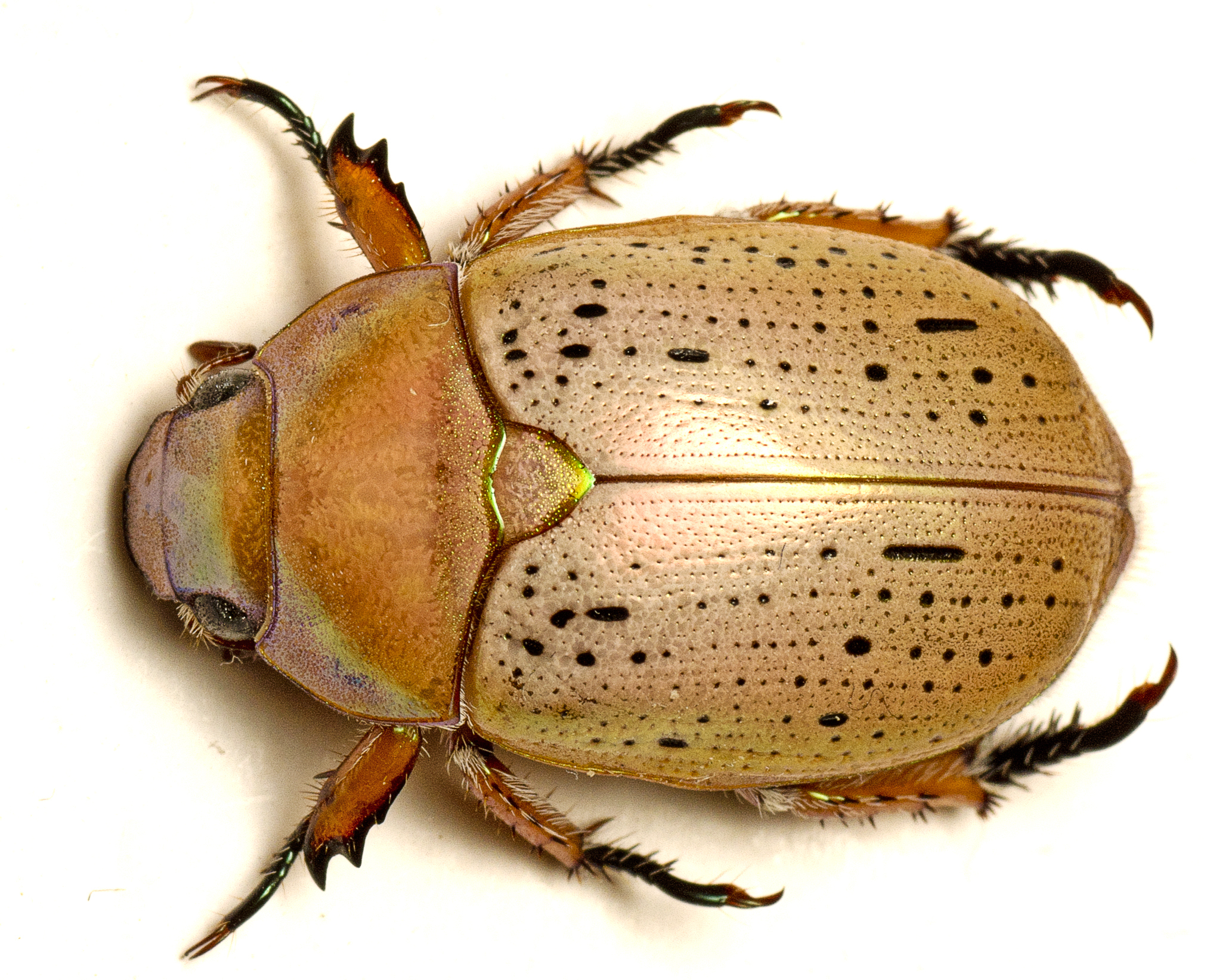

Scientific classification
- Kingdom: Animalia
- Phylum: Arthropoda
- Clade: Pancrustacea
- Class: Insecta
- Order: Coleoptera
- Suborder: Polyphaga
- Infraorder: Scarabaeiformia
- Family: Scarabaeidae
- Genus: Anoplognathus
- Species: A. porosus

Binomial name
- Anoplognathus porosus (Dalman, 1817)

Synonyms
- Anoplognathus inustus Kirby, 1818; Anoplognathus luridus Arrow, 1901; Anoplognathus pectoralis Burmeister, 1844; Rutela porosa Dalman, 1817

= Anoplognathus porosus =

Species of beetle

Anoplognathus porosus, commonly known as the washerwoman, is a species of scarab beetle within the genus Anoplognathus.

== Taxonomy ==
Anoplognathus porosus is commonly known as the "washerwoman". The scarab genus Anoplognathus to which the washerwoman belongs is commonly known as the Christmas beetles. The species epithet, porosus, meaning "with holes", refers to the coloured indentations on the beetle's wing-cases.

The species has several taxonomic synonyms.

== Description ==
Anoplognathus porosus can vary in appearance and the most inconsistent of the christmas beetles. Accordingly, it can be misindentified as the related species A. boisduvali, A. pallidicollis, and A. rugosus. A. porosus is generally pale reddish brown with both the head and the elytra tinted with a greenish-pink lustre or solidly darker brown. On the pronotum and the scutellum, the tinting is more visible The abdomen itself is a rich ruddy-brown with green shine. The legs are also light brown with a green lustre; the tarsi, however – the final segment of each leg – are black, yet still with greenish lustre. The final segment of the body, the pygidium, is pink or green in colour. It short white hairs on both the sides and its midline. The elytra bear black indents or punctures that form irregular lines. The underside of the beetles has white hairs; these are longer on the thorax and distributed everywhere except the midline and sparser and smaller on the abdomen where they are only found on the sides.

The sexes of A. porosus can be differentiated with examination of the clypeus. Male washerwomen range from 17 to 23 millimetres (0.67 to 0.91 in) long while the females are somewhat larger: between 20 and 25 millimetres (0.79 and 0.98 in) long.

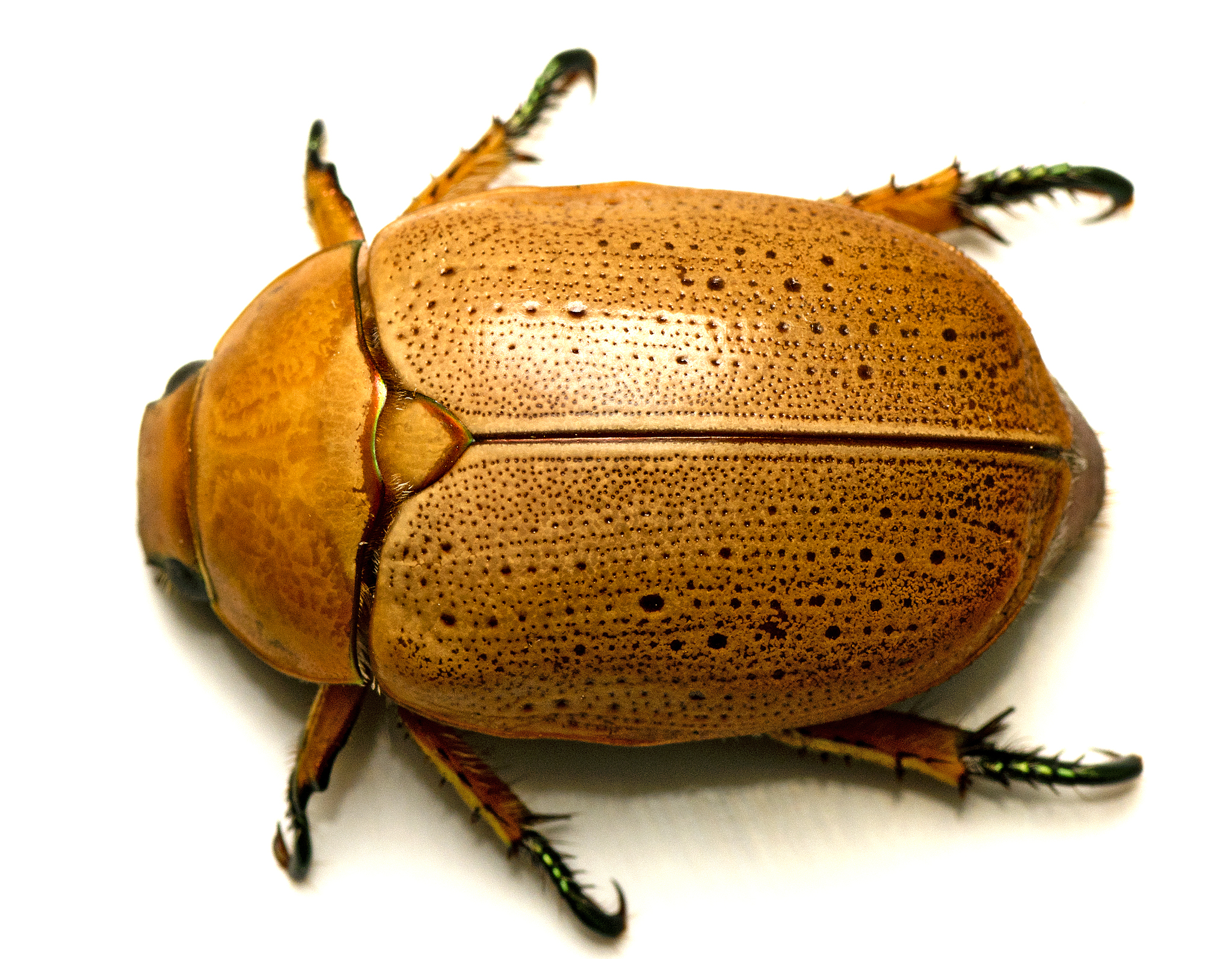
Dorsal view

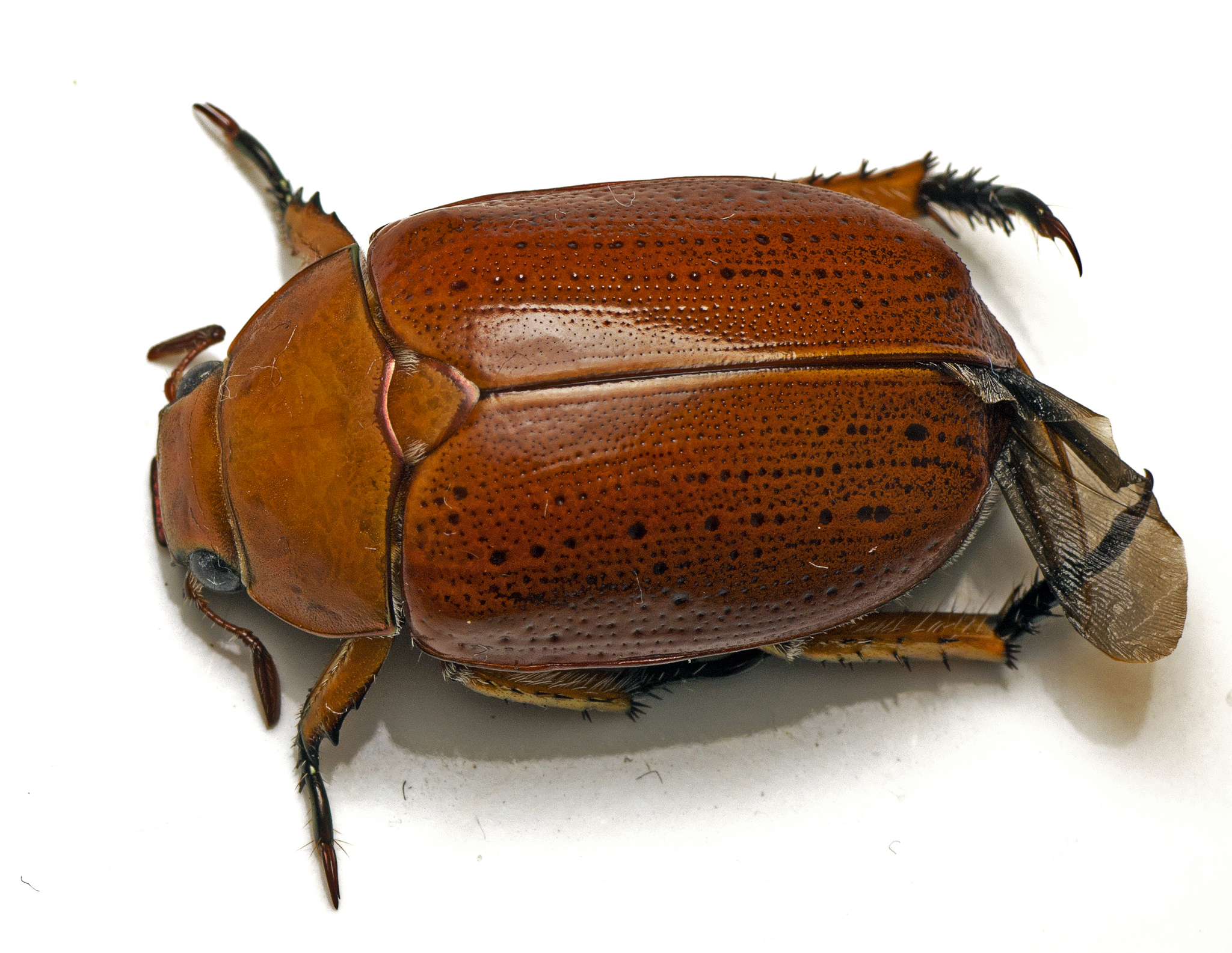
Dorsal view

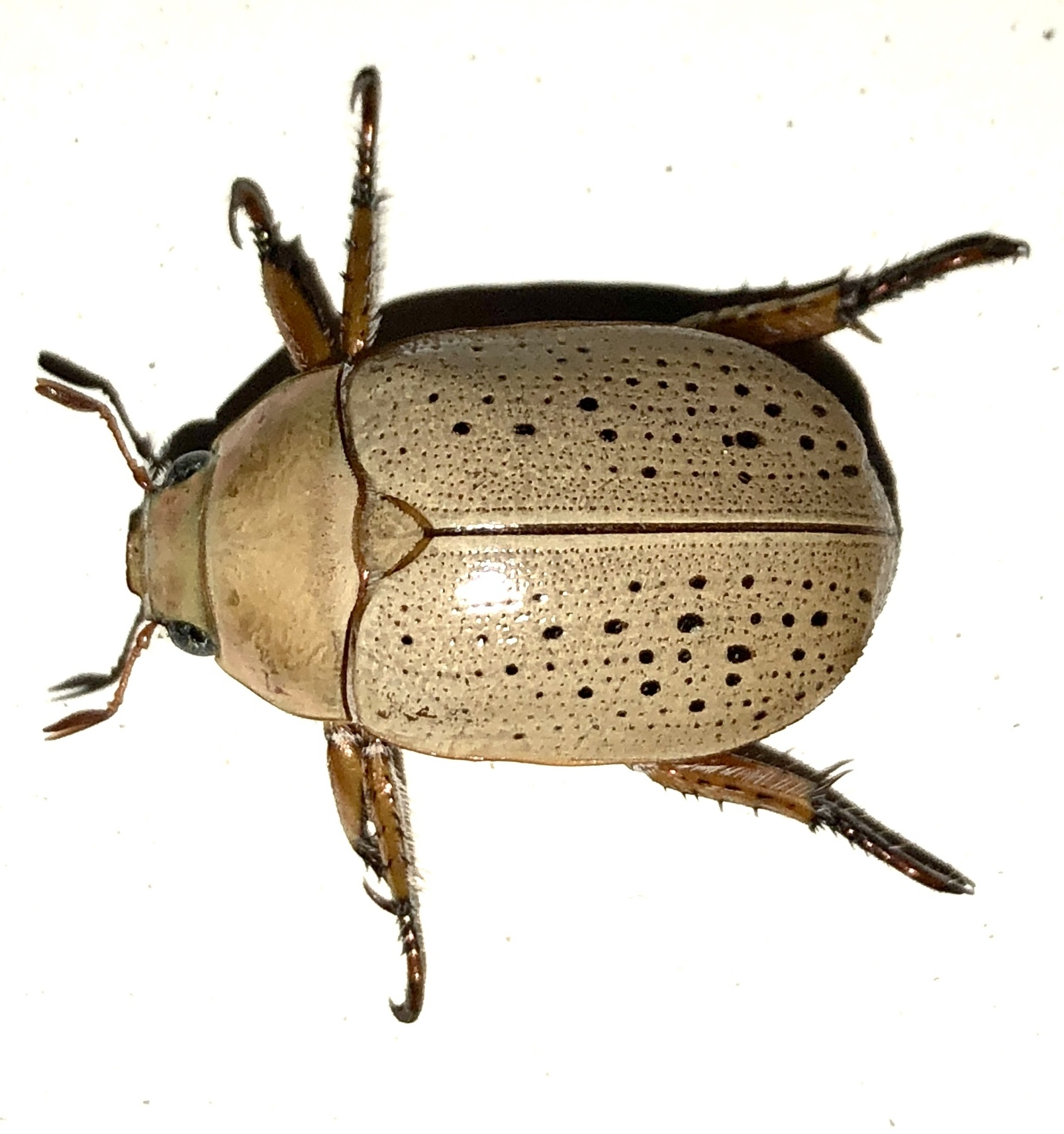
Dorsal view

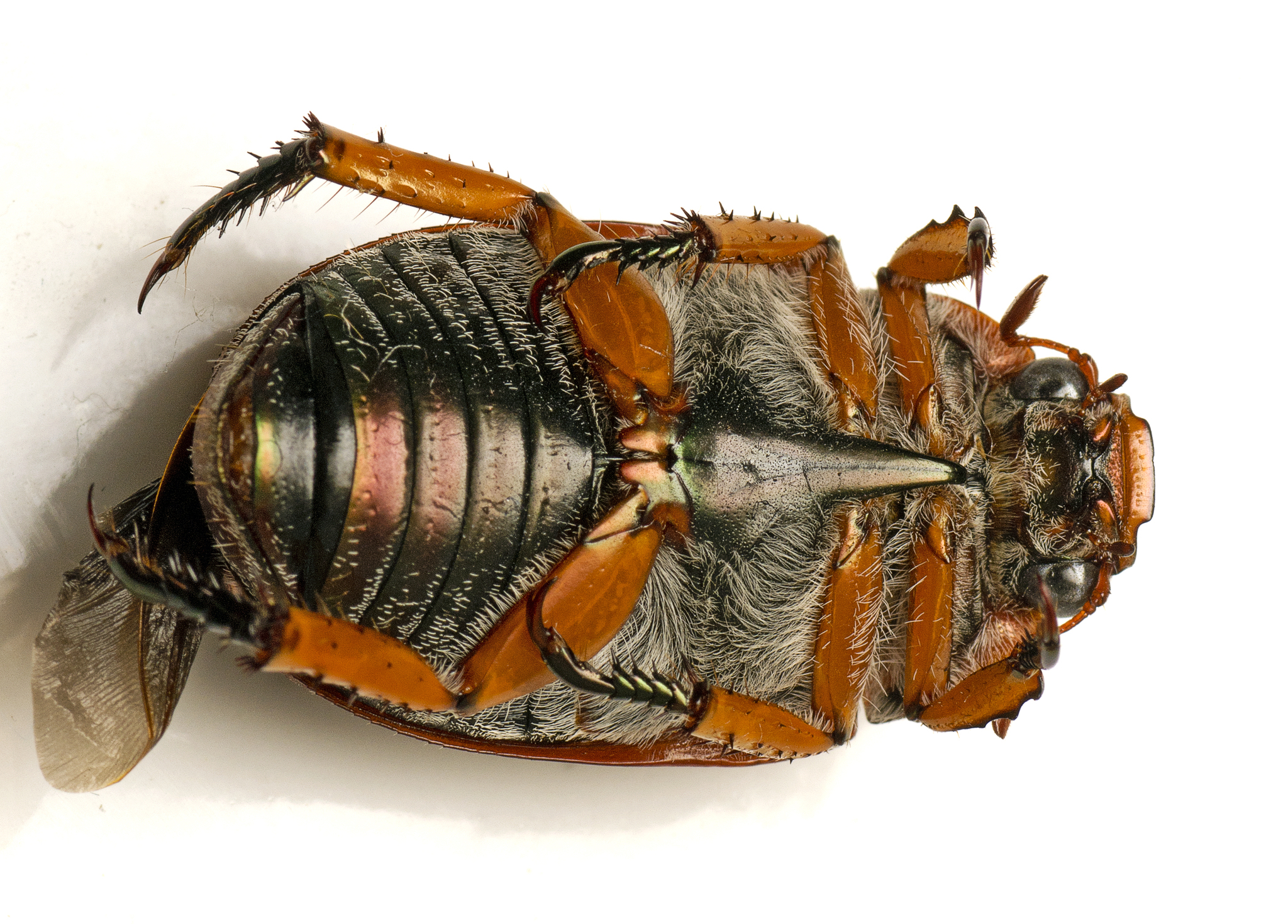
Ventral view

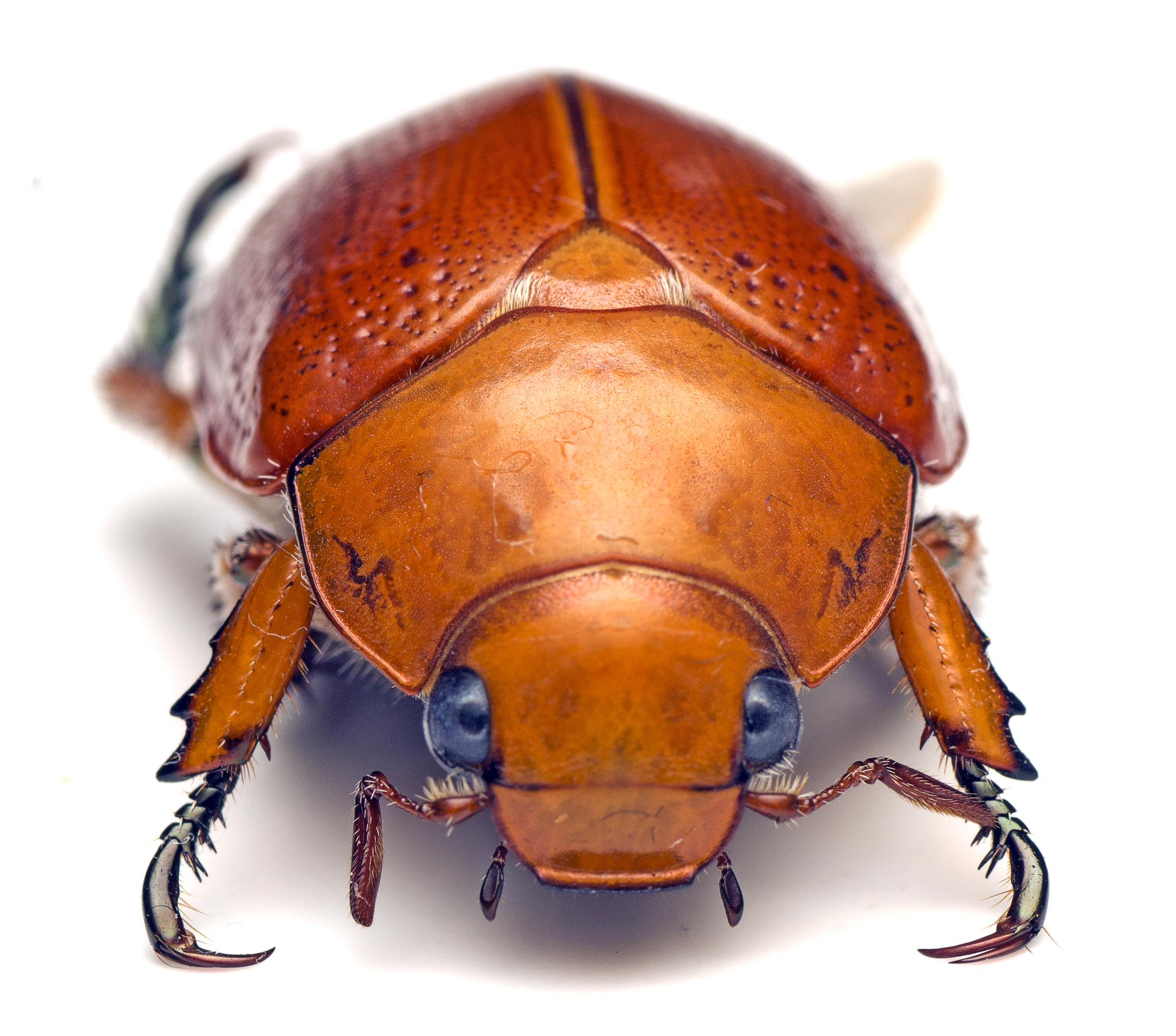
Frontal view

== Distribution ==
Anoplognathus porosus is found in Australia, in eastern Queensland from Cooktown through Brisbane and Toowoomba to Stanthorpe, and in New South Wales, including in the Blue Mountains, and as far inland as Cassilis and Cooma. It is found in the Australian Capital Territory and in the state of Victoria, from Ballarat through Melbourne to Wodonga and Bruthen. It is common in the Sydney area.
