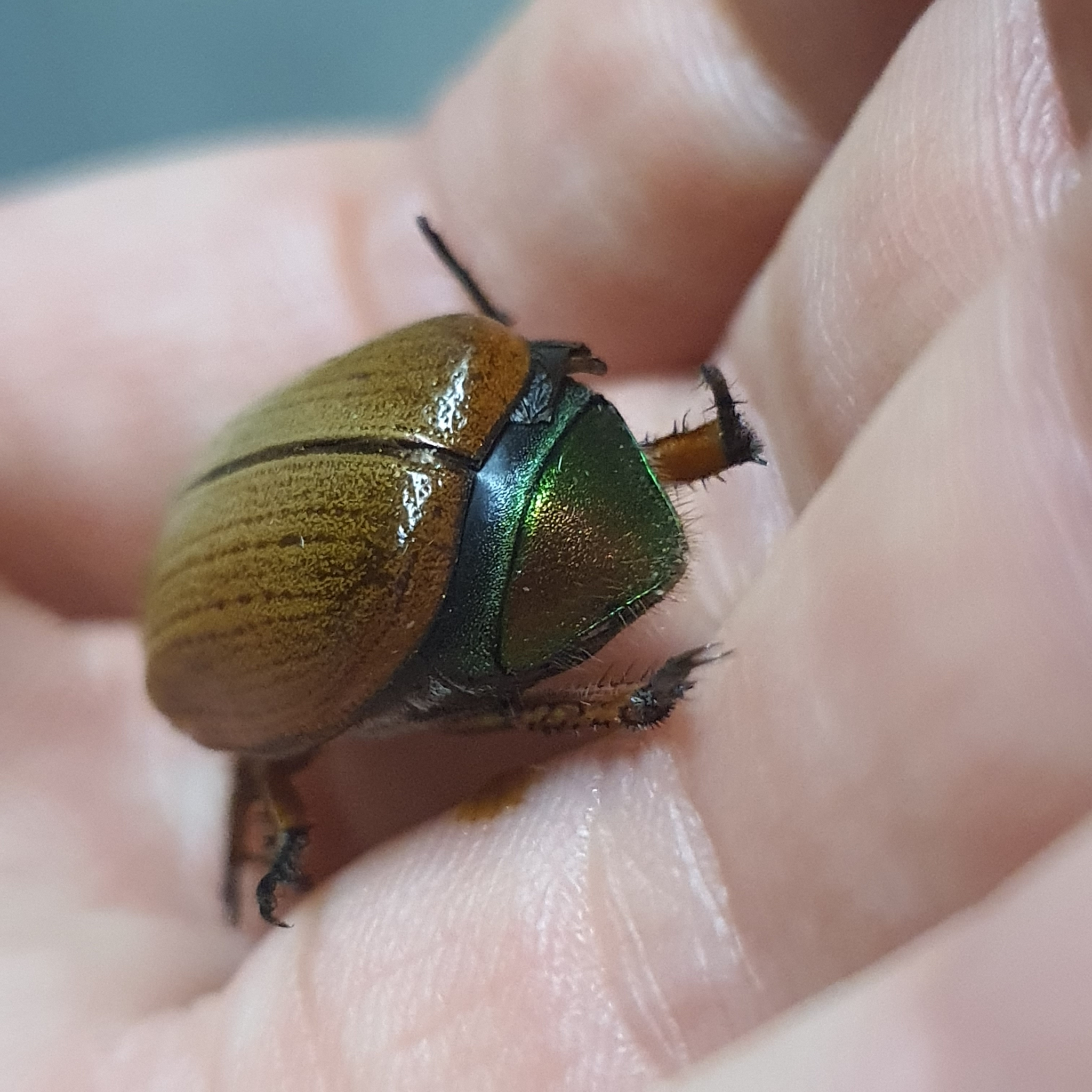

Scientific classification
- Kingdom: Animalia
- Phylum: Arthropoda
- Clade: Pancrustacea
- Class: Insecta
- Order: Coleoptera
- Suborder: Polyphaga
- Infraorder: Scarabaeiformia
- Family: Scarabaeidae
- Genus: Anoplognathus
- Species: A. brunnipennis

Binomial name
- Anoplognathus brunnipennis (Drapiez, 1819)

Synonyms
- Rutela chloropyra Drapiez, 1819; Anoplognathus nitidulus Boisduval, 1835; " Anoplognathus chloropyrus" Seidel & Reid, 2021

= Anoplognathus brunnipennis =

Species of beetle

Anoplognathus brunnipennis, commonly known as the brown- or golden-brown Christmas beetle, is a beetle of the family Scarabaeidae native to eastern Australia, being common in coastal Queensland, New South Wales and Victoria, the Great Dividing Range and the Murray-Darling river basin.

== History ==
Belgian naturalist Auguste Drapiez described the species in 1819 as Rutela chloropyra, reporting that it was found in summer in Australia. French naturalist Jean Baptiste Boisduval described Anoplognathus nitidulus in 1835. The latter name was recognized as the same species as the former and hence made a synonym by William John Macleay in 1873. The species name was misspelt chloropygus by Ohaus in a 1918 catalogue and picked up by many authors. A 2021 review indicated that the species was misidentified as Anoplognathus chloropygus, and thus made a synonym of Anoplognathus brunnipennis.

== Description ==
As its name suggests, the golden-brown Christmas beetle is a yellow- or biscuit-brown with a green or gold-red sheen. The abdomen and thorax are green with white hairs. The adult male is 19–23 mm long, while the female is 21–26 mm long.

== Feeding and relationship with humans ==
Like many of its relatives, the brown Christmas beetle has large strong jaws capable of chewing tough eucalypt leaves to the point of defoliating stands of trees, which can impact plantations. It is an economically important pest of eucalypt plantations in Victoria, and New South Wales. In particular it feeds on Tasmanian blue gum (Eucalyptus globulus), manna gum (E. viminalis), shining gum (E. nitens), flooded gum (E. grandis), white gum (E. dunnii), mountain white gum (E. dalrympleana) and broad-leaved peppermint (E. dives). It rarely eats Sydney blue gum (E. saligna), and ignores blackbutt (E. pilularis). Fieldwork in Coffs Harbour showed that brown Christmas beetle generally fed on leaves of intermediate age, avoiding new growth and old leaves, and trees of 2.5 m height and taller.

Clones of E. grandis have been selected and bred on the basis of unpalatability to this species to minimise damage to plantations.
