= Kerewong State Forest =

Coordinates: 31°38.0034′S 152°34.5858′E

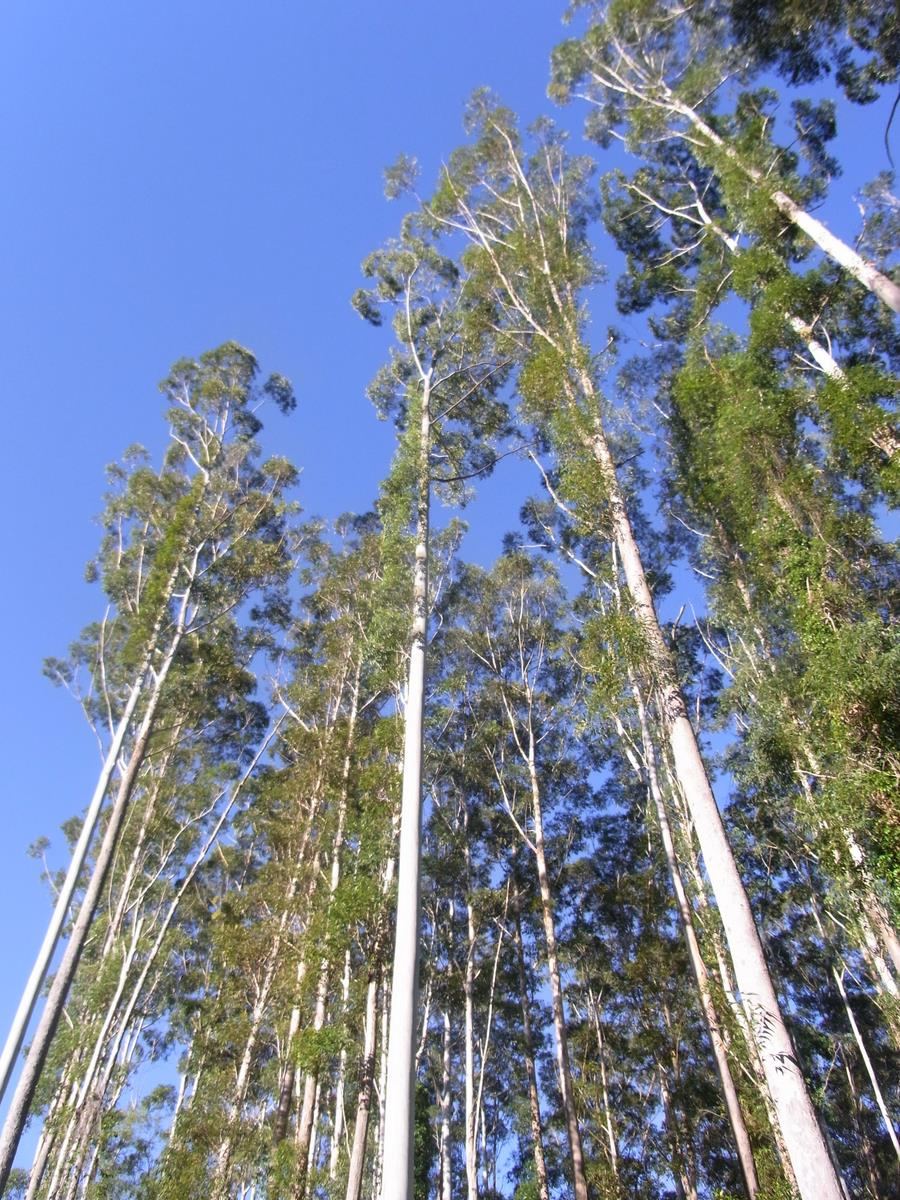
Flooded gum at Kerewong State Forest, Australia

Kerewong State Forest is situated in the Mid North Coast region of New South Wales, Australia. It is 4,020 hectares in size. The high rainfall and volcanically enriched soils produce tall eucalyptus forest and rainforest in gullies. Threatened fauna within the forest includes the greater glider, koala and stuttering frog. Widespread felling of trees is occurring in 2011 and 2012 at Kerewong State Forest, using modern logging techniques. The blackbutt is a preferred logging species.

== See also ==
- Environmental issues in Australia
