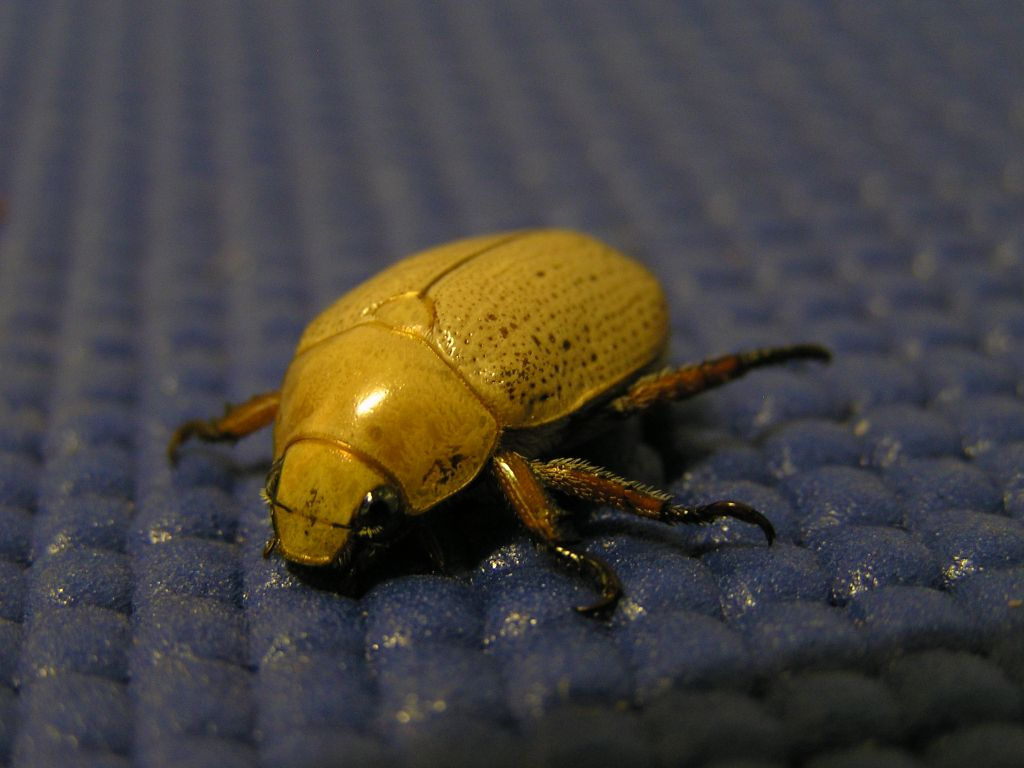

Scientific classification
- Domain: Eukaryota
- Kingdom: Animalia
- Phylum: Arthropoda
- Class: Insecta
- Order: Coleoptera
- Suborder: Polyphaga
- Infraorder: Scarabaeiformia
- Family: Scarabaeidae
- Genus: Anoplognathus
- Species: A. pallidicollis

Binomial name
- Anoplognathus pallidicollis Blanchard, 1851

= Anoplognathus pallidicollis =

Species of beetle

Anoplognathus pallidicollis is a relatively large beetle of the family Scarabaeidae, native to Australia. The beetle has a life span of 24 months and it grows up to 20 mm in length. Adults were once common in the summer months, particularly around Christmas, resulting in the common name of Christmas beetle for the species (and also for other members of its genus).

The beetles have rich glossy brown elytra and clypeus, and clawed legs covered in multiple barbs. Like all Anoplognathus species, the forelegs are of uneven lengths, possibly to better enable them to cling to thin Eucalyptus leaves.

The beetles are nocturnal, and are attracted to lights at night. They can often be found around outdoor lighting or crawling into homes. Studies show that they are most active around sunset and the hours immediately after.

Their numbers are believed to be in decline, most likely due to habitat loss.

== Life cycle ==
Larvae live underground, feeding on plant roots and decaying vegetation. They normally eat the roots of native grasses, but will also eat the roots of crops, lawns, and pasture. Vegetation in regions infested with Christmas beetle larvae withers and yellows; this is a common cause of dead or yellow patches seen in suburban Australian lawns.

In late winter or early spring, larvae move to the surface of the soil and pupate. Several weeks later, adults emerge. They wait for rain to soften the soil, allowing them to burrow out. Spring thunderstorms can trigger the emergence of large numbers of beetles in a short time. Conversely, beetles can be caught underground by extended dry periods, causing them to die without emerging.

Newly emerged adult beetles fly to a suitable nearby plant to feed and mate. They favour Eucalyptus leaves as food. They can cause severe defoliation when they emerge in large numbers in response to favourable weather conditions. After mating, females return to the soil to lay eggs.

Adult Christmas beetles have a long active cycle, remaining common throughout the entire southern summer..

== See also ==
- Anoplognathus viridiaeneus (King Christmas beetle)
