= Anoplognathus abnormis =

Scientific classification
- Domain: Eukaryota
- Kingdom: Animalia
- Phylum: Arthropoda
- Class: Insecta
- Order: Coleoptera
- Suborder: Polyphaga
- Infraorder: Scarabaeiformia
- Family: Scarabaeidae
- Genus: Anoplognathus
- Species: A. abnormis

Binomial name
- Anoplognathus abnormis MacLeay, 1873

Species of insect

Anoplognathus abnormis is a species of beetle within the family Scarabaeidae. The species is found in Queensland, Australia along its eastern coasts.
