= Anoplognathus aureus =

Scientific classification
- Kingdom: Animalia
- Phylum: Arthropoda
- Clade: Pancrustacea
- Class: Insecta
- Order: Coleoptera
- Suborder: Polyphaga
- Infraorder: Scarabaeiformia
- Family: Scarabaeidae
- Genus: Anoplognathus
- Species: A. aureus

Binomial name
- Anoplognathus aureus Waterhouse, 1889

Synonyms
- Calloodes frenchi Blackburn, 1890; Anoplognathus concinnus Blackburn, 1900

Species of beetle

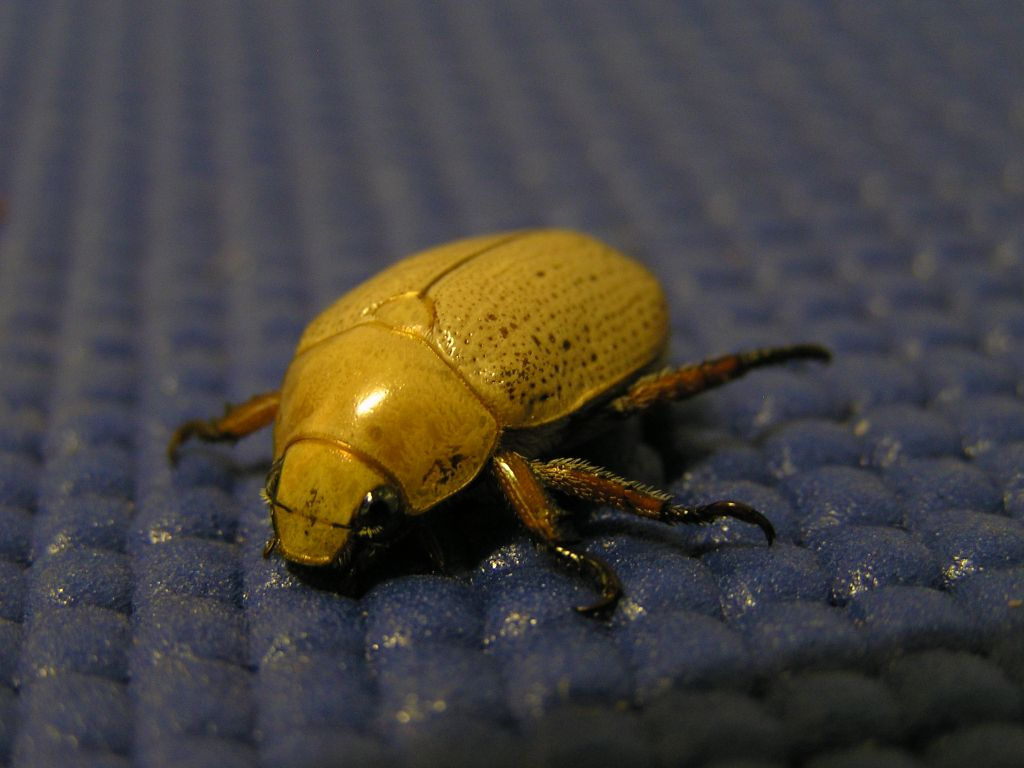
Anoplognathus aureus

Anoplognathus aureus, commonly known as the gold Christmas beetle, is a beetle of the family Scarabaeidae native to northern Australia, from northeastern Queensland to northern Western Australia. It is prized by collectors.

English entomologist Charles Owen Waterhouse described the gold Christmas beetle in 1889. The species name is the Latin adjective aureus "golden". The Reverend Thomas Blackburn described Calloodes frenchi in 1890, from a specimen given to him by Australian entomologist Charles French. Blackburn doubted the genus Calloodes was distinct from Anoplognathus. Blackburn described Anoplognathus concinnus in 1900, which turned out to be a red-brown colour variant of this species.

The beetle is a brass-gold, gold or shiny red-brown colour with red-brown legs. Red-brown beetles have a gold sheen on their mesosternum and abdomen, and behind the head. The male is 12.5–14 millimetres (0.49–0.55 in) long, while the female is 14.5–16.5 millimetres (0.57–0.65 in) long. The margins of the male's scutellum have a purple tinge. The male's clypeus has a narrowed apex while that of the female has a more rounded shape. The elytra are smooth or have fine grooves along the sides. The pygidium is shallowly convex in profile.

It is found in north Queensland from Cairns and Mossman south to Innisfail, and has been recorded from Broome in Western Australia. It is not commonly encountered.

It has been recorded on Hibiscus tiliaceus, Breynia cernua and Tristemma mauritianum. There is some evidence it attacks sugarcane crops on the Atherton Tableland.
