= Anoplognathus rhinastus =

Scientific classification
- Domain: Eukaryota
- Kingdom: Animalia
- Phylum: Arthropoda
- Class: Insecta
- Order: Coleoptera
- Suborder: Polyphaga
- Infraorder: Scarabaeiformia
- Family: Scarabaeidae
- Genus: Anoplognathus
- Species: A. rhinastus

Binomial name
- Anoplognathus rhinastus (Blanchard,1850)

Species of beetle

Anoplognathus rhinastus is a species of beetle in the family Scarabaeidae native to eastern Australia. It is about 24-25 mm in length.
