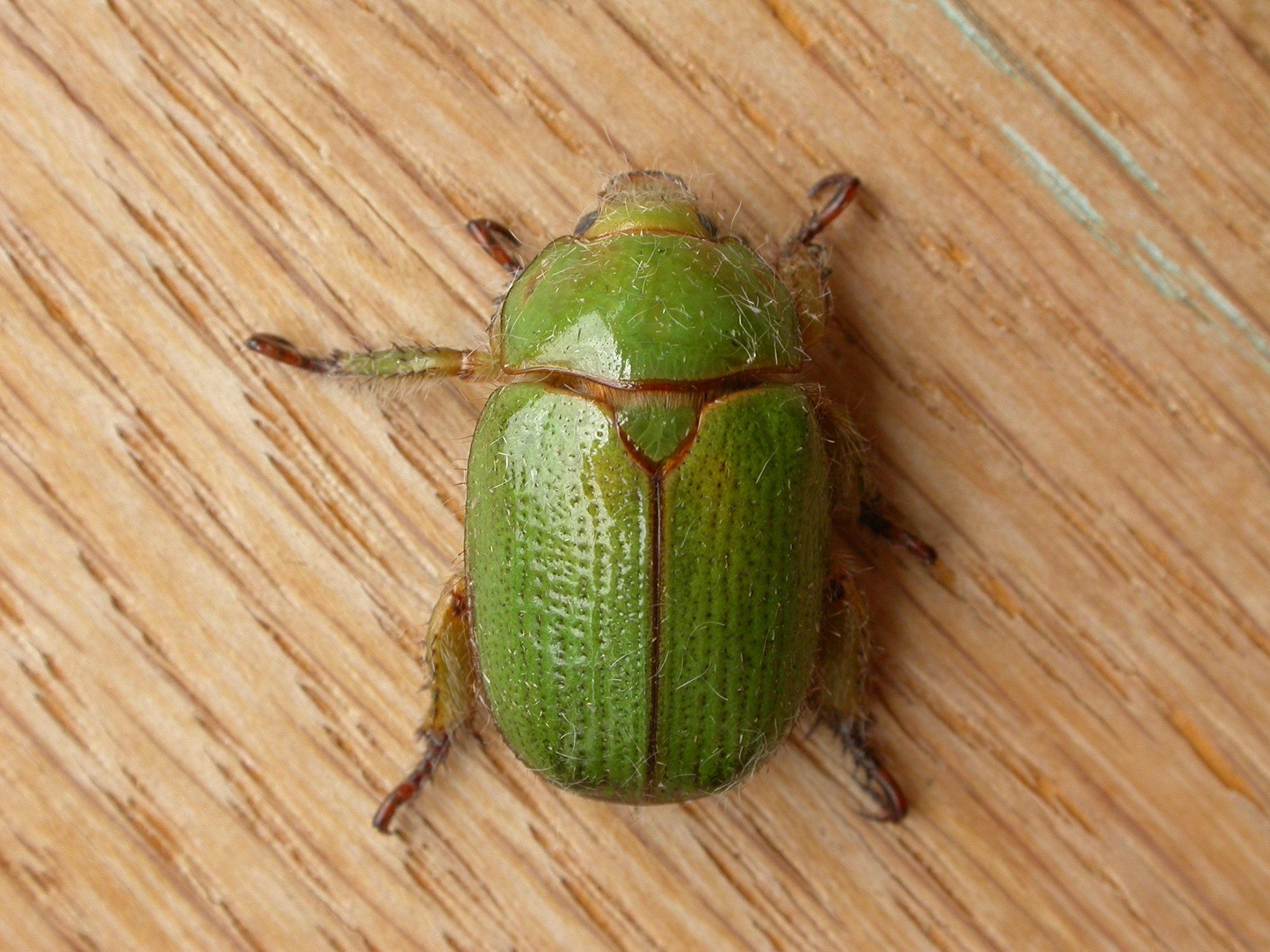

Scientific classification
- Domain: Eukaryota
- Kingdom: Animalia
- Phylum: Arthropoda
- Class: Insecta
- Order: Coleoptera
- Suborder: Polyphaga
- Infraorder: Scarabaeiformia
- Family: Scarabaeidae
- Genus: Anoplognathus
- Species: A. prasinus

Binomial name
- Anoplognathus prasinus (Castelnau, 1840)

Synonyms
- Paranonca prasina Castelnau

= Anoplognathus prasinus =

Species of beetle

Anoplognathus prasinus, commonly known as the green Christmas beetle, is a beetle of the family Scarabaeidae native to eastern Australia.

The green Christmas beetle was described by Francis de Laporte de Castelnau in 1840 as Paranonca prasina. It was transferred to the genus Anoplognathus in 1873 by Lansberge.

The species is apple green overall, with red-yellow translucent edging to its head, clypeofrontal suture and pronotum. The abdomen is a brown-green colour, the coxae and legs are a yellow-green and tarsi red-brown. The adult male is 18–20 mm long while the female is 21–22 mm long.
