= Anoplognathus smaragdinus =

Scientific classification
- Kingdom: Animalia
- Phylum: Arthropoda
- Class: Insecta
- Order: Coleoptera
- Suborder: Polyphaga
- Infraorder: Scarabaeiformia
- Family: Scarabaeidae
- Genus: Anoplognathus
- Species: A. smaragdinus

Binomial name
- Anoplognathus smaragdinus Ohaus, 1904

Species of beetle

Anoplognathus smaragdinus is a beetle of the family Scarabaeidae native to Queensland, Australia.
