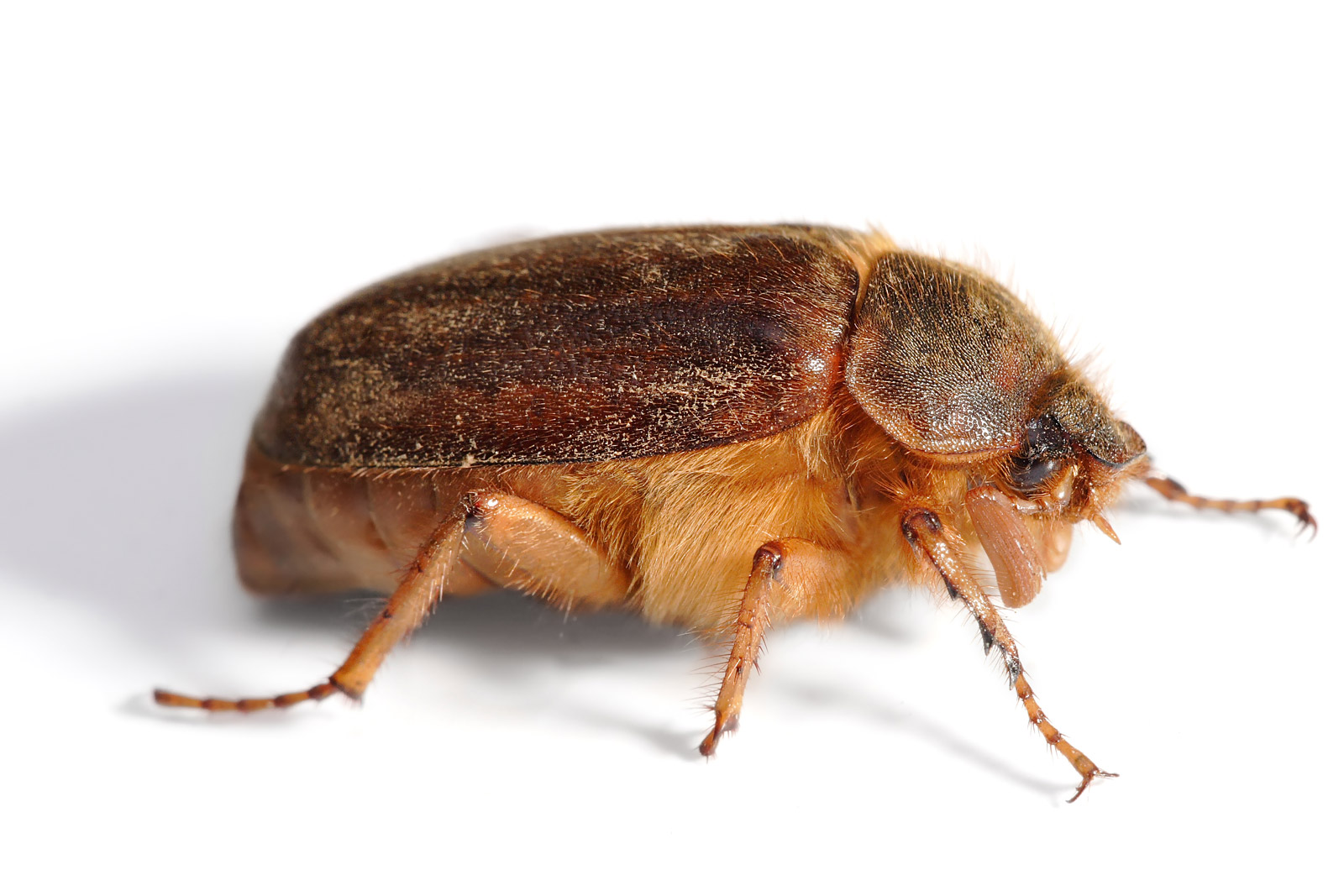

Scientific classification
- Kingdom: Animalia
- Phylum: Arthropoda
- Clade: Pancrustacea
- Class: Insecta
- Order: Coleoptera
- Suborder: Polyphaga
- Infraorder: Scarabaeiformia
- Family: Scarabaeidae
- Genus: Anoplognathus
- Species: A. olivieri

Binomial name
- Anoplognathus olivieri (Schönherr & Dalman, 1817)

Synonyms
- Anoplognathus duponti Boisduval, 1835; Anoplognathus impressus Boisduval, 1835; Rutela lacunosa Thunberg, 1822; Rutela olivieri Schönherr & Dalman, 1817

= Anoplognathus olivieri =

Species of beetle

Anoplognathus olivieri is a species of beetle within the genus Anoplognathus.

== Description ==
Anoplognathus olivieri is distinguished by laterally expanded female elytra, smooth mostly impunctate ventrites and shiny pygidium with apical tuft of setae
