= Anoplognathus parvulus =

Scientific classification
- Domain: Eukaryota
- Kingdom: Animalia
- Phylum: Arthropoda
- Class: Insecta
- Order: Coleoptera
- Suborder: Polyphaga
- Infraorder: Scarabaeiformia
- Family: Scarabaeidae
- Genus: Anoplognathus
- Species: A. parvulus

Binomial name
- Anoplognathus parvulus Waterhouse, 1873

Species of beetle

Anoplognathus parvulus is a beetle of the family Scarabaeidae native to eastern Australia.
