= Anoplognathus flavipennis =

Scientific classification
- Kingdom: Animalia
- Phylum: Arthropoda
- Class: Insecta
- Order: Coleoptera
- Suborder: Polyphaga
- Infraorder: Scarabaeiformia
- Family: Scarabaeidae
- Genus: Anoplognathus
- Species: A. flavipennis

Binomial name
- Anoplognathus flavipennis Boisduval, 1835

Synonyms
- Anoplognathus castaneipennis Castelnau, 1840; Anoplognathus flavipennis subsp. quadrimaculata Ohaus, 1898

Species of insect

Anoplognathus flavipennis is a species of beetle within the genus Anoplognathus.

== Description ==
Anoplognathus flavipennis is distinguished by "dull pygidium setose, and short rounded mesoventral process".

== Range ==
This species is found from Southern Queensland down to northwest Sydney.
