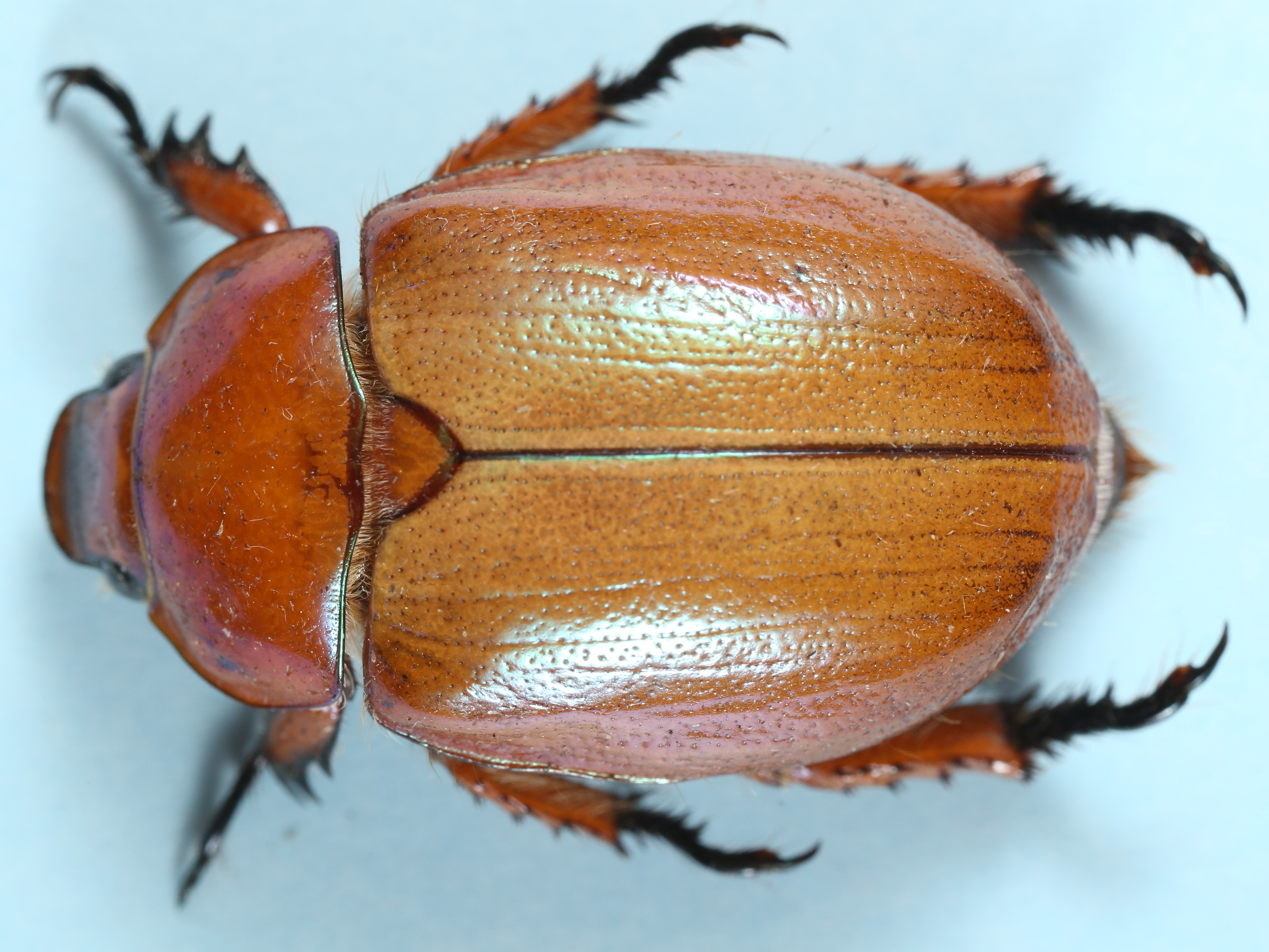

Scientific classification
- Domain: Eukaryota
- Kingdom: Animalia
- Phylum: Arthropoda
- Class: Insecta
- Order: Coleoptera
- Suborder: Polyphaga
- Infraorder: Scarabaeiformia
- Family: Scarabaeidae
- Genus: Anoplognathus
- Species: A. viriditarsis

Binomial name
- Anoplognathus viriditarsis Leach, 1815

Synonyms
- Rutela analis Dalman, 1817; Anoplognathus analis Boisduval, 1835; Anoplognathus reticulatus Boisduval, 1835; Anoplognathus impressifrons Boisduval, 1835; Anoplognathus viridicollis Macleay, 1873

= Anoplognathus viriditarsis =

Species of beetle

Anoplognathus viriditarsis is a beetle of the family Scarabaeidae native to eastern Australia.
