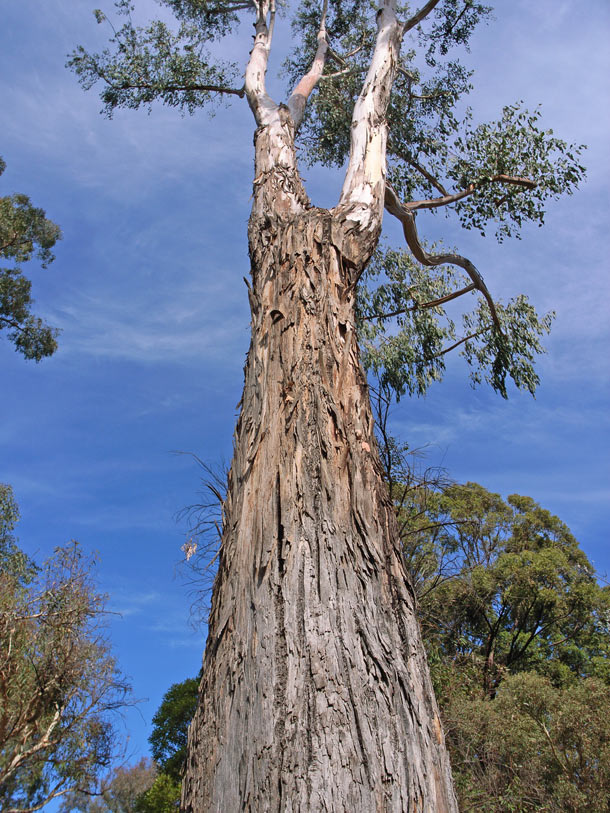
- Eucalyptus dunnii in the ANBG

Conservation status
- Near Threatened (IUCN 3.1)

Scientific classification
- Kingdom: Plantae
- Clade: Tracheophytes
- Clade: Angiosperms
- Clade: Eudicots
- Clade: Rosids
- Order: Myrtales
- Family: Myrtaceae
- Genus: Eucalyptus
- Species: E. dunnii

Binomial name
- Eucalyptus dunnii Maiden

= Eucalyptus dunnii =

Dunn's white gum

Species of eucalyptus

Eucalyptus dunnii, commonly known as Dunn's white gum or simply white gum, is a species of medium-sized to tall tree that is endemic to eastern Australia. It has rough bark near the base, smooth white to cream-coloured bark above, lance-shaped to curved adult leaves, flower buds in groups of seven, white flowers and cup-shaped, conical or hemispherical fruit.

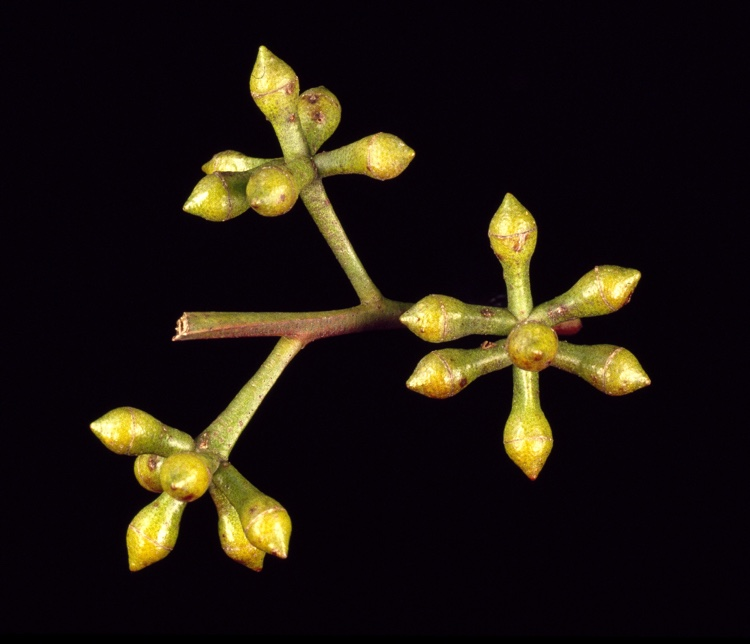
Flower buds

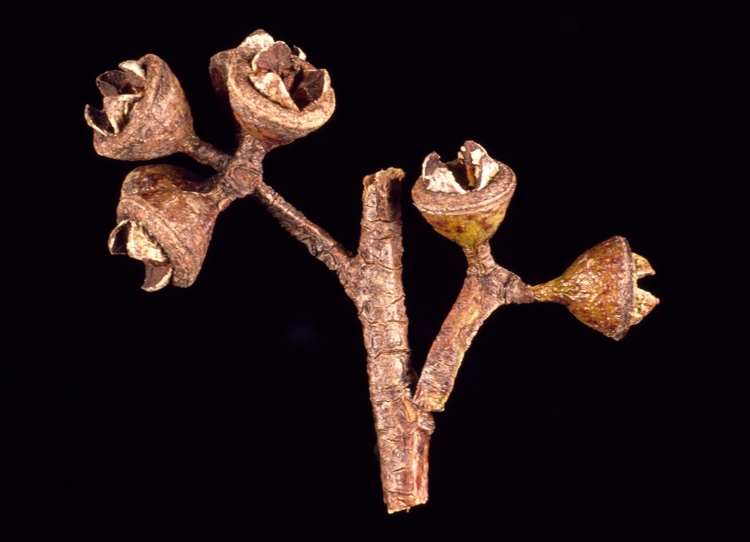
Fruit

== Description ==
Eucalyptus dunnii is a tree that typically grows to a height of 50 m (160 ft) and forms a lignotuber. It has rough, greyish, corky, fibrous or flaky bark on the lower part of the trunk, smooth white or grey bark above that is shed in short ribbons. Young plants and coppice regrowth have egg-shaped to elliptical or almost round leaves that are 25–150 mm (0.98–5.91 in) long and 18–110 mm (0.71–4.33 in) wide, arranged in opposite pairs. Adult leaves are arranged alternately, lance-shaped to curved, the same glossy green on both sides, 80–300 mm (3.1–11.8 in) long and 15–40 mm (0.59–1.57 in) wide on a petiole 14–45 mm (0.55–1.77 in) wide. The flower buds are arranged in groups of seven in leaf axils on a flattened, unbranched peduncle 7–16 mm (0.28–0.63 in) long, the individual buds on a pedicel 2–6 mm (0.079–0.236 in) long. Mature buds are oval, 6–7 mm (0.24–0.28 in) long and 3–5 mm (0.12–0.20 in) wide with a beaked, conical or rounded operculum. The flowers are white and the fruit is a woody cup-shaped, conical or hemispherical capsule 4–6 mm (0.16–0.24 in) long and 5–9 mm (0.20–0.35 in) wide with the valves reaching past the level of the rim.

== Taxonomy and naming ==
Eucalyptus dunnii was first described in 1905 by Joseph Maiden in Proceedings of the Linnean Society of New South Wales from a specimen collected by William Dunn at "Acacia Creek, Macpherson Range". The specific epithet (dunnii) honours the collector of the type specimen.

== Distribution and habitat ==
Dunn's white gum has a scattered and restricted distribution in wet forest north from Dorrigo and Coffs Harbour in New South Wales to Warwick and Canungra in Queensland.
