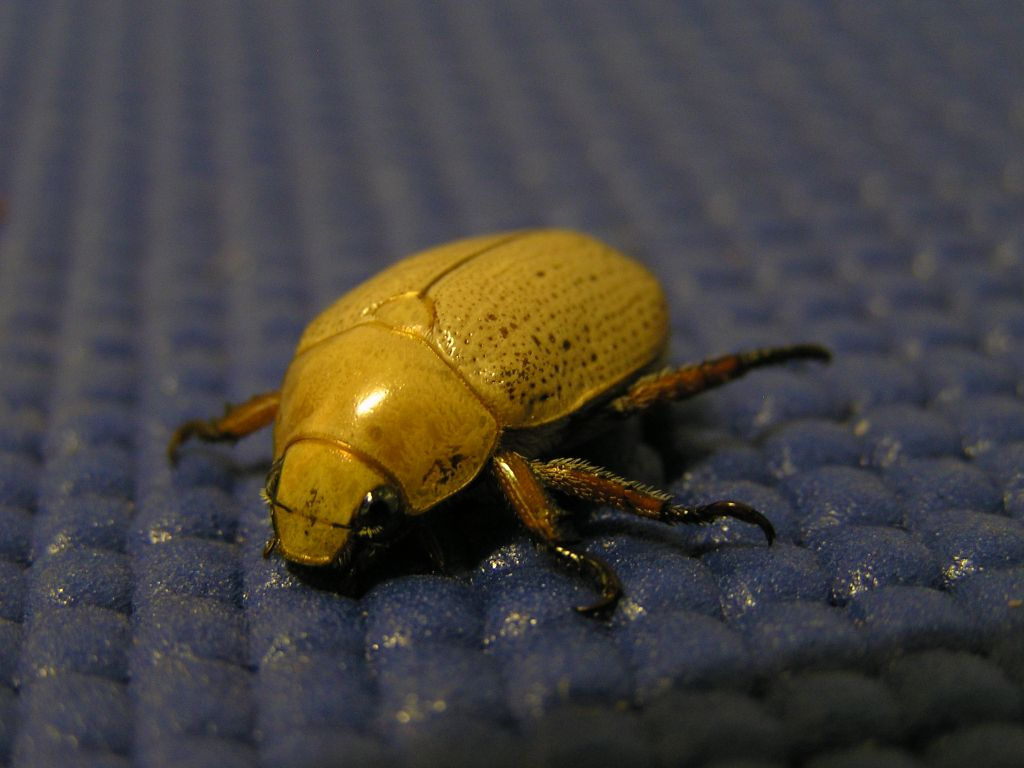
- Anoplognathus pallidicollis

Scientific classification
- Kingdom: Animalia
- Phylum: Arthropoda
- Clade: Pancrustacea
- Class: Insecta
- Order: Coleoptera
- Suborder: Polyphaga
- Infraorder: Scarabaeiformia
- Family: Scarabaeidae
- Tribe: Anoplognathini
- Genus: Anoplognathus; Leach, 1819

Species
- See text

Synonyms
- Paranonca Laporte, 1840

= Christmas beetle =

Genus of beetles

Christmas beetle is a name commonly applied to the Australian beetle genus Anoplognathus, which belongs to the subfamily Rutelinae. They are known as Christmas beetles because they are abundant in both urban and rural areas close to Christmas. Christmas beetles are large (20–30 mm long) members of the scarab family that are noisy and clumsy fliers, similar to the cockchafers of Europe. They typically have elytra that are dark or light brown, or green, while some species have a green-yellow iridescence.

The genus includes 35 species, several of which have been implicated in dieback of eucalypts. Anoplognathus pallidicollis is the species most commonly observed and associated with the name of Christmas beetle. However, there is a tendency for the name Christmas beetle to be used more ambiguously to refer to other metallic beetles not in this family, such as the stag beetle genus Lamprima. The smaller Argentine lawn beetle, Cyclocephala signaticollis, is prevalent in December and may also be referred to as a "Christmas beetle", labelled by the Australian Museum as an "impostor".

== Species ==
- Anoplognathus abnormis MacLeay, 1873
- Anoplognathus aeneus Waterhouse, 1868
- Anoplognathus aureus Waterhouse, 1889
- Anoplognathus aurora Arrow, 1919
- Anoplognathus blackdownensis Carne, 1981
- Anoplognathus boisduvalii Boisduval, 1835
- Anoplognathus brevicollis Blackburn, 1892
- Anoplognathus brunnipennis (Gyllenhal, 1817)
- Anoplognathus concolor Burmeister, 1855
- Anoplognathus daemeli Ohaus, 1898
- Anoplognathus debaari Allsopp, 2010
- Anoplognathus explanatus Arrow, 1901
- Anoplognathus flavipennis Boisduval, 1835
- Anoplognathus flindersensis Carne, 1981
- Anoplognathus hilleri Allsopp, 1990
- Anoplognathus macalpinei Carne, 1981
- Anoplognathus macleayi Blackburn, 1892
- Anoplognathus montanus MacLeay, 1873
- Anoplognathus multiseriatus Lea, 1919
- Anoplognathus nebulosus MacLeay, 1864
- Anoplognathus olivieri (Schönherr & Dalman, 1817)
- Anoplognathus pallidicollis Blanchard, 1851
- Anoplognathus parvulus Waterhouse, 1873
- Anoplognathus pindarus Carne, 1957
- Anoplognathus porosus (Dalman, 1817)
- Anoplognathus prasinus (Laporte, 1840)
- Anoplognathus punctulatus Olliff, 1890
- Anoplognathus rhinastus Blanchard, 1851
- Anoplognathus rothschildi Ohaus, 1898
- Anoplognathus rubiginosus MacLeay, 1873
- Anoplognathus rugosus Kirby, 1818
- Anoplognathus smaragdinus Ohaus, 1904
- Anoplognathus storeyi Allsopp, 2010
- Anoplognathus suturalis Boisduval, 1835
- Anoplognathus velutinus Boisduval, 1835
- Anoplognathus vietor Allsopp & Carne, 1986
- Anoplognathus viridiaeneus (Donovan, 1805)
- Anoplognathus viriditarsis (Leach, 1815)

== Selected former species ==
- Anoplognathus chloropyrus
- Anoplognathus hirsutus
- Anoplognathus narmarus
