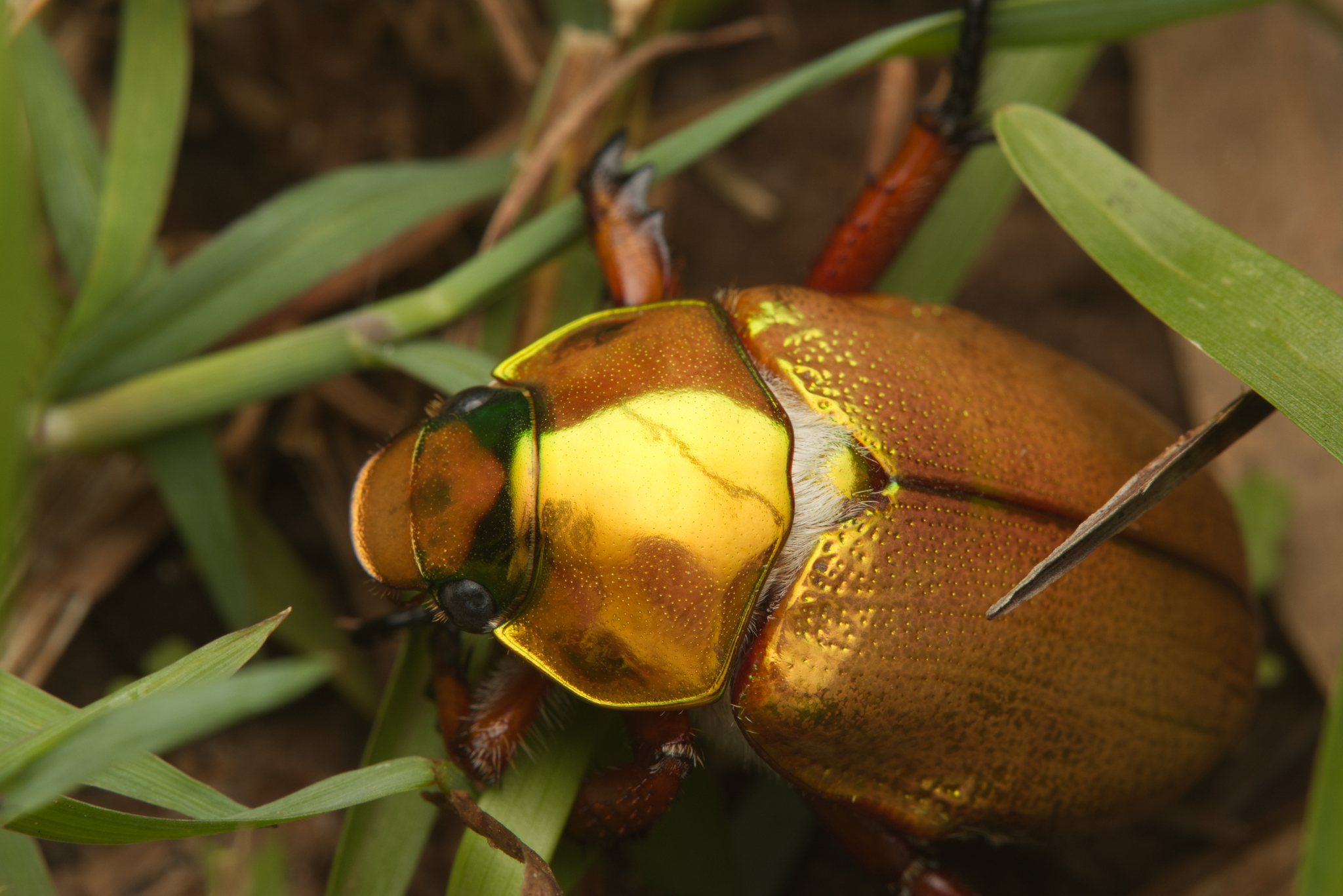

Scientific classification
- Domain: Eukaryota
- Kingdom: Animalia
- Phylum: Arthropoda
- Class: Insecta
- Order: Coleoptera
- Suborder: Polyphaga
- Infraorder: Scarabaeiformia
- Family: Scarabaeidae
- Genus: Anoplognathus
- Species: A. viridiaeneus

Binomial name
- Anoplognathus viridiaeneus (Donovan, 1805)

Synonyms
- Rutela caesarea Billberg, 1817; Rutela latreillei Gyllenhal, 1817

= Anoplognathus viridiaeneus =

Species of beetle

Anoplognathus viridiaeneus, commonly known as the king Christmas beetle, is a beetle of the family Scarabaeidae native to eastern Australia. The largest Christmas beetle, it can be over 3 centimetres (1.2 in) long.

== Taxonomy ==
Edward Donovan described the King Christmas beetle in 1805 as Melolontha viridi-ænea, writing, "Nature seems to have devoted abundant attention to the embellishment of this common insect: its glow of colouring is peculiar and inimitable. The prevailing hues do not strictly please us by their harmony as their contrast, which is indeed striking, or rather glaring, but upon the whole produce a rich effect", describing it as "testaceous" (red-brown) overlain with translucent green and a brassy-gold sheen in light. Its specific epithet is derived from the Latin words viridis "green" and aeneus "copper/bronze".

The King Christmas beetle was described in 1817 as Rutela caesarea by Gustaf Johan Billberg and R. latreillei by Leonard Gyllenhaal.

When Leach erected the genus Anoplognathus in 1815, he did not assign a type species. Phil Carne designated A. viridiaeneus as the type in 1957.

== Description ==
The largest Christmas beetle, the adult male is 30–32 mm long and 16–19 mm wide at its broadest, while the female is 28–34 mm long and 16-19.5 mm wide. It is predominantly red-brown with gold-green overtone. The head has rose highlights, while the pronotum, scutellum and elytra have a gold sheen. The pygidium, coxae, and abdomen are a bright green, while the legs are red-brown, and tarsi are black. The female has flatter elytra than the male.

== Distribution ==
This species is present in eastern Australia (New South Wales and Queensland). Once common around Sydney, it has all but vanished due to loss of habitat.

== Ecology ==
The larvae feed on rotting wood, humus and grass roots.

The King Christmas beetle has been recorded on the turpentine tree (Syncarpia glomulifera) of the family Myrtaceae.
