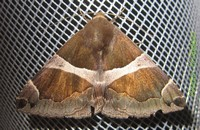

Scientific classification
- Domain: Eukaryota
- Kingdom: Animalia
- Phylum: Arthropoda
- Class: Insecta
- Order: Lepidoptera
- Superfamily: Noctuoidea
- Family: Erebidae
- Tribe: Ophiusini
- Genus: Dysgonia; Hübner, [1823]

= Dysgonia =

Genus of moths

Dysgonia is a genus of moths in the family Erebidae. The genus was erected by Jacob Hübner in 1823.

== Taxonomy ==
Many species formerly in the genus were moved to other genera, such as Bastilla, Buzara, Pindara and Macaldenia by Jeremy Daniel Holloway and Scott E. Miller in 2003. Other former members of Dysgonia were moved to the genus Parallelia.

== Species ==
- Dysgonia algira (Linnaeus, 1767) – passenger
- Dysgonia calefasciens (Walker, 1858)
- Dysgonia conficiens (Walker, 1858)
- Dysgonia constricta (Butler, 1874)
- Dysgonia coreana (Leech, 1889)
- Dysgonia correctana (Walker, 1865)
- Dysgonia dulcis (Butler, 1878)
- Dysgonia duplexa (Moore, 1883)
- Dysgonia hercodes (Meyrick, 1902)
- Dysgonia hicanora (Turner, 1903)
- Dysgonia interpersa (Guenée, 1852)
- Dysgonia latifasciata Warren, 1888
- Dysgonia mandschuriana (Staudinger, 1892)
- Dysgonia monogona (Lower, 1903)
- Dysgonia obscura (Bremer & Grey, 1853)
- Dysgonia orbata Berio, 1955
- Dysgonia properata (Walker, 1858)
- Dysgonia renalis (Hampson, 1894)
- Dysgonia rigidistria (Guenée, 1852)
- Dysgonia rogenhoferi (Bohatsch, 1880)
- Dysgonia senex (Walker, 1858)
- Dysgonia stuposa (Fabricius, 1794)
- Dysgonia torrida (Guenée, 1852)
- Dysgonia uvarovi (Wiltshire, 1949)
- Dysgonia valga (Prout, 1919)

=== Species of which placement in Dysgonia is uncertain ===
- Dysgonia abnegans (Walker, 1858)
- Dysgonia adunca (L. B. Prout,} 1919)
- Dysgonia albilinea Hampson, 1918)
- Dysgonia albocincta (Walker, 1865)
- Dysgonia analamerana (Griveaud, 1981)
- Dysgonia anetica (Felder and Rogenhofer, 1874)
- Dysgonia ankalirano Viette, 1982
- Dysgonia arcifera (Druce, 1912)
- Dysgonia aviceps (Warren, 1915)
- Dysgonia banian (Griveaud, 1981)
- Dysgonia berioi Viette, 1968
- Dysgonia chiliensis (Guenée, 1852)
- Dysgonia conjunctura (Walker, 1858)
- Dysgonia conspicua (Warren, 1915)
- Dysgonia curvilimes (Warren, 1915)
- Dysgonia delphinensis (Viette, 1968)
- Dysgonia diffusa (A. E. Prout, 1921)
- Dysgonia diplocyma (Gaede, 1917)
- Dysgonia eclipsifera (Hampson, 1918)
- Dysgonia erectata (Hampson, 1902)
- Dysgonia expediens (Walker, 1858)
- Dysgonia fallax (Hulstaert, 1924) (syn: Dysgonia septentrionis (Hulstaert, 1924))
- Dysgonia fruhstorferi Swinhoe, 1918
- Dysgonia galphyra (A. E. Prout, 1927)
- Dysgonia goniophora (Hampson, 1910) (syn: Dysgonia diamesa (A. E. Prout, 1927))
- Dysgonia humilis Holland, 1894
- Dysgonia insignifica (Bethune-Baker, 1906)
- Dysgonia iotrigona (Zerny, 1916)
- Dysgonia irregulata (Berio, 1956)
- Dysgonia isotima (L. B. Prout, 1919)
- Dysgonia latifascia Warren, 1888
- Dysgonia laurentensis (Viette, 1968)
- Dysgonia leucogramma (Hampson, 1913)
- Dysgonia lilacea (Bethune-Baker, 1906)
- Dysgonia macrorhyncha (Hampson, 1913)
- Dysgonia malgassica (Viette, 1968)
- Dysgonia manillana Swinhoe, 1918
- Dysgonia masama (Griveaud, 1981)
- Dysgonia mesonephele (Hampson, 1910)
- Dysgonia multilineata (Holland, 1894)
- Dysgonia muza (Strand, 1919)
- Dysgonia nesites (A. E. Prout, 1927)
- Dysgonia orodes (Cramer, 1777)) (syn: Dysgonia perfinita (Möschler, 1880))
- Dysgonia pauliani (Viette, 1981)
- Dysgonia pentagonalis (Viette, 1981)
- Dysgonia perexcurvata (Hampson, 1918)
- Dysgonia porphyrescens (Hampson, 1910)
- Dysgonia portia (Fawcett, 1915)
- Dysgonia postica (Wileman and South, 1918)
- Dysgonia prorasigna (Hampson, 1913)
- Dysgonia pudica (Möschler, 1888)
- Dysgonia purpurata Kaye, 1901
- Dysgonia rectifascia (Fawcett, 1915)
- Dysgonia rectivia (Hampson, 1913)
- Dysgonia renalis (Hampson, 1894)
- Dysgonia semilunaria (Hampson, 1918)
- Dysgonia subangularis (Mabille, 1890)
- Dysgonia swinhoei (Semper, 1900)
- Dysgonia triplocyma (Hampson, 1913)
- Dysgonia trogosema (Hampson, 1913)

=== Former species ===
- Dysgonia absentimacula is now Bastilla absentimacula (Guenée, 1852)
- Dysgonia acuta is now Bastilla acuta (Moore, 1883)
- Dysgonia amygdalis is now Bastilla amygdalis (Moore, 1885)
- Dysgonia analis is now Bastilla analis (Guenée, 1852)
- Dysgonia arcuata is now Bastilla arcuata (Moore, 1877)
- Dysgonia arctotaenia is now Bastilla arctotaenia (Guenée, 1852)
- Dysgonia axiniphora is now Bastilla axiniphora (Hampson, 1913)
- Dysgonia circumsignata is now Bastilla circumsignata (Guenée, 1852)
- Dysgonia consobrina is now Neadysgonia consobrina (Guenée, 1852)
- Dysgonia copidiphora is now Bastilla copidiphora (Hampson, 1913)
- Dysgonia crameri is now Bastilla crameri (Moore, 1885)
- Dysgonia dicoela is now Bastilla dicoela (Turner, 1909)
- Dysgonia frontinus is now Buzara frontinus (Donovan, 1805)
- Dysgonia fulvotaenia is now Bastilla fulvotaenia (Guenée, 1852)
- Dysgonia hamatilis is now Bastilla hamatilis (Guenée, 1852)
- Dysgonia illibata is now Pindara illibata (Fabricius, 1775)
- Dysgonia infractafinis is now Buzara infractafinis (Lucas, 1895)
- Dysgonia joviana is now Bastilla joviana (Stoll, 1782)
- Dysgonia latizona is now Buzara latizona (Butler, 1874)
- Dysgonia maturata is now Bastilla maturata (Walker, 1858)
- Dysgonia maturescens is now Bastilla maturescens (Walker, 1858)
- Dysgonia onelia is now Buzara onelia (Guenée, 1852)
- Dysgonia palumba is now Macaldenia palumba (Guenée, 1852)
- Dysgonia praetermissa is now Bastilla praetermissa (Warren, 1913)
- Dysgonia propyrrha is now Buzara propyrrha (Walker, 1858)
- Dysgonia solomonensis is now Bastilla solomonensis (Hampson, 1913)
- Dysgonia serratilinea is now Pindara serratilinea (Bethune-Baker, 1906)
- Dysgonia similis is now Neadysgonia similis (Guenée, 1852)
- Dysgonia simillima is now Bastilla simillima (Guenée, 1852)
- Dysgonia smithii is now Neadysgonia smithii (Guenée, 1852)
- Dysgonia umbrosa is now Buzara umbrosa (Walker, 1865)
