= Dysgonia rigidistria =

Scientific classification
- Kingdom: Animalia
- Phylum: Arthropoda
- Clade: Pancrustacea
- Class: Insecta
- Order: Lepidoptera
- Superfamily: Noctuoidea
- Family: Erebidae
- Genus: Dysgonia
- Species: D. rigidistria

Binomial name
- Dysgonia rigidistria (Guenée, 1852)

Synonyms
- Parallelia rigidistria (Guenée, 1852)

Species of moth

Dysgonia rigidistria is a moth of the family Noctuidae first described by Achille Guenée in 1852. It is found on the Indian peninsula and Sri Lanka.

== Taxonomy ==
Dysgonia calefasciens (Walker, 1858) and Dysgonia correctana (Walker, 1865) are no longer considered synonyms of Dysgonia rigidistria.

== Description ==
Its wingspan is about 56 mm. It is a bronze-brown moth. Forewings with a white speck found in the cell. There is an erect straight medial whitish band with a dark line on its outer edge. An indistinct dark waved sub-marginal line and a marginal black specks series can be seen. Abdomen and hindwings are fuscous, where there are traces of medial and sub-marginal pale lines on hindwings. A marginal black speck series present. Ventral side with two waved postmedial line to each wing.
