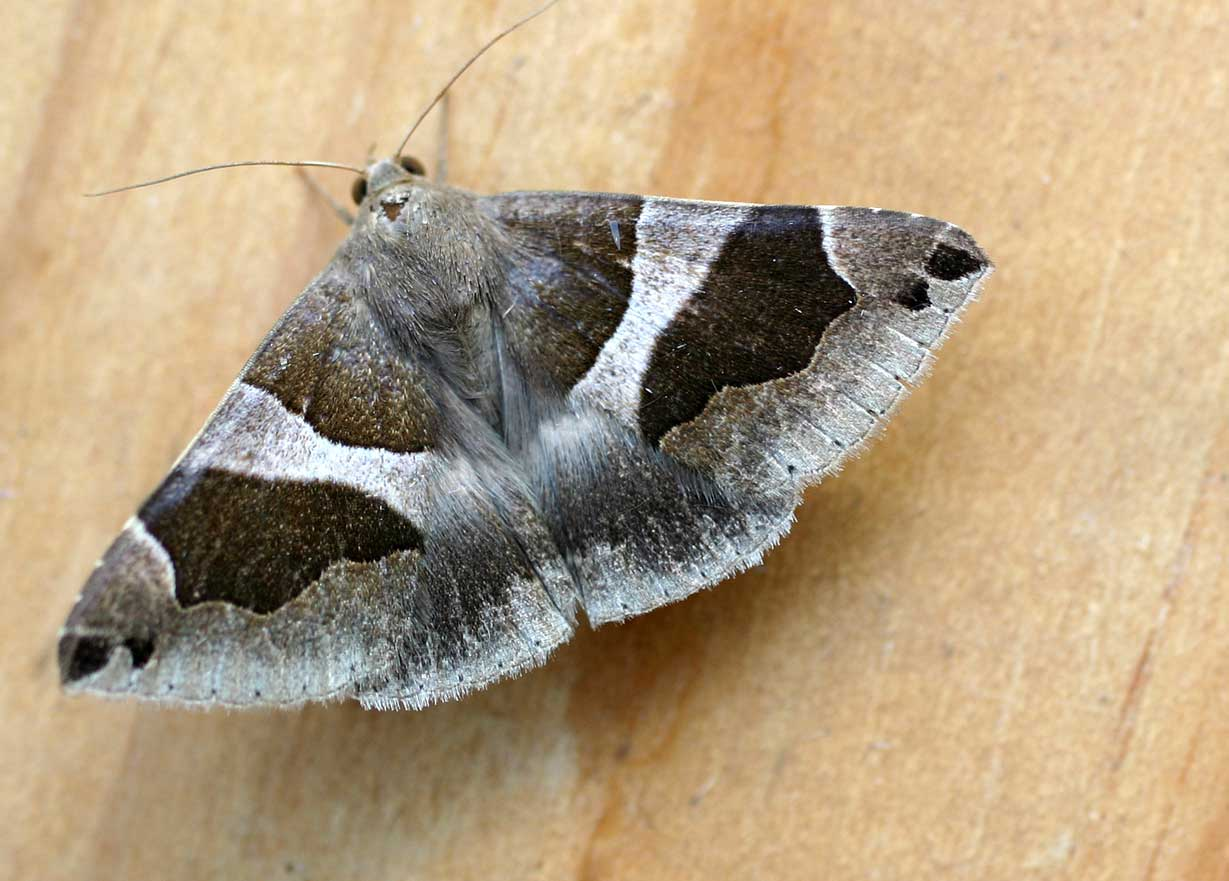

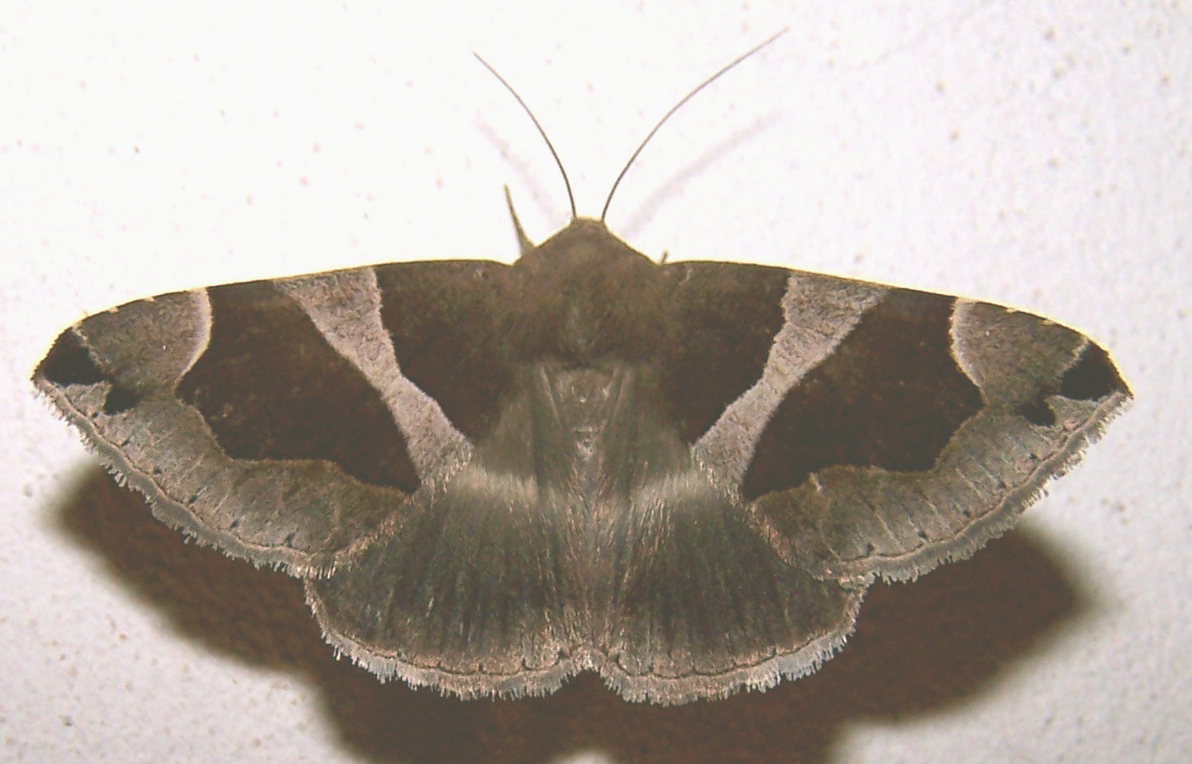

Scientific classification
- Kingdom: Animalia
- Phylum: Arthropoda
- Class: Insecta
- Order: Lepidoptera
- Superfamily: Noctuoidea
- Family: Erebidae
- Genus: Dysgonia
- Species: D. algira

Binomial name
- Dysgonia algira (Linnaeus, 1767)

Synonyms
- List: Phalaena algira Linnaeus, 1767; Noctua triangularis Hübner, [1803]; Ophiusa albivitta Guenée, 1852; Ophiusa festina Walker, 1858; Ophiusa olympia Swinhoe, 1885; Grammodes algira var. europa Schawerda, 1912; Grammodes algira f. defecta Stauder, 1923; Parallelia algira sinica Bryk, 1949; Dysgonia achatina Sulzer, 1776; Dysgonia defecta (Stauder, 1923)

= Dysgonia algira =

Passenger

Species of moth

Dysgonia algira, the passenger, is a moth of the family Noctuidae. The species was first described by Carl Linnaeus in 1767 and is found in the Palearctic - from the southern half of Europe and parts of North Africa through West, Central and South Asia.

== Technical description and variation ==
O. algira L. (= achatina Sulz., triangularis Hbn) Forewing brownish fuscous, with a purplish tinge when fresh; a whitish median band narrowed in middle, edged inwardly by the erect but slightly outcurved inner line, outwardly by the similarly incurved median line: outer line acutely angled outwards on vein 6 and bluntly bent between veins 3 and 4. then sinuous to inner margin near median line; a black apical streak of two spots; the terminal area violet grey: hindwing fuscous, with a diffuse whitish median band: the terminal area grey at middle: fringe grey, below apex whitish; the ab. mandschuriana Stgr.[ now full species Dysgonia mandschuriana (Staudinger, 1892) ] is more uniformly purplish or slaty grey, with the median band only slightly paler, not white. Larva yellowish grey, darker on dorsum, with tine black longitudinal lines; venter and feet pale grey; spiracles black; head yellowish grey. The wingspan is 40–46 mm.

== Biology ==
The moth flies from May to August depending on the location. The larvae feed on Rubus and willow.
