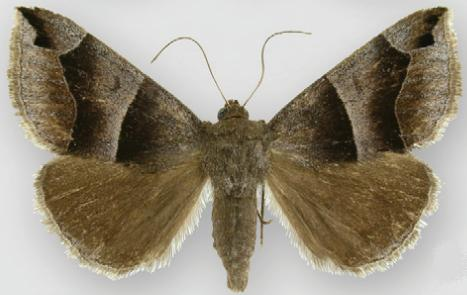
- Gondysia consobrina

Scientific classification
- Kingdom: Animalia
- Phylum: Arthropoda
- Class: Insecta
- Order: Lepidoptera
- Superfamily: Noctuoidea
- Family: Erebidae
- Tribe: Poaphilini
- Genus: Gondysia; Berio, 1955

Synonyms
- Neadysgonia Sullivan, 2010

= Gondysia =

Genus of moths

Gondysia is a genus of moths in the family Erebidae.

== Taxonomy ==
Neadysgonia was proposed, revised, and removed from the Old World genus Dysgonia by Sullivan in 2010 and was later placed as a synonym of Gondysia.

== Species ==
- Gondysia consobrina (Guenée, 1852)
- Gondysia similis (Guenée, 1852)
- Gondysia smithii (Guenée, 1852)
- Gondysia telma Sullivan, 2010
