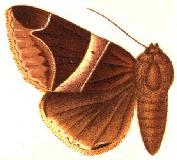

Scientific classification
- Kingdom: Animalia
- Phylum: Arthropoda
- Class: Insecta
- Order: Lepidoptera
- Superfamily: Noctuoidea
- Family: Erebidae
- Genus: Dysgonia
- Species: D. expediens

Binomial name
- Dysgonia expediens (Walker, 1858)

Synonyms
- Bastilla expediens (Walker, 1858); Parallelia expediens (Walker, 1858); Ophiusa expediens Walker, 1858

= Dysgonia expediens =

Species of moth

Dysgonia expediens is a moth of the family Noctuidae first described by Francis Walker in 1858. It is found in South America, including Brazil.
