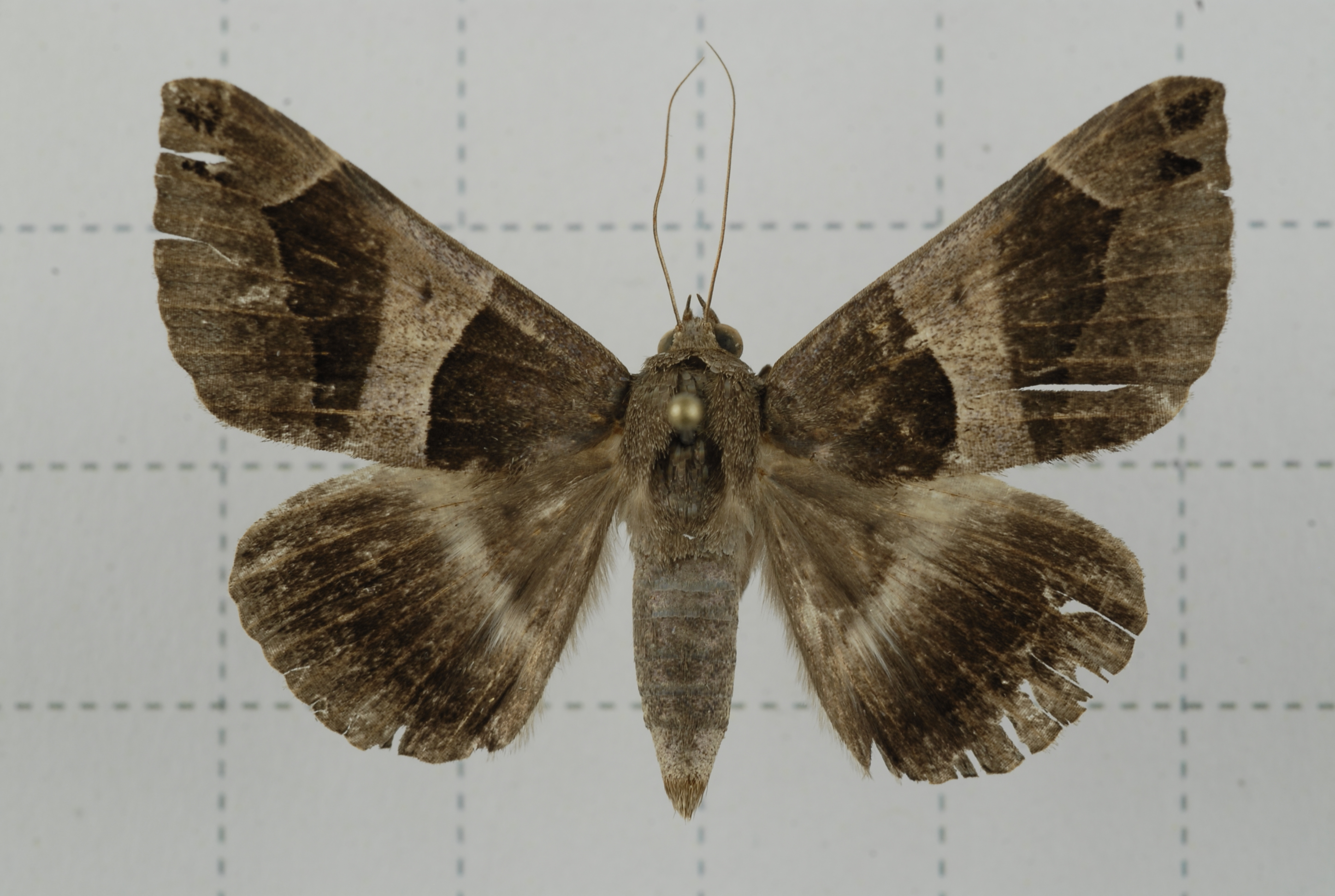

Scientific classification
- Kingdom: Animalia
- Phylum: Arthropoda
- Class: Insecta
- Order: Lepidoptera
- Superfamily: Noctuoidea
- Family: Erebidae
- Genus: Dysgonia
- Species: D. stuposa

Binomial name
- Dysgonia stuposa (Fabricius, 1794)

Synonyms
- Noctua stuposa Fabricius, 1794; Dysgonia festinata (Walker, 1858); Dysgonia tumefacta (Warren, 1913); Dysgonia japonibia Bryk, 1949

= Dysgonia stuposa =

Species of moth

Dysgonia stuposa is a moth of the family Erebidae first described by Johan Christian Fabricius in 1794. It is found in Korea, Cambodia, China, India, Indonesia (Sumatra and Timor), Japan (Honshu, Shikoku, Kyushu, Ryukyu Islands), Nepal, the Philippines, the Russian Far East (the Primorye region), Sri Lanka, Taiwan and Vietnam.

The wingspan is 45–49 mm.
