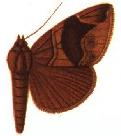

Scientific classification
- Kingdom: Animalia
- Phylum: Arthropoda
- Class: Insecta
- Order: Lepidoptera
- Superfamily: Noctuoidea
- Family: Erebidae
- Genus: Dysgonia
- Species: D. arcifera

Binomial name
- Dysgonia arcifera (H. Druce, 1912)

Synonyms
- Parallelia arcifera H. Druce, 1912

= Dysgonia arcifera =

Species of moth

Dysgonia arcifera is a moth of the family Noctuidae first described by Herbert Druce in 1912. It is found in western Africa.
