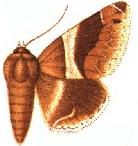

Scientific classification
- Kingdom: Animalia
- Phylum: Arthropoda
- Class: Insecta
- Order: Lepidoptera
- Superfamily: Noctuoidea
- Family: Erebidae
- Genus: Dysgonia
- Species: D. constricta

Binomial name
- Dysgonia constricta (Butler, 1874)

Synonyms
- Ophiusa constricta Butler, 1874; Parallelia constricta (Butler, 1874); Catocala albofasciata Scott, 1891; Grammodes divaricata Lucas, 1892; Parallelia divaricata (Lucas, 1892); Dysgonia divaricata (Lucas, 1892); Dysgonia albofasciata (Scott, 1891)

= Dysgonia constricta =

Species of moth

Dysgonia constricta is a moth of the family Erebidae first described by Arthur Gardiner Butler in 1874. It is found in New Guinea and the Australian states of New South Wales and Queensland.

The larvae feed on Elaeocarpus obovatus.
