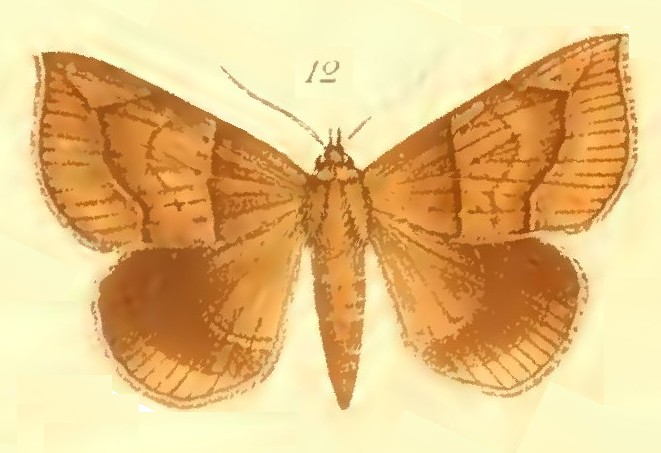

Scientific classification
- Kingdom: Animalia
- Phylum: Arthropoda
- Class: Insecta
- Order: Lepidoptera
- Superfamily: Noctuoidea
- Family: Erebidae
- Genus: Dysgonia
- Species: D. pudica

Binomial name
- Dysgonia pudica (Möschler, 1888)

Synonyms
- Ophiusa orthaea Mabille, 1890; Dysgonia orthaea (Mabille, 1890); Parallelia pudica Möschler, 1888

= Dysgonia pudica =

Species of moth

Dysgonia pudica is a moth of the family Noctuidae first described by Heinrich Benno Möschler in 1888. It is mainly found in Ghana and Ivory Coast.
