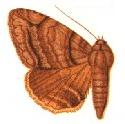

Scientific classification
- Kingdom: Animalia
- Phylum: Arthropoda
- Class: Insecta
- Order: Lepidoptera
- Superfamily: Noctuoidea
- Family: Erebidae
- Genus: Dysgonia
- Species: D. multilineata

Binomial name
- Dysgonia multilineata (Holland, 1894)

Synonyms
- Naxia multilineata Holland, 1894; Parallelia multilineata (Holland, 1894)

= Dysgonia multilineata =

Species of moth

Dysgonia multilineata is a moth of the family Noctuidae first described by William Jacob Holland in 1894. It is found in Africa, including Sierra Leone.
