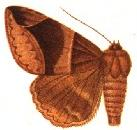

Scientific classification
- Kingdom: Animalia
- Phylum: Arthropoda
- Class: Insecta
- Order: Lepidoptera
- Superfamily: Noctuoidea
- Family: Erebidae
- Genus: Dysgonia
- Species: D. interpersa

Binomial name
- Dysgonia interpersa (Guenée, 1852)

Synonyms
- Ophiusa interpersa Guenée, 1852; Parallelia interpensa (Guenée, 1852)

= Dysgonia interpersa =

Species of moth

Dysgonia interpersa is a moth of the family Noctuidae first described by Achille Guenée in 1852. It is found in Indonesia.
