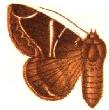

Scientific classification
- Kingdom: Animalia
- Phylum: Arthropoda
- Class: Insecta
- Order: Lepidoptera
- Superfamily: Noctuoidea
- Family: Erebidae
- Genus: Dysgonia
- Species: D. leucogramma

Binomial name
- Dysgonia leucogramma (Hampson, 1913)

Synonyms
- Parallelia leucogramma Hampson, 1913

= Dysgonia leucogramma =

Species of moth

Dysgonia leucogramma is a moth of the family Noctuidae first described by George Hampson in 1913. It is found in New Guinea.
