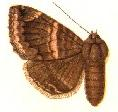

Scientific classification
- Kingdom: Animalia
- Phylum: Arthropoda
- Clade: Pancrustacea
- Class: Insecta
- Order: Lepidoptera
- Superfamily: Noctuoidea
- Family: Erebidae
- Genus: Buzara
- Species: B. lageos

Binomial name
- Buzara lageos (Guenée, 1852)

Synonyms
- Parallelia lageos (Guenée, 1852); Naxia lageos Guenée, 1852; Dysgonia lageos (Guenée, 1852)

= Buzara lageos =

Species of moth

Buzara lageos is a moth of the family Erebidae. It is found in Indonesia.
