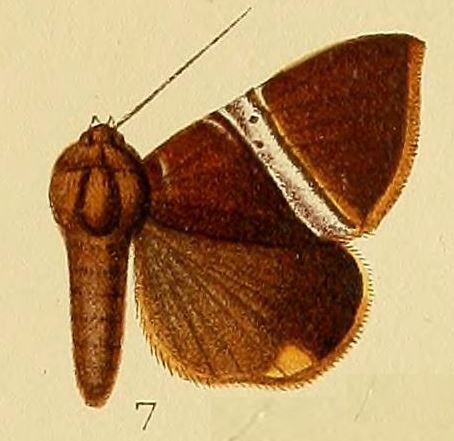

Scientific classification
- Kingdom: Animalia
- Phylum: Arthropoda
- Class: Insecta
- Order: Lepidoptera
- Superfamily: Noctuoidea
- Family: Erebidae
- Genus: Dysgonia
- Species: D. rectivia

Binomial name
- Dysgonia rectivia (Hampson, 1913)

Synonyms
- Parallelia rectivia Hampson, 1913

= Dysgonia rectivia =

Species of moth

Dysgonia rectivia is a moth of the family Erebidae.

== Distribution ==
It is known from Ghana and Congo.
