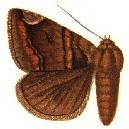

Scientific classification
- Kingdom: Animalia
- Phylum: Arthropoda
- Clade: Pancrustacea
- Class: Insecta
- Order: Lepidoptera
- Superfamily: Noctuoidea
- Family: Erebidae
- Genus: Buzara
- Species: B. feneratrix

Binomial name
- Buzara feneratrix (Guenée, 1852)

Synonyms
- Bastilla feneratrix (Guenee, 1852); Naxia feneratrix Guenee, 1852; Dysgonia feneratrix (Guenee, 1852); Parallelia feneratrix melanochrous Rothschild, 1920; Parallelia feneratrix Guenée; Holloway, 1976

= Buzara feneratrix =

Species of moth

Buzara feneratrix is a moth of the family Erebidae. It is found in Sundaland and Thailand.
