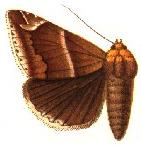
- Buzara propyrrha

Scientific classification
- Kingdom: Animalia
- Phylum: Arthropoda
- Class: Insecta
- Order: Lepidoptera
- Superfamily: Noctuoidea
- Family: Erebidae
- Tribe: Ophiusini
- Genus: Buzara; Walker, 1865

Species
- See text

= Buzara =

Genus of moths

Buzara is a genus of moths in the family Erebidae.

== Taxonomy ==
Several species now in the genus where formerly placed in the genus Dysgonia.

== Species ==
The genus includes the following species:

- Buzara chrysomela Walker, 1864 (syn: Buzara eurychrysa (Meyrick, 1889), Buzara gestroi Oberthuer, 1880)
- Buzara circumducta Warren, 1912
- Buzara feneratrix (Guenée, 1852)
- Buzara forceps (Kobes, 1985)
- Buzara frontinus (Donovan, 1805)
- Buzara infractafinis (Lucas, 1894)
- Buzara lageos (Guenée, 1852)
- Buzara latizona (Butler, 1874)
- Buzara lua (Strand, 1816)
- Buzara luteipalpis (Walker)
- Buzara onelia (Guenée, 1852)
- Buzara propyrrha (Walker, 1858)
- Buzara roulera (Swinhoe, 1909)
- Buzara pseudoumbrosa
- Buzara saikehi
- Buzara umbrosa (Walker, 1865)
