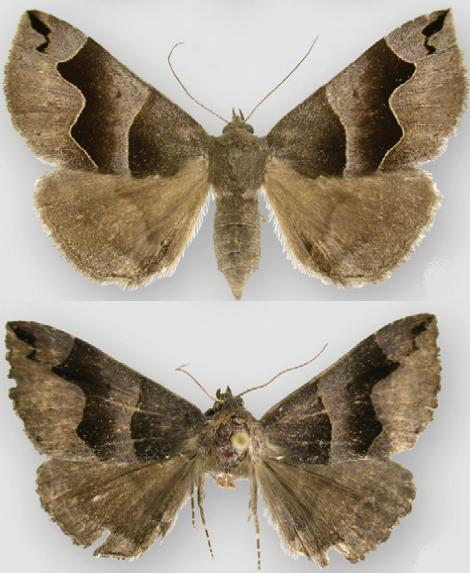
- Female (top) and male

Scientific classification
- Domain: Eukaryota
- Kingdom: Animalia
- Phylum: Arthropoda
- Class: Insecta
- Order: Lepidoptera
- Superfamily: Noctuoidea
- Family: Erebidae
- Genus: Gondysia
- Species: G. telma

Binomial name
- Gondysia telma (Sullivan, 2010)

Synonyms
- Neadysgonia telma Sullivan, 2010

= Gondysia telma =

Species of moth

Gondysia telma is a moth of the family Noctuidae first described by Sullivan in 2010. It is found in the United States, from North Carolina southward at least to the Florida Panhandle and central Florida and westward to Texas, with one record farther north from Indiana.

It occurs in swamp forests where there is standing water. In this habitat red maples tend to dominate emergent forests whereas mature forests are more mixed with cypress often the dominant large tree.

The length of the forewings is 19–20 mm. There are multiple brooded throughout its range with adults on wing from April through September.

== Etymology ==
The Greek word telma refers to standing water. Specimens from North Carolina and Florida are associated with hydric forests in the Coastal Plain.
