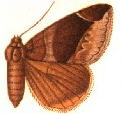

Scientific classification
- Kingdom: Animalia
- Phylum: Arthropoda
- Class: Insecta
- Order: Lepidoptera
- Superfamily: Noctuoidea
- Family: Erebidae
- Genus: Dysgonia
- Species: D. conjunctura

Binomial name
- Dysgonia conjunctura (Walker, 1858)

Synonyms
- Parallelia conjunctura Walker, 1858; Dysgonia neptunia Holland, 1894

= Dysgonia conjunctura =

Species of moth

Dysgonia conjunctura is a moth of the family Noctuidae first described by Francis Walker in 1858. It is found in Africa, including Príncipe, South Africa, Gabon and Kenya.
