= Dysgonia coreana =

Scientific classification
- Kingdom: Animalia
- Phylum: Arthropoda
- Class: Insecta
- Order: Lepidoptera
- Superfamily: Noctuoidea
- Family: Erebidae
- Genus: Dysgonia
- Species: D. coreana

Binomial name
- Dysgonia coreana (Leech, 1889)

Synonyms
- Naxia coreana Leech 1889

Species of moth

Dysgonia coreana is a moth of the family Noctuidae first described by John Henry Leech in 1889. It is found in Korea and the Russian Far East (the Primorye region).

Dysgonia coreana is treated as a synonym of Dysgonia obscura by some authors.
