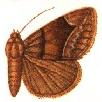

Scientific classification
- Kingdom: Animalia
- Phylum: Arthropoda
- Class: Insecta
- Order: Lepidoptera
- Superfamily: Noctuoidea
- Family: Erebidae
- Genus: Dysgonia
- Species: D. humilis

Binomial name
- Dysgonia humilis Holland, 1894

Synonyms
- Parallelia humilis (Holland, 1894)

= Dysgonia humilis =

Species of moth

Dysgonia humilis is a moth of the family Noctuidae first described by William Jacob Holland in 1894. It is found in Africa, including Príncipe and Gabon.
