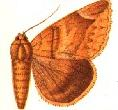

Scientific classification
- Kingdom: Animalia
- Phylum: Arthropoda
- Class: Insecta
- Order: Lepidoptera
- Superfamily: Noctuoidea
- Family: Erebidae
- Genus: Dysgonia
- Species: D. renalis

Binomial name
- Dysgonia renalis (Hampson, 1894)

Synonyms
- Parallelia renalis (Hampson, 1894)

= Dysgonia renalis =

Species of moth

Dysgonia renalis is a moth of the family Noctuidae first described by George Hampson in 1894. It is found in India.
