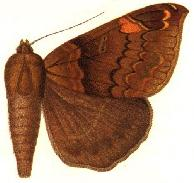

Scientific classification
- Kingdom: Animalia
- Phylum: Arthropoda
- Class: Insecta
- Order: Lepidoptera
- Superfamily: Noctuoidea
- Family: Noctuidae
- Genus: Pindara
- Species: P. prisca

Binomial name
- Pindara prisca (Walker, 1858)

Synonyms
- Ophisma prisca Walker, 1858; Parallelia prisca (Walker, 1858); Dysgonia prisca (Walker, 1858)

= Pindara prisca =

Species of moth

Pindara prisca is a moth of the family Noctuidae first described by Francis Walker in 1858. It is found from Vanuatu and New Caledonia to the southern Cook Islands.

The wingspan is 23–31 mm.

The larvae feed on Decaspermum species.
