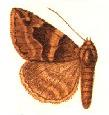

Scientific classification
- Kingdom: Animalia
- Phylum: Arthropoda
- Class: Insecta
- Order: Lepidoptera
- Superfamily: Noctuoidea
- Family: Erebidae
- Genus: Dysgonia
- Species: D. prorasigna

Binomial name
- Dysgonia prorasigna (Hampson, 1913)

Synonyms
- Parallelia prorasigna Hampson, 1913

= Dysgonia prorasigna =

Species of moth

Dysgonia prorasigna or Parallelia prorasigna is a moth of the family Erebidae. It was described by George Hampson in 1913. It is known from Uganda and the Democratic Republic of the Congo.
