= Dysgonia hercodes =

Scientific classification
- Kingdom: Animalia
- Phylum: Arthropoda
- Class: Insecta
- Order: Lepidoptera
- Superfamily: Noctuoidea
- Family: Erebidae
- Genus: Dysgonia
- Species: D. hercodes

Binomial name
- Dysgonia hercodes (Meyrick, 1902)

Synonyms
- Parallelia hercodes (Meyrick, 1902); Thyas hercodes Meyrick, 1902; Thyas crimnopasta Turner, 1909; Dysgonia crimnopasta (Turner, 1909)

Species of moth

Dysgonia hercodes is a moth of the family Noctuidae first described by Edward Meyrick in 1902. It is found in the Australian state of Queensland.
