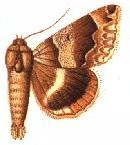

Scientific classification
- Kingdom: Animalia
- Phylum: Arthropoda
- Class: Insecta
- Order: Lepidoptera
- Superfamily: Noctuoidea
- Family: Erebidae
- Genus: Dysgonia
- Species: D. senex

Binomial name
- Dysgonia senex (Walker, 1858)

Synonyms
- Ophiusa senex Walker, 1858; Parallelia senex (Walker, 1858); Ophiusa acutissima Bethune-Baker, 1906; Dysgonia acutissima (Bethune-Baker, 1906); Parallelia medioobscura Strand, 1914; Dysgonia medioobscura (Strand, 1914)

= Dysgonia senex =

Species of moth

Dysgonia senex is a moth of the family Erebidae first described by Francis Walker in 1858. It is found in the Australian state of Queensland.

The wingspan is about 70 mm.
