= Dysgonia obscura =

Scientific classification
- Kingdom: Animalia
- Phylum: Arthropoda
- Class: Insecta
- Order: Lepidoptera
- Superfamily: Noctuoidea
- Family: Erebidae
- Genus: Dysgonia
- Species: D. obscura

Binomial name
- Dysgonia obscura (Bremer & Grey, 1853)

Synonyms
- Ophiusa obscura Bremer & Grey, 1853; Dysgonia hedemanni (Staudinger, 1888)

Species of moth

Dysgonia obscura is a moth of the family Noctuidae first described by Otto Vasilievich Bremer and William Grey in 1853. It is found in Korea, China and the Russian Far East (the Primorye region).

Some authors consider Dysgonia coreana to be a synonym of Dysgonia obscura.
