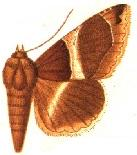

Scientific classification
- Kingdom: Animalia
- Phylum: Arthropoda
- Class: Insecta
- Order: Lepidoptera
- Superfamily: Noctuoidea
- Family: Erebidae
- Genus: Dysgonia
- Species: D. latifascia

Binomial name
- Dysgonia latifascia Warren, 1888

Synonyms
- Parallelia latifascia (Warren, 1888)

= Dysgonia latifascia =

Species of moth

Dysgonia latifascia is a moth of the family Noctuidae first described by Warren in 1888. It is found in India.
