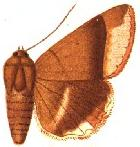

Scientific classification
- Kingdom: Animalia
- Phylum: Arthropoda
- Class: Insecta
- Order: Lepidoptera
- Superfamily: Noctuoidea
- Family: Erebidae
- Genus: Dysgonia
- Species: D. hicanora

Binomial name
- Dysgonia hicanora (Turner, 1903)

Synonyms
- Thyas hicanora Turner, 1903; Parallelia hicanora (Turner, 1903); Ophiusa vulgaris Bethune-Baker, 1906; Dysgonia vulgaris (Bethune-Baker, 1906)

= Dysgonia hicanora =

Species of moth

Dysgonia hicanora is a moth of the family Noctuidae first described by Alfred Jefferis Turner in 1903. It is found in New Guinea and Fiji.
