= Dysgonia rogenhoferi =

Scientific classification
- Kingdom: Animalia
- Phylum: Arthropoda
- Class: Insecta
- Order: Lepidoptera
- Superfamily: Noctuoidea
- Family: Erebidae
- Genus: Dysgonia
- Species: D. rogenhoferi

Binomial name
- Dysgonia rogenhoferi (Bohatsch, 1880)

Synonyms
- Grammodes rogenhoferi Bohatsch, 1880; Grammodes mirabilis (Romanoff, 1885); Grammodes triangulata (Swinhoe, 1889)

Species of moth

Dysgonia rogenhoferi is a moth of the family Noctuidae first described by Otto Bohatsch in 1880. It is found in Lebanon, Israel, Iraq, Arabia, Turkmenistan, northern Iran, Uzbekistan, the European part of southern Russia, Azerbaijan and Pakistan.

There is probably one generation per year. Adults are on wing from April to June.

The larvae feed on Tamarix species.
