= Dysgonia erectata =

Scientific classification
- Kingdom: Animalia
- Phylum: Arthropoda
- Class: Insecta
- Order: Lepidoptera
- Superfamily: Noctuoidea
- Family: Erebidae
- Genus: Dysgonia
- Species: D. erectata

Binomial name
- Dysgonia erectata (Hampson, 1902)

Synonyms
- Parallelia erectata (Hampson, 1902); Ophiusa erectata Hampson, 1902

Species of moth

Dysgonia erectata is a moth of the family Noctuidae first described by George Hampson in 1902. It is found in Africa, including Kenya, South Africa and Zambia.
