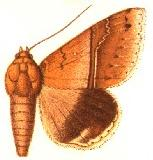

Scientific classification
- Kingdom: Animalia
- Phylum: Arthropoda
- Class: Insecta
- Order: Lepidoptera
- Superfamily: Noctuoidea
- Family: Erebidae
- Genus: Dysgonia
- Species: D. lilacea

Binomial name
- Dysgonia lilacea (Bethune-Baker, 1906)

Synonyms
- Ophiusa lilacea Bethune-Baker, 1906; Parallelia lilacea (Bethune-Baker, 1906)

= Dysgonia lilacea =

Species of moth

Dysgonia lilacea is a moth of the family Noctuidae first described by George Thomas Bethune-Baker in 1906. It is found in New Guinea.
