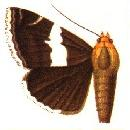

Scientific classification
- Kingdom: Animalia
- Phylum: Arthropoda
- Clade: Pancrustacea
- Class: Insecta
- Order: Lepidoptera
- Superfamily: Noctuoidea
- Family: Erebidae
- Genus: Buzara
- Species: B. roulera

Binomial name
- Buzara roulera (C. Swinhoe, 1909)

Synonyms
- Ophiusa roulera C. Swinhoe, 1909; Parallelia roulera (C. Swinhoe, 1909); Dysgonia roulera (C. Swinhoe, 1909)

= Buzara roulera =

Species of moth

Buzara roulera is a moth of the family Erebidae first described by Charles Swinhoe in 1909. It is found on Kai Island in Indonesia.
