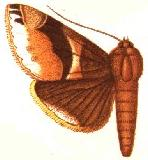

Scientific classification
- Kingdom: Animalia
- Phylum: Arthropoda
- Class: Insecta
- Order: Lepidoptera
- Superfamily: Noctuoidea
- Family: Erebidae
- Genus: Dysgonia
- Species: D. albocincta

Binomial name
- Dysgonia albocincta (Walker, 1865)

Synonyms
- Ophisma albocincta Walker, 1865; Parallelia albocincta (Walker, 1865)

= Dysgonia albocincta =

Species of moth

Dysgonia albocincta is a moth of the family Noctuidae first described by Francis Walker in 1865. It is found in Indonesia.
