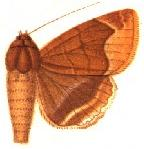

Scientific classification
- Kingdom: Animalia
- Phylum: Arthropoda
- Class: Insecta
- Order: Lepidoptera
- Superfamily: Noctuoidea
- Family: Erebidae
- Genus: Dysgonia
- Species: D. monogona

Binomial name
- Dysgonia monogona (Lower, 1903)

Synonyms
- Parallelia monogona (Lower, 1903); Ophiusa monogona Lower, 1903

= Dysgonia monogona =

Species of moth

Dysgonia monogona is a moth of the family Erebidae first described by Oswald Bertram Lower in 1903. It is found in the Australian state of Queensland.
