= Buzara forceps =

Scientific classification
- Kingdom: Animalia
- Phylum: Arthropoda
- Clade: Pancrustacea
- Class: Insecta
- Order: Lepidoptera
- Superfamily: Noctuoidea
- Family: Erebidae
- Genus: Buzara
- Species: B. forceps

Binomial name
- Buzara forceps (Kobes, 1985)

Synonyms
- Parallelia forceps Kobes, 1985; Dysgonia forceps (Kobes, 1985)

Species of moth

Buzara forceps is a moth of the family Erebidae. It is found in Sumatra and Borneo.
