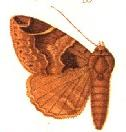

Scientific classification
- Kingdom: Animalia
- Phylum: Arthropoda
- Class: Insecta
- Order: Lepidoptera
- Superfamily: Noctuoidea
- Family: Erebidae
- Genus: Dysgonia
- Species: D. abnegans

Binomial name
- Dysgonia abnegans (Walker, 1858)

Synonyms
- Ophiusa abnegans Walker, 1858; Parallelia abnegans (Walker, 1858)

= Dysgonia abnegans =

Species of moth

Dysgonia abnegans is a moth of the family Noctuidae first described by Francis Walker in 1858. It is found in Africa, including Kenya and South Africa.
