= Dysgonia dulcis =

Scientific classification
- Kingdom: Animalia
- Phylum: Arthropoda
- Class: Insecta
- Order: Lepidoptera
- Superfamily: Noctuoidea
- Family: Erebidae
- Genus: Dysgonia
- Species: D. dulcis

Binomial name
- Dysgonia dulcis (Butler, 1878)

Synonyms
- Ophiusa dulcis Butler 1878; Parallelia dulcis (Butler, 1878)

Species of moth

Dysgonia dulcis is a moth of the family Noctuidae first described by Arthur Gardiner Butler in 1878. It is found in Korea, China, Japan (Honshu, Shikoku, Kyushu), the Russian Far East (the Primorye region) and Taiwan.
