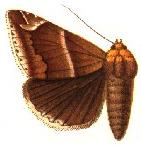

Scientific classification
- Kingdom: Animalia
- Phylum: Arthropoda
- Clade: Pancrustacea
- Class: Insecta
- Order: Lepidoptera
- Superfamily: Noctuoidea
- Family: Erebidae
- Genus: Buzara
- Species: B. propyrrha

Binomial name
- Buzara propyrrha (Walker, 1858)

Synonyms
- Naxia propyrrha Walker, 1858; Parallelia propyrrha (Walker, 1858); Dysgonia propyrrha (Walker, 1858)

= Buzara propyrrha =

Species of moth

Buzara propyrrha is a moth of the family Erebidae. It is found in Australia and Fiji.

The wingspan is about 40 mm.
