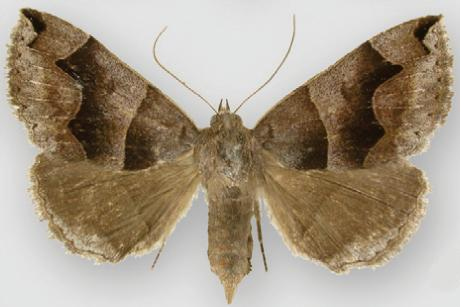

Scientific classification
- Kingdom: Animalia
- Phylum: Arthropoda
- Class: Insecta
- Order: Lepidoptera
- Superfamily: Noctuoidea
- Family: Erebidae
- Genus: Gondysia
- Species: G. smithii

Binomial name
- Gondysia smithii (Guenée, 1852)

Synonyms
- Ophiusa smithii Guenée in Boisduval and Guenée, 1852; Dysgonia smithii (Guenée, 1852); Neadysgonia smithii

= Gondysia smithii =

Species of moth

Gondysia smithii, or Smith's darkwing, is a moth of the family Noctuidae. The species was first described by Achille Guenée in 1852. It is found in the United States, from North Carolina southward to Georgia and westward to Texas northward in the Mississippi Valley to Missouri. It has recently been recorded from Virginia and Florida but not yet from Louisiana or Arkansas, although it does occur close by and would be expected in those states as well. It occurs in open savanna and mesic woodland habitats.

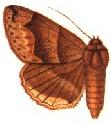
Illustration

The wingspan is 37–40 mm. Adults are on wing from April to September. There are multiple generations per year.
