= Dysgonia calefasciens =

Scientific classification
- Kingdom: Animalia
- Phylum: Arthropoda
- Class: Insecta
- Order: Lepidoptera
- Superfamily: Noctuoidea
- Family: Erebidae
- Genus: Dysgonia
- Species: D. calefasciens

Binomial name
- Dysgonia calefasciens (Guenée, 1852)

Synonyms
- Parallelia calefasciens (Walker, 1858); Naxia calefaciens Walker, 1858; Parallelia mediifascia Wileman & South, 1920; Dysgonia mediifascia (Wileman & South, 1920)

Species of moth

Dysgonia calefasciens is a moth of the family Noctuidae first described by Achille Guenée in 1852. It is found from the north-eastern parts of the Himalayas, Thailand, Sundaland, Sri Lanka, the Philippines to Seram Island.
