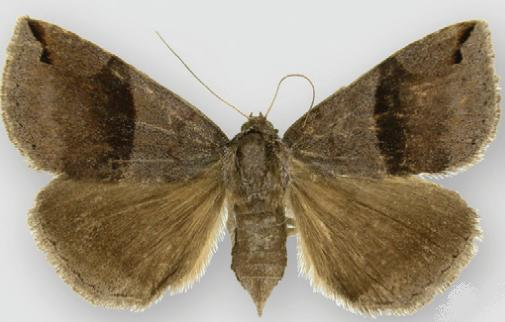

Scientific classification
- Kingdom: Animalia
- Phylum: Arthropoda
- Class: Insecta
- Order: Lepidoptera
- Superfamily: Noctuoidea
- Family: Erebidae
- Genus: Gondysia
- Species: G. similis

Binomial name
- Gondysia similis (Guenée, 1852)

Synonyms
- Dysgonia apicalis (Guenée, 1852); Dysgonia concolor (Grote, 1893); Dysgonia similis (Guenée, 1852); Neadysgonia similis Sullivan, 2010

= Gondysia similis =

Species of moth

Gondysia similis, the gordonia darkwing is a moth of the family Noctuidae. The species was first described by Achille Guenée in 1852. It is found in the US from North Carolina to Mississippi and Florida. The food plant occurs in Alabama and Mississippi and the moth could be expected from these areas as well.

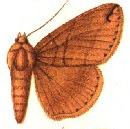
Illustration

The wingspan is about 37 mm. There are three or more generations in North Carolina with adults on wing from April to September.

The larvae feed on Gordonia lasianthus.
