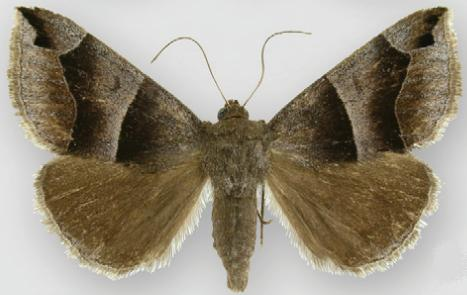

Scientific classification
- Kingdom: Animalia
- Phylum: Arthropoda
- Class: Insecta
- Order: Lepidoptera
- Superfamily: Noctuoidea
- Family: Erebidae
- Genus: Gondysia
- Species: G. consobrina

Binomial name
- Gondysia consobrina (Guenée, 1852)

Synonyms
- Ophiusa consobrina Guenée in Boisduval and Guenée, 1852; Dysgonia redditura (Walker, 1858); Dysgonia consobrina (Guenée, 1852); Gondysia pertorrida Berio, 1955

= Gondysia consobrina =

Species of moth

Gondysia consobrina, the consobrina darkwing moth, is a moth of the family Noctuidae. The species was first described by Achille Guenée in 1852. It is found in the US, from North Carolina to Louisiana. Specimens have been recorded from all of the south-eastern states in the range except Alabama and Tennessee.

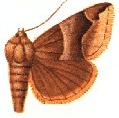
Illustration

There are multiple generations per year.

The food plant is unknown.
