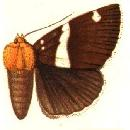

Scientific classification
- Kingdom: Animalia
- Phylum: Arthropoda
- Clade: Pancrustacea
- Class: Insecta
- Order: Lepidoptera
- Superfamily: Noctuoidea
- Family: Erebidae
- Genus: Buzara
- Species: B. infractafinis

Binomial name
- Buzara infractafinis (Lucas, 1894)

Synonyms
- Ophiusa medioalbata Bethune-Baker, 1906; Dysgonia medioalbata (Bethune-Baker, 1906); Fodina infractafinis Lucas, 1894; Dysgonia infractifinis Lucas, 1894; Parallelia infractafinis (Lucas, 1894); Parallelia infractifinis (Lucas, 1894); Dysgonia infractifinis (Lucas, 1894)

= Buzara infractafinis =

Species of moth

Buzara infractafinis is a moth of the family Erebidae. It is found in Australia.

The larvae feed on Breynia species.
