= Dysgonia correctana =

Scientific classification
- Kingdom: Animalia
- Phylum: Arthropoda
- Clade: Pancrustacea
- Class: Insecta
- Order: Lepidoptera
- Superfamily: Noctuoidea
- Family: Erebidae
- Genus: Dysgonia
- Species: D. correctana

Binomial name
- Dysgonia correctana (Walker, 1865)

Synonyms
- Parallelia correctana (Walker, 1865); Ophisma correctata Walker, 1865; Parallelia crenulata Bethune-Baker, 1914

Species of moth

Dysgonia correctana is a moth of the family Noctuidae first described by Francis Walker in 1865. It is found from the northern Moluccas to the Bismarck Islands and probably the Solomon and palentinia Islands.
