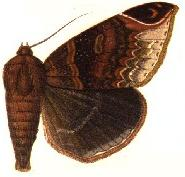

Scientific classification
- Domain: Eukaryota
- Kingdom: Animalia
- Phylum: Arthropoda
- Class: Insecta
- Order: Lepidoptera
- Superfamily: Noctuoidea
- Family: Noctuidae
- Genus: Pindara
- Species: P. serratilinea

Binomial name
- Pindara serratilinea (Bethune-Baker, 1906)

Synonyms
- Ophiusa serratilinea Bethune-Baker, 1906; Parallelia serratilinea (Bethune-Baker, 1906); Dysgonia serratilinea (Bethune-Baker, 1906)

= Pindara serratilinea =

Species of moth

Pindara serratilinea is a moth of the family Noctuidae first described by George Thomas Bethune-Baker in 1906. It is found in the Australian state of Queensland.

The wingspan is about 30 mm.
