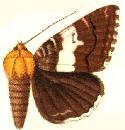

Scientific classification
- Kingdom: Animalia
- Phylum: Arthropoda
- Clade: Pancrustacea
- Class: Insecta
- Order: Lepidoptera
- Superfamily: Noctuoidea
- Family: Erebidae
- Genus: Buzara
- Species: B. latizona

Binomial name
- Buzara latizona (Butler, 1874)

Synonyms
- Ophiusa latizona Butler, 1874; Parallelia latizona (Butler, 1874); Leucanitis schraderi Felder & Rogenhofer, 1874; Dysgonia schraderi (Felder & Rogenhofer, 1874); Dysgonia latizona (Butler, 1874)

= Buzara latizona =

Species of moth

Buzara latizona is a moth of the family Erebidae. It is found in New Guinea and the northern half of Australia.

The wingspan is about 40 mm.

The larvae feed on Phyllanthus species.
