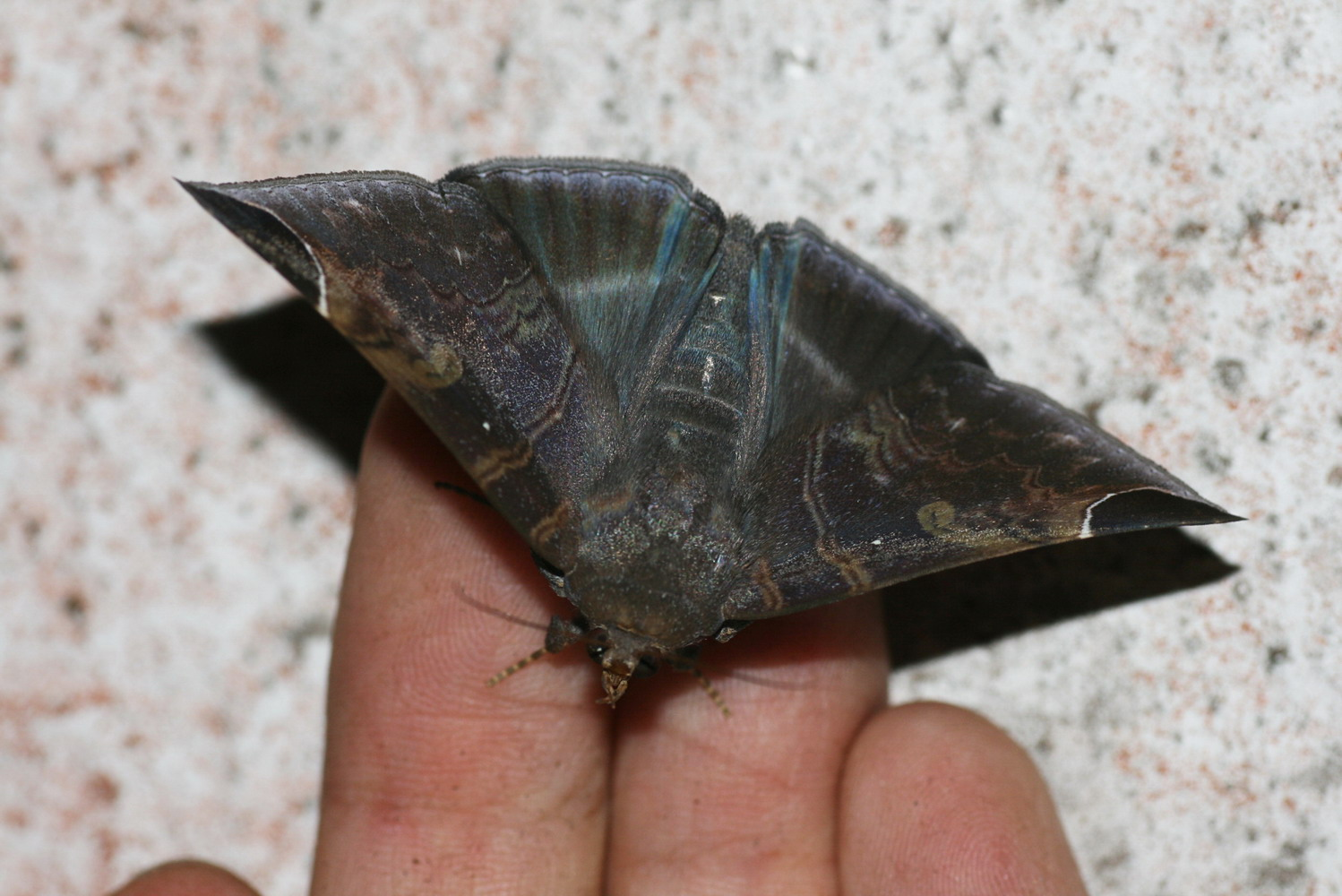
- Pindara illibata

Scientific classification
- Domain: Eukaryota
- Kingdom: Animalia
- Phylum: Arthropoda
- Class: Insecta
- Order: Lepidoptera
- Superfamily: Noctuoidea
- Family: Noctuidae
- Genus: Pindara; Moore, 1885

= Pindara =

Genus of moths

Pindara is a genus of moths of the family Noctuidae.

== Species ==
- Pindara illibata (Fabricius, 1775)
- Pindara prisca (Walker, 1858)
- Pindara serratilinea (Bethune-Baker, 1906)
