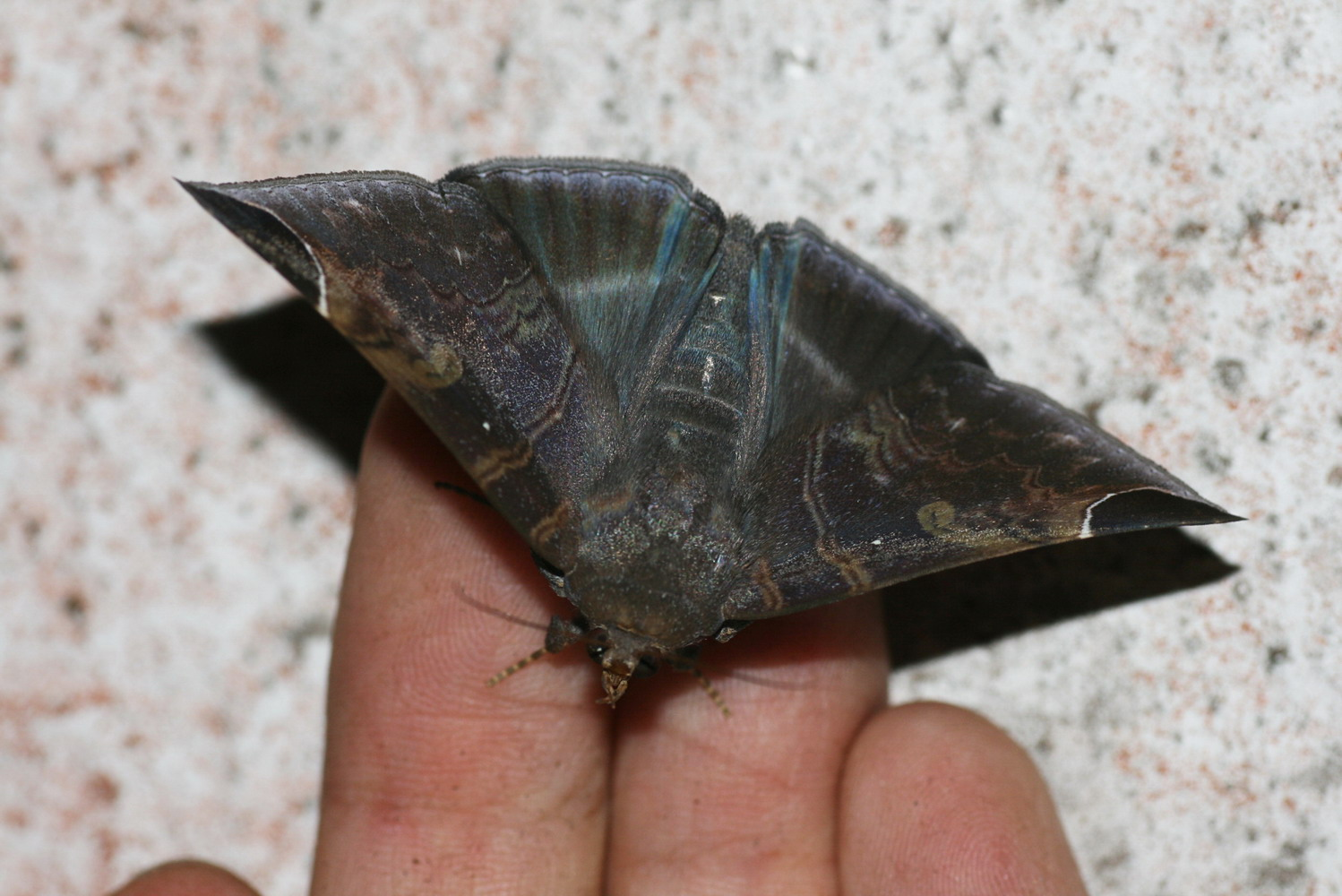

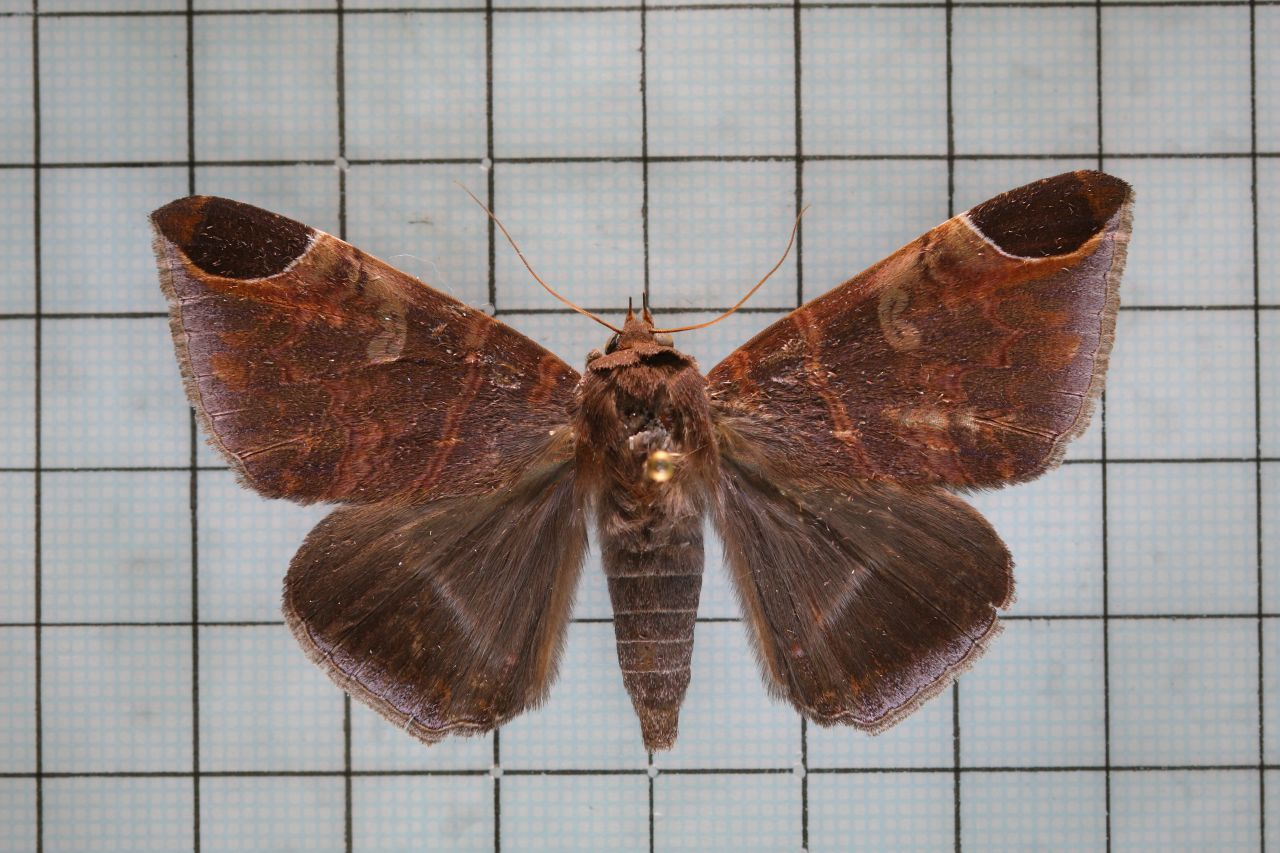

Scientific classification
- Kingdom: Animalia
- Phylum: Arthropoda
- Class: Insecta
- Order: Lepidoptera
- Superfamily: Noctuoidea
- Family: Noctuidae
- Genus: Pindara
- Species: P. illibata

Binomial name
- Pindara illibata (Fabricius, 1775)

Synonyms
- Noctua illibata Fabricius, 1775; Ohiusa illibata Fabricius, 1775; Hemeroblemma peropaca Hübner, 1825; Ophisma laetabilis Guenée, 1852; Pindara colorata Warren, 1913; Dysgonia peropaca (Hübner, 1825); Dysgonia laetabilis (Guenée, 1852); Dysgonia colorata (Warren, 1913); Dysgonia illibata (Fabricius, 1775)

= Pindara illibata =

Species of moth

Pindara illibata is a moth of the family Noctuidae first described by Johan Christian Fabricius in 1775. It is found in the Oriental region, including Taiwan, China, India, Sri Lanka, Myanmar, Japan and Borneo.

== Description ==
Its wingspan is about 72 mm. A pale rufous moth. Forewings with short sub-basal and oblique antemedial medial dark lines on pale reddish bands. Renifrom large with a dark line in it. Three indistinct waved postmedial line found on pale reddish suffusion and one sub-marginal line present. A large semi-circular patch with white edges at apex. Abdomen and hindwings fuscous brown, where hindwings with indistinct pale medial line. The margin except at apex is greyish.

The larvae feed on Bischofia and Elaeocarpus species.
