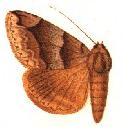

Scientific classification
- Kingdom: Animalia
- Phylum: Arthropoda
- Class: Insecta
- Order: Lepidoptera
- Superfamily: Noctuoidea
- Family: Erebidae
- Genus: Dysgonia
- Species: D. mandschuriana

Binomial name
- Dysgonia mandschuriana (Staudinger, 1892)

Synonyms
- Grammodes algira var. mandschuriana Staudinger 1892; Parallelia mandschuriana (Staudinger 1892); Dysgonia postfusca Bryk, 1949; Dysgonia mimula (Warren, 1913)

= Dysgonia mandschuriana =

Species of moth

Dysgonia mandschuriana is a moth of the family Noctuidae first described by Otto Staudinger in 1892. It is found in China, Japan (Honshu, Kyushu), Korea (North, Central, South, Jeju Island) and the Russian Far East (the Primorye region).
