= Buzara frontinus =

Scientific classification
- Kingdom: Animalia
- Phylum: Arthropoda
- Clade: Pancrustacea
- Class: Insecta
- Order: Lepidoptera
- Superfamily: Noctuoidea
- Family: Erebidae
- Genus: Buzara
- Species: B. frontinus

Binomial name
- Buzara frontinus (Donovan, 1805)

Synonyms
- Parallia frontina; Noctua scapularis Guérin-Méneville, [1831]; Ophiusa pyrrhargyra Walker, 1858; Spanocala atrata Scott, 1891; Papilio frontinus Donovan, 1805; Dysgonia frontinus (Donovan, 1805)

Species of moth

Buzara frontinus is a moth of the family Erebidae, found in the coastal areas of southern Queensland and New South Wales.

The wingspan is about 60 mm.

The larvae feed on plants of the genus Breynia.
