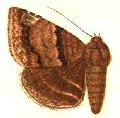

Scientific classification
- Kingdom: Animalia
- Phylum: Arthropoda
- Clade: Pancrustacea
- Class: Insecta
- Order: Lepidoptera
- Superfamily: Noctuoidea
- Family: Erebidae
- Genus: Buzara
- Species: B. umbrosa

Binomial name
- Buzara umbrosa (Walker, 1865)

Synonyms
- Dysgonia umbrosa (Walker, 1865); Ophiusa umbrosa Walker, 1865; Parallelia umbrosa (Walker, 1865); Parallelia obumbrata Walker; Dysgonia obumbrata Walker

= Buzara umbrosa =

Species of moth

Buzara umbrosa is a moth of the family Erebidae. It is found in China, India and Sri Lanka.

== Taxonomy ==
Buzara umbrosa was considered a synonym of Buzara onelia, but research has shown it is a valid species.

== Description ==
Its wingspan is about 44–46 mm. It is a dark grey brown with a purplish tinge. The head and collar are usually fulvous. Forewings with brown suffusion. Sub-basal, antemedial and postmedial indistinct waved lines and antemedial and medial ill-defined bands are greyish. There is a grey apical patch with whitish edges, and sinuous dark line runs from it to inner margin. An indistinct dentate submarginal line present with a greyish margin. Hindwings with traces of medial and antemedial pale lines found near inner margin. Outer margin is greyish.

Larva with rudimentary first two abdominal proleg pairs. Body greyish white above and olive-grey below, with black spots in somewhat linear series on each somite. A reddish lateral spot found on fourth somite. Pupa efflorescent. The larvae feed on Phyllanthus and Sauropus species.
