= List of moths of São Tomé and Príncipe =

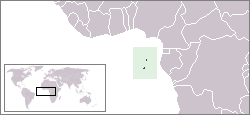
Location of São Tomé and Príncipe

There are about 332 known species of moth that had been recorded from São Tomé and Príncipe. Moths (mostly nocturnal) and butterflies (mostly diurnal) together make up the taxonomic order Lepidoptera.

This is a list of moth species which have been recorded in São Tomé and Príncipe, an island nation off the western equatorial coast of Central Africa.

== Alucitidae ==
- Alucita atomoclasta (Meyrick, 1934)

== Arctiidae ==
- Afrasura discocellularis (Strand, 1912)
- Afrasura hieroglyphica (Bethune-Baker, 1911)
- Afrasura pectinatissima Volynkin & László, 2018
- Afrasura saotomensis Volynkin & László, 2018
- Amerila puella (Fabricius, 1793)
- Asura thomensis Rothschild, 1913
- Cyana rufifrons (Rothschild, 1912)
- Disparctia thomensis (Joicey & Talbot, 1926)
- Euchromia lethe (Fabricius, 1775)
- Podomachla apicalis Walker, 1854
- Podomachla insularis (Talbot, 1929)
- Utetheisa pulchella (Linnaeus, 1758)

== Cosmopterigidae ==
- Anatrachyntis simplex (Walsingham, 1891)

== Cossidae ==
- Eulophonotus myrmeleon Felder, 1874
- Eulophonotus nigrodiscalis Yakovlev, 2011
- Polyphagozerra coffeae (Nietner, 1861)

== Crambidae ==
- Aethaloessa floridalis (Zeller, 1852)
- Agathodes thomensis Castel-Branco, 1973
- Agrotera albalis Maes, 2003
- Bradina itysalis Viette, 1957
- Cotachena smaragdina (Butler, 1875)
- Diaphana indica (Saunders, 1851
- Eudonia thomealis (Viette, 1957)
- Glyphodes rhombalis Viette, 1957
- Hyalobathra barnsalis (Viette, 1957)
- Pardomima martinalis Viette, 1957
- Paschiodes scoparialis (Viette, 1957)
- Paschiodes thomealis Viette, 1957
- Pseudonoorda palealis (Viette, 1957)
- Pyrausta zyphalis Viette, 1958
- Spoladea recurvalis (Fabricius, 1775)
- Syllepte amelialis Viette, 1957
- Syllepte lagoalis Viette, 1957

== Elachistidae ==
- Ethmia spyrathodes Meyrick, 1922

== Erebidae ==
- Achaea faber Holland, 1894
- Dysgonia angularis (Boisduval, 1833)
- Erebus walkeri (Butler, 1875)
- Eudocima fullonia (Clerck, 1764)
- Lygephila pastinum (Treitschke, 1826)
- Hypena obacerralis Walker, [1859]
- Hypena strigata (Fabricius, 1794)
- Hypena varialis Walker, 1866

== Gelechiidae ==
- Theatrocopia roseoviridis Walsingham, 1897

== Geometridae ==
- Anoectomychus lautipars (Prout, 1927)
- Antitrygodes acinosa Prout, 1932
- Ascotis glaucotoxa (Prout, 1927)
- Asthenotricha unipecten (Prout, 1915)
- Bathycolpodes subfuscata (Warren, 1902)
- Cabera nathaliae Herbulot, 1991
- Cabera subalba (Warren, 1901)
- Chloroclystis consobrina (Warren, 1901)
- Cleora subcincta (Warren, 1901)
- Comostolopsis rubristicta (Warren, 1899)
- Disclisioprocta natalata (Walker, 1862)
- Gymnoscelis birivulata Warren, 1902
- Gymnoscelis crassata Warren, 1901
- Idaea insularum (Prout, 1927)
- Mesocolpia subcomosa Warren, 1901
- Pingasa decristata Warren, 1902
- Pingasa hypoleucaria (Guenée, 1862)
- Problepsis ochripicta Warren, 1901
- Racotis squalida (Butler, 1878)
- Scopula minorata (Boisduval, 1833)
- Scopula quintaria (Prout, 1916)
- Thalassodes quadraria Guenée, 1857
- Xanthorhoe tamsi D. S. Fletcher, 1963
- Zamarada principis Herbulot, 1958
- Zamarada tomensis Pierre-Baltus, 2005

== Gracillariidae ==
- Aristaea onychota (Meyrick, 1908)

== Lasiocampidae ==
- Stoermeriana thomensis Talbot, 1929

== Lymantriidae ==
- Crorema quadristigata Talbot, 1929
- Eudasychira thomensis (Talbot, 1929)

== Noctuidae ==
- Acantuerta thomensis (Jordan, 1904)
- Aegocera naveli Le Cerf, 1922
- Anticarsia rubricans (Boisduval, 1833)
- Chrysodeixis chalcites (Esper, 1789)
- Condica pauperata (Walker, 1858)
- Conservula cinisigna de Joannis, 1906
- Eutelia blandiatrix (Guenée, 1852)
- Feliniopsis africana (Schaus & Clements, 1893)
- Feliniopsis gueneei (Laporte, 1973)
- Feliniopsis hosplitoides (Laporte, 1979)
- Lithacodia blandula (Guenée, 1862)
- Plusiopalpa dichora Holland, 1894
- Trachea chlorochrysa Berio, 1937

== Notodontidae ==
- Afrocerura cameroona (Bethune-Baker, 1927)

== Oecophoridae ==
- Metachanda citrodesma (Meyrick, 1911)
- Stathmopoda holothecta Meyrick, 1934

== Plutellidae ==
- Plutella xylostella (Linnaeus, 1758)

== Pterophoridae ==
- Exelastis crepuscularis (Meyrick, 1909)
- Platyptilia infesta Meyrick, 1934
- Platyptilia molopias Meyrick, 1906
- Platyptilia toxochorda Meyrick, 1934
- Pterophorus niveodactyla (Pagenstecher, 1900)
- Stenoptilodes taprobanes (Felder & Rogenhofer, 1875)

== Pyralidae ==
- Galleria mellonella (Linnaeus, 1758)
- Endotricha altitudinalis (Viette, 1957)
- Endotricha tamsi Whalley, 1963
- Endotricha thomealis (Viette, 1957)
- Endotricha viettealis Whalley, 1963
- Plodia interpunctella (Hübner, 1813)

== Saturniidae ==
- Bunaea oremansi Bouyer, 2008

== Sphingidae ==
- Acherontia atropos (Linnaeus, 1758)
- Euchloron megaera (Linnaeus, 1758)
- Hippotion celerio (Linnaeus, 1758)
- Hippotion talboti Clark, 1930
- Hyles livornica (Esper, 1779)
- Hyles tithymali (Boisduval, 1834)
- Nephele accentifera (Palisot de Beauvois, 1821)
- Temnora fumosa (Walker, 1856)

== Tineidae ==
- Erechthias dracaenura (Meyrick, 1934)
- Harmaclona tephrantha (Meyrick, 1916)
- Opogona antiarcha Meyrick, 1934

== Tortricidae ==
- Afroploce karsholti Aarvik, 2004
- Anthozela macambrarae Razowski & Wojtusiak, 2014
- Astronauta stellans (Meyrick, 1922)
- Choristoneura dinota (Meyrick, 1918)
- Choristoneura occidentalis (Walsingham, 1891)
- Choristoneura saotome Razowski & Wojtusiak, 2014
- Cosmorrhyncha microcosma Aarvik, 2004
- Crocidosema plebejana Zeller, 1847
- Dracontogena metamorphica (Meyrick, 1928)
- Dracontogena tonitrualis (Meyrick, 1934)
- Eccopsis incultana (Walker, 1863)
- Eccopsis praecedens Walsingham, 1897
- Eucosma sphalerodes Meyrick, 1934
- Eucosma tonitrualis Meyrick, 1934
- Ercosmocydia terreirana Razowski & Wojtusiak, 2014
- Kennelia albifascies (Walsingham, 1900)
- Lobesia aeolopa Meyrick, 1907
- Lobesia vanillana (Joannis, 1900)
- Olethreutes decidua (Meyrick, 1934)
- Olethreutes doctrinalis (Meyrick, 1934)
- Olethreutes gutturalis (Meyrick, 1934)
- Peridaedala algosa (Meyrick, 1912)
- Prophaecasia usambarae (Razowski & Wojtusiak, 2014)
- Thaumatotibia batrachopa (Meyrick, 1908)
- Thaumatotibia leucotreta (Meyrick, 1913)
- Tortrix dinota Meyrick, 1918
- Tortrix prionistis Meyrick, 1928

== Uraniidae ==
- Epiplema scripta ( Talbot, 1929
- Phazaca angulata (Talbot, 1929)

== Zygaenidae ==
- Saliunca styx (Fabricius, 1775)
