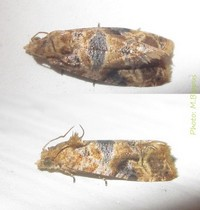

Scientific classification
- Domain: Eukaryota
- Kingdom: Animalia
- Phylum: Arthropoda
- Class: Insecta
- Order: Lepidoptera
- Family: Tortricidae
- Subfamily: Olethreutinae
- Tribe: Olethreutini
- Genus: Lobesia; Guenée, 1845

= Lobesia =

Genus of tortrix moths

Lobesia is a genus of moths belonging to the subfamily Olethreutinae of the family Tortricidae.

== Species ==
- Lobesia abscisana (Doubleday, 1859)
- Lobesia acroleuca Diakonoff, 1973
- Lobesia aeolopa Meyrick, 1907
- Lobesia albotegula Diakonoff, 1954
- Lobesia ambigua Diakonoff, 1954
- Lobesia archaetypa Diakonoff, 1992
- Lobesia arenacea (Meyrick, 1917)
- Lobesia arescophanes (Turner, 1945)
- Lobesia artemisiana (Zeller, 1847)
- Lobesia atrata Diakonoff, 1973
- Lobesia atsushii Bae, 1993
- Lobesia attributana (Kennel, 1901)
- Lobesia bicinctana (Duponchel, in Godart, 1842)
- Lobesia bisyringnata Bae, 1993
- Lobesia botrana ([Denis & Schiffermüller], 1775)
- Lobesia candida Diakonoff, 1973
- Lobesia carduana (Busck, 1907)
- Lobesia ceratana (Rebel, 1907)
- Lobesia cinerariae (Nolcken, 1882)
- Lobesia clarisecta Meyrick, 1932
- Lobesia clavosa Diakonoff, 1973
- Lobesia coccophaga Falkovitsh, 1970
- Lobesia confinitana (Staudinger, 1871)
- Lobesia crimea Falkovitsh, 1970
- Lobesia crithopa Diakonoff, 1957
- Lobesia cunninghamiacola (Liu & Bai, 1977)
- Lobesia deltophora (Meyrick, 1921)
- Lobesia drasteria Razowski, 2013
- Lobesia duplicata Falkovitsh, 1970
- Lobesia elasmopyga Diakonoff, 1973
- Lobesia embrithes Diakonoff, 1961
- Lobesia extrusana (Walker, 1863)
- Lobesia fetialis (Meyrick, 1920)
- Lobesia fictana (Kennel, 1901)
- Lobesia fuligana (Haworth, [1811])
- Lobesia genialis Meyrick, 1912
- Lobesia glebifera (Meyrick, 1912)
- Lobesia globosterigma Liu & Bae, 1994
- Lobesia harmonia (Meyrick, 1908)
- Lobesia hecista Razowski, 2013
- Lobesia hendrickxi (Ghesquire, 1940)
- Lobesia herculeana (Kennel, 1900)
- Lobesia incystata Liu & Yang, 1987
- Lobesia indusiana (Zeller, 1847)
- Lobesia isochroa (Meyrick, 1891)
- Lobesia kurokoi Bae, 1995
- Lobesia leucospilana (Mabille, 1900)
- Lobesia limoniana (Millire, 1860)
- Lobesia lithogonia Diakonoff, 1954
- Lobesia littoralis (Humphreys & Westwood, 1845)
- Lobesia longisterigma Liu & Bae, 1994
- Lobesia macroptera Liu & Bae, 1994
- Lobesia matici Stanoiu & Nemes, 1974
- Lobesia mechanodes (Meyrick, 1936)
- Lobesia melanops Diakonoff, 1956
- Lobesia meliscia (Meyrick, 1910)
- Lobesia metachlora (Meyrick, 1913)
- Lobesia mieae Kawabe, 1980
- Lobesia minuta Diakonoff, 1956
- Lobesia montana Diakonoff, 1954
- Lobesia moriutii Bae, 1995
- Lobesia neptunia (Walsingham, 1907)
- Lobesia orphica (Meyrick, 1920)
- Lobesia orthomorpha (Meyrick, 1928)
- Lobesia oxymochla (Meyrick, 1917)
- Lobesia oxypercna (Meyrick, 1930)
- Lobesia paradisea Diakonoff, 1953
- Lobesia paraphragma (Meyrick, 1922)
- Lobesia parvulana (Walker, 1863)
- Lobesia pattayae Bae, 1995
- Lobesia peltophora (Meyrick, 1911)
- Lobesia peplotoma Meyrick, 1928
- Lobesia physophora (Lower, 1901)
- Lobesia porrectana (Zeller, 1847)
- Lobesia postica Bae, 1993
- Lobesia primaria (Meyrick, 1909)
- Lobesia pyriformis Bae & Park, 1992
- Lobesia quadratica (Meyrick, 1912)
- Lobesia quaggana (Mann, 1855)
- Lobesia rapta Diakonoff, 1957
- Lobesia relicta Diakonoff, 1954
- Lobesia reliquana (Hübner, [1825])
- Lobesia reprobata Clarke, 1976
- Lobesia rhipidoma (Meyrick, 1925)
- Lobesia rhombophora Diakonoff, 1954
- Lobesia scorpiodes (Meyrick, 1908)
- Lobesia semosa Diakonoff, 1992
- Lobesia serangodes (Meyrick, 1920)
- Lobesia siamensis Bae, 1995
- Lobesia stenaspis (Meyrick, 1921)
- Lobesia stericta (Meyrick, 1911)
- Lobesia subherculeana (Filipjev, 1924)
- Lobesia sutteri Diakonoff, 1956
- Lobesia symploca (Turner, 1926)
- Lobesia takahiroi Bae, 1996
- Lobesia thlastopa Meyrick in Caradja & Meyrick, 1937
- Lobesia transtrifera (Meyrick, 1920)
- Lobesia tritoma Diakonoff, 1953
- Lobesia ultima Diakonoff, 1954
- Lobesia vanillana (de Joannis, 1900)
- Lobesia vectis Diakonoff, 1983
- Lobesia virulenta Bae & Komai, 1991
- Lobesia vittigera (Meyrick, 1932)
- Lobesia xenosema Diakonoff, 1983
- Lobesia xylistis (Lower, 1901)
- Lobesia yasudai Bae & Komai, 1991

== See also ==
- List of Tortricidae genera
