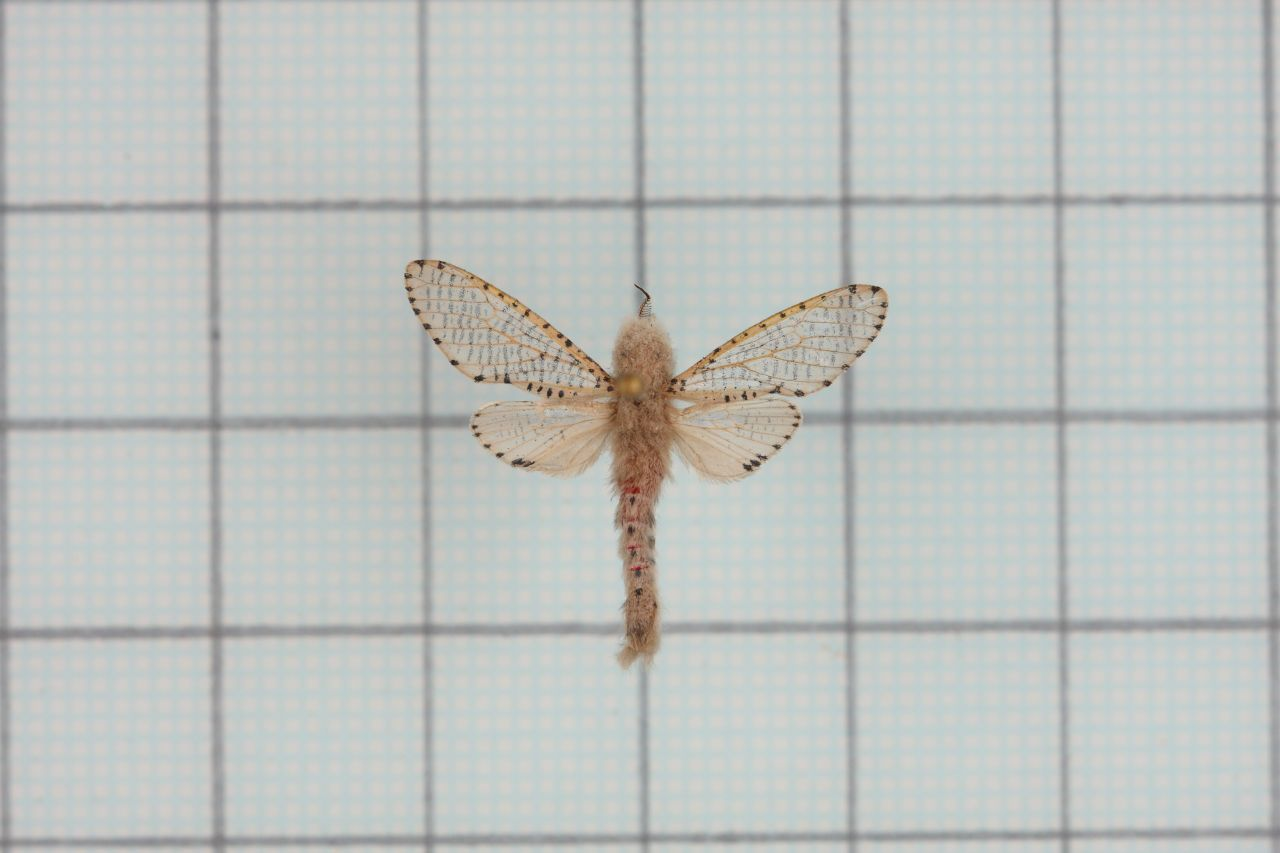

Scientific classification
- Kingdom: Animalia
- Phylum: Arthropoda
- Class: Insecta
- Order: Lepidoptera
- Family: Cossidae
- Genus: Polyphagozerra
- Species: P. coffeae

Binomial name
- Polyphagozerra coffeae Nietner, 1861

Synonyms
- Zeuzera coffeae Nietner, 1861; Zeuzera oblita Swinhoe, 1890; Zeuzera coffeae virens Toxopeus, 1948; Zeuzera coffeae angulata Arora, 1976

= Polyphagozerra coffeae =

Red coffee borer

Species of moth

Polyphagozerra coffeae, the red coffee borer or coffee carpenter, is a moth of the family Cossidae. It was described by John Nietner in 1861 and is found in Asia. Records from the Moluccas and New Guinea refer to Polyphagozerra reticulata, which was previously considered to be a synonym of P. coffeae. It is a widespread pest that attacks many plants.

The wingspan is 70–80 mm. Females are much larger and relatively rare.

== Description ==
The characteristic feature is a forewing with vein 6 from above angle of cell. All three segments of the thorax have a pair of small black spots. The abdomen is black, clothed with white hairs. Forewings with the spots small, black and all obsolescent except those along the costa, outer margin and inner margin. Hindwing with a few obsolescent small spots and a prominent marginal series from the apex to vein 2, where they sometimes conjoined. In the female, spots of the forewing are fewer in number than the male, but more prominent and tinged with metallic blue. Larva and pupa reddish brown.

== Ecology ==
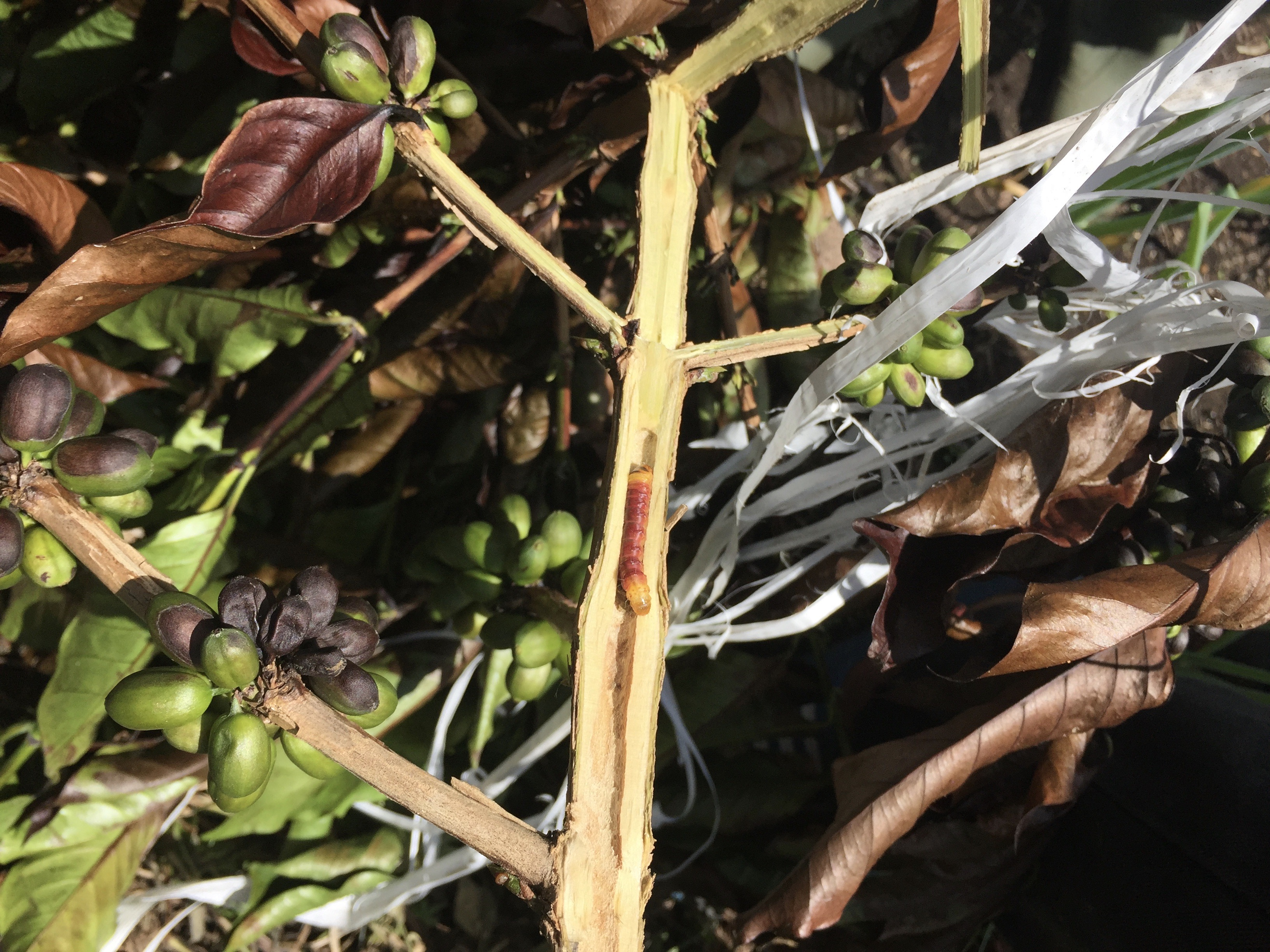
Larva of a Zeuzera coffeae Nietner, or red branch borer in the stem of a coffee tree.

Female lay eggs on stem of the host plants. They are arranged in several rows on the branches of the plant. Larvae hatch out from the eggs in about ten days. The larvae feed on a wide range of plants, including Casuarina, Erythroxylum, Acalypha, Phyllanthus, Doryalis, Hydnocarpus, Annona, Cinnamomum, Persea, Phoebe, Amherstia, Cassia, Pericopsis, Xylia, Gossypium, Hibiscus, Cedrela, Chukrasia, Melia, Swietenia, Psidium, Grevillea, Crataegus, Eriobotrya, Coffea, Citrus, Santalum, Filicium, Nephelium, Schleichera, Cestrum, Theobroma, Cryptomeria, Camellia, Clerodendrum, Lantana, Tectona and Vitex species. The larvae occasionally reach pest status on coffee, tea, cotton, cocoa, kapok, coca and teak. They bore into the stem or branches of their host plant.

In the Thrissur district of Kerala, India, larvae of the coffee carpenter were found damaging allspice for the first time.

== Pest attack ==
After larval attack, the crops can show many symptoms. Branches and twigs wilt quickly and become brittle resulting in them breaking off from the plant. Holes are frequently visible from which the frass is exuded. Stems show dieback due to internal feeding and finally wilt. After complete internal feeding, the dieback quickly occurs.

== Control ==
Cultural methods of control include hand picking of adults and larva immediately after an infestation is spotted or planting barrier crops such as taro, sweet potato, Leucaena glauca or Pueraria. Many parasitoids and predators are used for biological control. To control larva, Bracon zeuzerae, larva of Eulophonotus myrmeleon, and Pantorhytes species are used. Woodpeckers are also effective.
