= Lobesia lithogonia =

Scientific classification
- Kingdom: Animalia
- Phylum: Arthropoda
- Clade: Pancrustacea
- Class: Insecta
- Order: Lepidoptera
- Family: Tortricidae
- Genus: Lobesia
- Species: L. lithogonia

Binomial name
- Lobesia lithogonia Diakonoff, 1954

Species of moth

Lobesia lithogonia is a moth of the family Tortricidae first described by Alexey Diakonoff in 1954. It is found in Thailand, Sri Lanka, Java, Borneo and New Guinea.

== Description ==
The wingspan is 9–12 mm. Its larval food plant is Syzygium pycnanthum.
