= Adoxophyes privatana =

Scientific classification
- Kingdom: Animalia
- Phylum: Arthropoda
- Clade: Pancrustacea
- Class: Insecta
- Order: Lepidoptera
- Family: Tortricidae
- Genus: Adoxophyes
- Species: A. privatana

Binomial name
- Adoxophyes privatana (Walker, 1863)

Synonyms
- Dichelia privatana Walker, 1863; Adoxophyes euryomis Meyrick in Gardiner, 1902; Adoxophyes privata Caradja, 1938

Species of moth

Adoxophyes privatana, the appleleaf-curling moth, is a moth of the family Tortricidae. The species was first described by Francis Walker in 1863. It is native to south-east Asia, where it has been recorded from Taiwan, Hong Kong, Hainan in China, Nepal, India, Sri-Lanka, Thailand, Vietnam, western Malaysia, Singapore, Sumatra, Java, Borneo, the Philippines and the Chagos Archipelago. It is an accidental introduction in Great Britain.

== Description ==
The wingspan is 15–19 mm. In China this species has several generations per year.

The larvae feed on various trees, including fruit trees such as mandarin and guava. Recorded food plants include Alternanthera sessilis, Cantharospermum barbatum, Calophyllum inophyllum, Camellia, Carica papaya, Cassia siamea, Citrus, Croton, Derris, Eugenia aquea, Evodia accedens, Desmodium gyroides, Eugenia densiflora, Flacourtia, Glycine max, Jasminum sambac, Lantana, Linum, Mangifera indica, Nephelium lappaceum, Nephelium litchi, Ricinus, Schima noronhae, Sida acuta, Solanum torvum, Theobroma and Vitex negundo.
