= Lobesia genialis =

Scientific classification
- Kingdom: Animalia
- Phylum: Arthropoda
- Class: Insecta
- Order: Lepidoptera
- Family: Tortricidae
- Genus: Lobesia
- Species: L. genialis

Binomial name
- Lobesia genialis Meyrick, 1912

Species of moth

Lobesia genialis is a moth of the family Tortricidae. It is found in Thailand and Sri Lanka.

Lobesia genialis is very similar to Lobesia fetialis; the two species can be separated by differences in the male genitalia. The horns of the gnathos are pointed, and the lower angle of the cucullus is projecting.
