= Eulophonotus hyalinipennis =

Scientific classification
- Kingdom: Animalia
- Phylum: Arthropoda
- Class: Insecta
- Order: Lepidoptera
- Family: Cossidae
- Genus: Eulophonotus
- Species: E. hyalinipennis

Binomial name
- Eulophonotus hyalinipennis (Strand, 1910)

Synonyms
- Zeuzerops hyalinipennis Strand, 1910

Species of moth

Eulophonotus hyalinipennis is a moth in the family Cossidae. It is found in South Africa, Eswatini, Mozambique, Tanzania and Zimbabwe.
