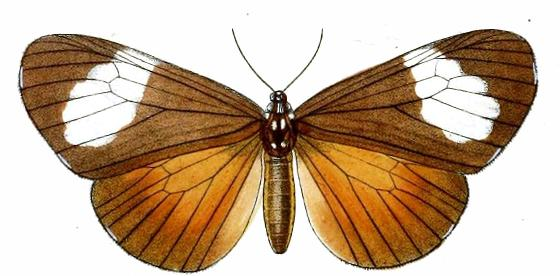

Scientific classification
- Domain: Eukaryota
- Kingdom: Animalia
- Phylum: Arthropoda
- Class: Insecta
- Order: Lepidoptera
- Superfamily: Noctuoidea
- Family: Erebidae
- Subfamily: Arctiinae
- Genus: Podomachla
- Species: P. chromis

Binomial name
- Podomachla chromis H. Druce, 1882

Synonyms
- Nyctemera chromis H. Druce, 1882; Deilemera chromis f. tessmanni Strand, 1912; Nyctemera ehromis Pagenstecher, 1901

= Podomachla chromis =

Species of moth

Podomachla chromis is a moth in the family Erebidae first described by Herbert Druce in 1882. It is found in Cameroon, the Democratic Republic of the Congo and Equatorial Guinea.

The forewings are dusky brown. The nerves are all black, except on the white band which crosses the wings from about the middle of the costal margin nearly to the anal angle. The hindwings are chrome yellow, shading to pale brown on the outer margin. The underside is the same as the upperside. The head and thorax are black and the abdomen is brown above, but the underside is yellow.
