= Pardomima pompusalis =

Scientific classification
- Kingdom: Animalia
- Phylum: Arthropoda
- Class: Insecta
- Order: Lepidoptera
- Family: Crambidae
- Genus: Pardomima
- Species: P. pompusalis

Binomial name
- Pardomima pompusalis (Walker, 1859)

Synonyms
- Botys pompusalis Walker, 1859

Species of moth

Pardomima pompusalis is a moth in the family Crambidae. It was described by Francis Walker in 1859. It is found in Australia, where it has been recorded from Queensland.
