= Eutelia snelleni =

Scientific classification
- Kingdom: Animalia
- Phylum: Arthropoda
- Clade: Pancrustacea
- Class: Insecta
- Order: Lepidoptera
- Superfamily: Noctuoidea
- Family: Euteliidae
- Genus: Eutelia
- Species: E. snelleni

Binomial name
- Eutelia snelleni Saalmüller, 1881

Synonyms
- Ingura snelleni Saalmüller, 1881

Species of moth

Eutelia snelleni is a moth of the family Noctuidae. It is known from Sierra Leone, Nigeria and Madagascar.

It has a wingspan of approx. 20 mm.

Saalmüller described this species from a holotype from Madagascar and named this species after the Dutch entomologist Pieter Cornelius Tobias Snellen.
