= Pardomima phalaromima =

Scientific classification
- Kingdom: Animalia
- Phylum: Arthropoda
- Class: Insecta
- Order: Lepidoptera
- Family: Crambidae
- Genus: Pardomima
- Species: P. phalaromima

Binomial name
- Pardomima phalaromima (Meyrick, 1933)

Synonyms
- Entephria phalaromima Meyrick, 1933

Species of moth

Pardomima phalaromima is a moth in the family Crambidae. It was described by Edward Meyrick in 1933. It is found in Angola, Cameroon, the Republic of the Congo, the Democratic Republic of the Congo (Kinshasa, Equateur, Orientale, Katanga), Equatorial Guinea (Bioko), Guinea, Ivory Coast, Kenya, Malawi, Nigeria, Sierra Leone and Tanzania.
