= Mesocolpia peremptata =

Scientific classification
- Kingdom: Animalia
- Phylum: Arthropoda
- Class: Insecta
- Order: Lepidoptera
- Family: Geometridae
- Genus: Mesocolpia
- Species: M. peremptata

Binomial name
- Mesocolpia peremptata (Walker, 1862)

Synonyms
- Larentia peremptata Walker, 1862; Chloroclystis peremptata

Species of moth

Mesocolpia peremptata is a moth in the family Geometridae. It is found in Cameroon, the Democratic Republic of Congo, Equatorial Guinea (Bioko), Ivory Coast, Senegal and Sierra Leone.
