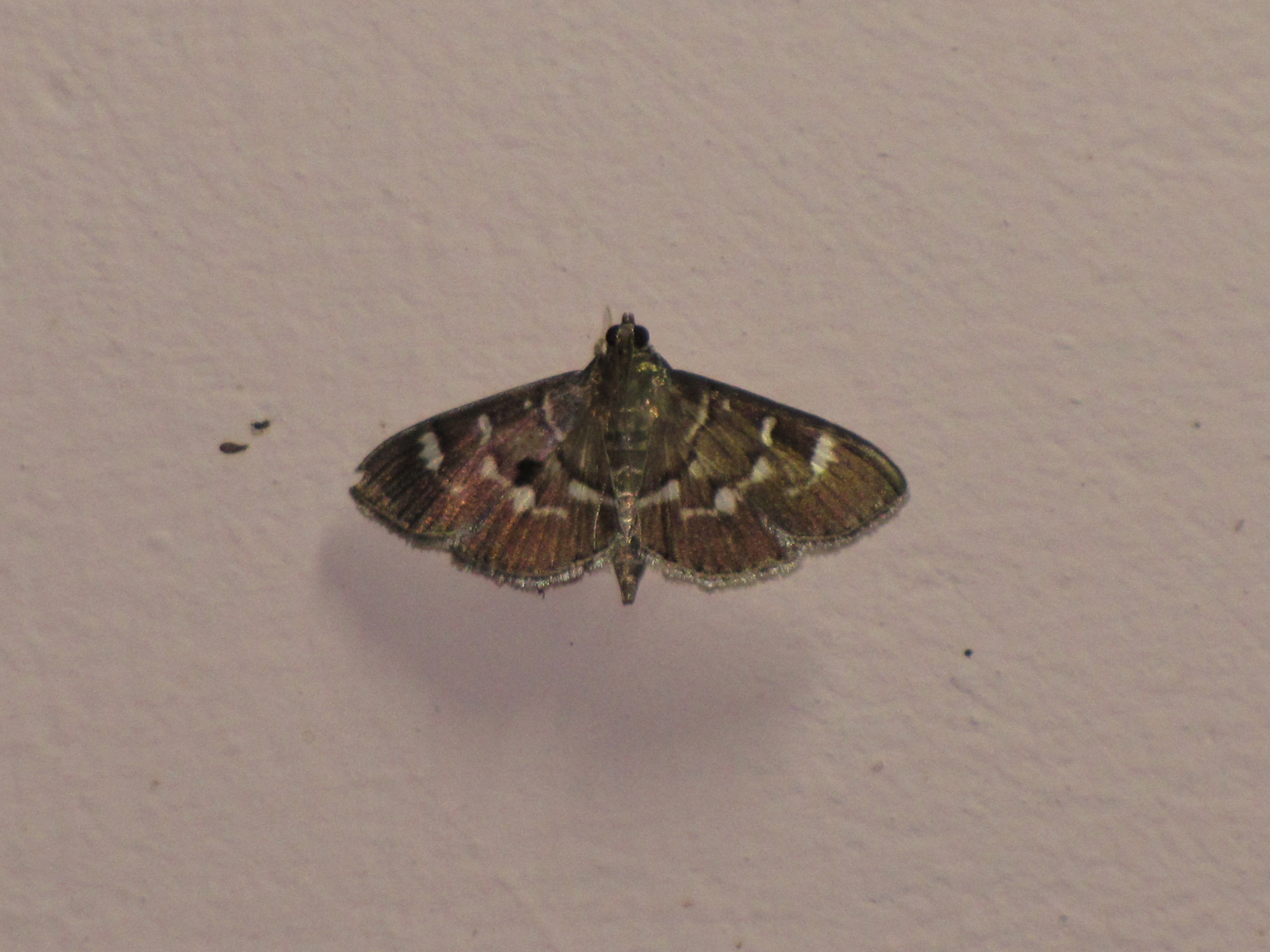
- Pardomima distorta

Scientific classification
- Kingdom: Animalia
- Phylum: Arthropoda
- Class: Insecta
- Order: Lepidoptera
- Family: Crambidae
- Subfamily: Spilomelinae
- Genus: Pardomima; Warren, 1890

Synonyms
- Pachyparda E. L. Martin, 1955

= Pardomima =

Genus of moths

Pardomima is a genus of moths of the family Crambidae described by Warren in 1890.

== Species ==
- Pardomima amyntusalis (Walker, 1859)
- Pardomima azancla Martin, 1955
- Pardomima callixantha E. L. Martin, 1955
- Pardomima distortana Strand, 1913
- Pardomima furcirenalis (Hampson, 1918)
- Pardomima margarodes Martin, 1955
- Pardomima martinalis Viette, 1957
- Pardomima phaeoparda Martin, 1955
- Pardomima phalaromima (Meyrick, 1933)
- Pardomima phalarota (Meyrick, 1933)
- Pardomima pompusalis (Walker, 1859)
- Pardomima telanepsia Martin, 1955
- Pardomima testudinalis (Saalmüller, 1880)
- Pardomima viettealis Martin, 1956
- Pardomima zanclophora E. L. Martin, 1955

== Former species ==
- Pardomima tumidipes (Hampson, 1912)
