= Agathodes bibundalis =

Scientific classification
- Kingdom: Animalia
- Phylum: Arthropoda
- Clade: Pancrustacea
- Class: Insecta
- Order: Lepidoptera
- Family: Crambidae
- Subfamily: Spilomelinae
- Tribe: Margaroniini
- Genus: Agathodes
- Species: A. bibundalis

Binomial name
- Agathodes bibundalis Strand, 1913

Species of moth

Agathodes bibundalis is a moth in the family Crambidae. It was described by Strand in 1913. It is found in Cameroon.
