= Pardomima testudinalis =

Scientific classification
- Kingdom: Animalia
- Phylum: Arthropoda
- Clade: Pancrustacea
- Class: Insecta
- Order: Lepidoptera
- Family: Crambidae
- Genus: Pardomima
- Species: P. testudinalis

Binomial name
- Pardomima testudinalis (Saalmüller, 1880)

Synonyms
- Glyphodes testudinalis Saalmüller, 1880

Species of moth

Pardomima testudinalis is a moth of the family Crambidae. It is found in Madagascar.

This species has a wingspan of approx. 24 mm with triangular forewings.
