= Eutelia furcata =

Florida eutelia moth

Scientific classification
- Kingdom: Animalia
- Phylum: Arthropoda
- Class: Insecta
- Order: Lepidoptera
- Superfamily: Noctuoidea
- Family: Euteliidae
- Genus: Eutelia
- Species: E. furcata

Binomial name
- Eutelia furcata (Walker, 1865)

Synonyms
- Eurhipia blandula Herrich-Schäffer, 1868; Eutelia blandula; Eutelia piratica Schaus, 1940; Eutelia pertanda Dyar, 1925; Eutelia distracta Walker, 1865; Eutelia nattereri Druce, 1898

Species of moth

Eutelia furcata, the Florida eutelia moth, is a moth of the family Noctuidae. The species was first described by Francis Walker in 1865. It is found from the southern United States (including Arizona, Texas and Florida) to Mexico, Cuba, Puerto Rico and Central America.

The wingspan is about 30 mm.
