= Agathodes caliginosalis =

Scientific classification
- Kingdom: Animalia
- Phylum: Arthropoda
- Clade: Pancrustacea
- Class: Insecta
- Order: Lepidoptera
- Family: Crambidae
- Subfamily: Spilomelinae
- Tribe: Margaroniini
- Genus: Agathodes
- Species: A. caliginosalis

Binomial name
- Agathodes caliginosalis Snellen, 1895

Species of moth

Agathodes caliginosalis is a moth in the family Crambidae. It was described by Snellen in 1895. It is found on Java.
