= Paschiodes =

Scientific classification
- Domain: Eukaryota
- Kingdom: Animalia
- Phylum: Arthropoda
- Class: Insecta
- Order: Lepidoptera
- Family: Crambidae
- Subfamily: Pyraustinae
- Genus: Paschiodes; Hampson, 1913

Synonyms
- Xanthelectris Meyrick, 1938

Genus of moths

Paschiodes is a genus of moths of the family Crambidae.

== Species ==
- Paschiodes aethiopicalis (Hampson, 1913)
- Paschiodes mesoleucalis Hampson, 1913
- Paschiodes okuensis Maes, 2000
- Paschiodes scoparialis (Viette, 1957)
- Paschiodes thomealis Viette, 1957
- Paschiodes ugandae Maes, 2005
