= Eutelia favillatrix =

Scientific classification
- Kingdom: Animalia
- Phylum: Arthropoda
- Class: Insecta
- Order: Lepidoptera
- Superfamily: Noctuoidea
- Family: Euteliidae
- Genus: Eutelia
- Species: E. favillatrix

Binomial name
- Eutelia favillatrix (Walker, 1858)

Synonyms
- Eurhipia favillatrixWalker, 1858

Species of moth

Eutelia favillatrix is a moth of the family Noctuidae. It is found in Ethiopia, Kenya and Zimbabwe.
