= Podomachla usambarae =

Scientific classification
- Kingdom: Animalia
- Phylum: Arthropoda
- Class: Insecta
- Order: Lepidoptera
- Superfamily: Noctuoidea
- Family: Erebidae
- Subfamily: Arctiinae
- Genus: Podomachla
- Species: P. usambarae

Binomial name
- Podomachla usambarae (Oberthür, 1893)

Synonyms
- Nyctemera usambarae Oberthür, 1893

Species of moth

Podomachla usambarae is a moth of the family Erebidae. It is found in Tanzania.
