= Lobesia virulenta =

Scientific classification
- Kingdom: Animalia
- Phylum: Arthropoda
- Clade: Pancrustacea
- Class: Insecta
- Order: Lepidoptera
- Family: Tortricidae
- Genus: Lobesia
- Species: L. virulenta

Binomial name
- Lobesia virulenta Bae & Komai, 1991

Species of moth

Lobesia virulenta is a moth of the family Tortricidae. It was described by Bae & Komai in 1991. It is found from northern Europe to Japan (Hokkaido, Honshu, Shikoku).

== Subspecies ==
- Lobesia virulenta virulenta (Japan)
- Lobesia virulenta mieana Falck & Karsholt, 1998 (Europe)
