= Pardomima callixantha =

Scientific classification
- Kingdom: Animalia
- Phylum: Arthropoda
- Class: Insecta
- Order: Lepidoptera
- Family: Crambidae
- Genus: Pardomima
- Species: P. callixantha

Binomial name
- Pardomima callixantha E. L. Martin, 1955

Species of moth

Pardomima callixantha is a moth in the family Crambidae. It was described by Edward L. Martin in 1955. It is found in Mali, Angola, the Democratic Republic of the Congo (Katanga), Ethiopia, Ghana, Ivory Coast, Kenya, Malawi, South Africa (KwaZulu-Natal, Gauteng), Sudan, Zambia and Zimbabwe.
