= Podomachla acraeina =

Scientific classification
- Domain: Eukaryota
- Kingdom: Animalia
- Phylum: Arthropoda
- Class: Insecta
- Order: Lepidoptera
- Superfamily: Noctuoidea
- Family: Erebidae
- Subfamily: Arctiinae
- Genus: Podomachla
- Species: P. acraeina

Binomial name
- Podomachla acraeina (H. Druce, 1882)

Synonyms
- Nyctemera acraeina H. Druce, 1882; Deilemera acraeina togoensis Strand, 1909; Deilemera acraeina H. Druce ab. pulverata Strand, 1909; Deilemera acraeina H. Druce ab. auricolens Strand, 1909; Deilemera acraeina H. Druce ab. transitoria Strand, 1909

Species of moth

Podomachla acraeina is a moth of the family Erebidae first described by Herbert Druce in 1882. It is found in Cameroon, Equatorial Guinea, Ghana, Nigeria, Sierra Leone and Togo.

== Subspecies ==
- Podomachla acraeina acraeina
- Podomachla acraeina togoensis (Strand, 1909) (Togo)
