= Eutelia catephioides =

Scientific classification
- Kingdom: Animalia
- Phylum: Arthropoda
- Class: Insecta
- Order: Lepidoptera
- Superfamily: Noctuoidea
- Family: Euteliidae
- Genus: Eutelia
- Species: E. catephioides

Binomial name
- Eutelia catephioides (Guenée, 1852)

Synonyms
- Phlegetonia catephioides Guenée, 1852

Species of moth

Eutelia catephioides is a moth of the family Noctuidae. It is found in South Africa, Ethiopia and Saudi Arabia.
