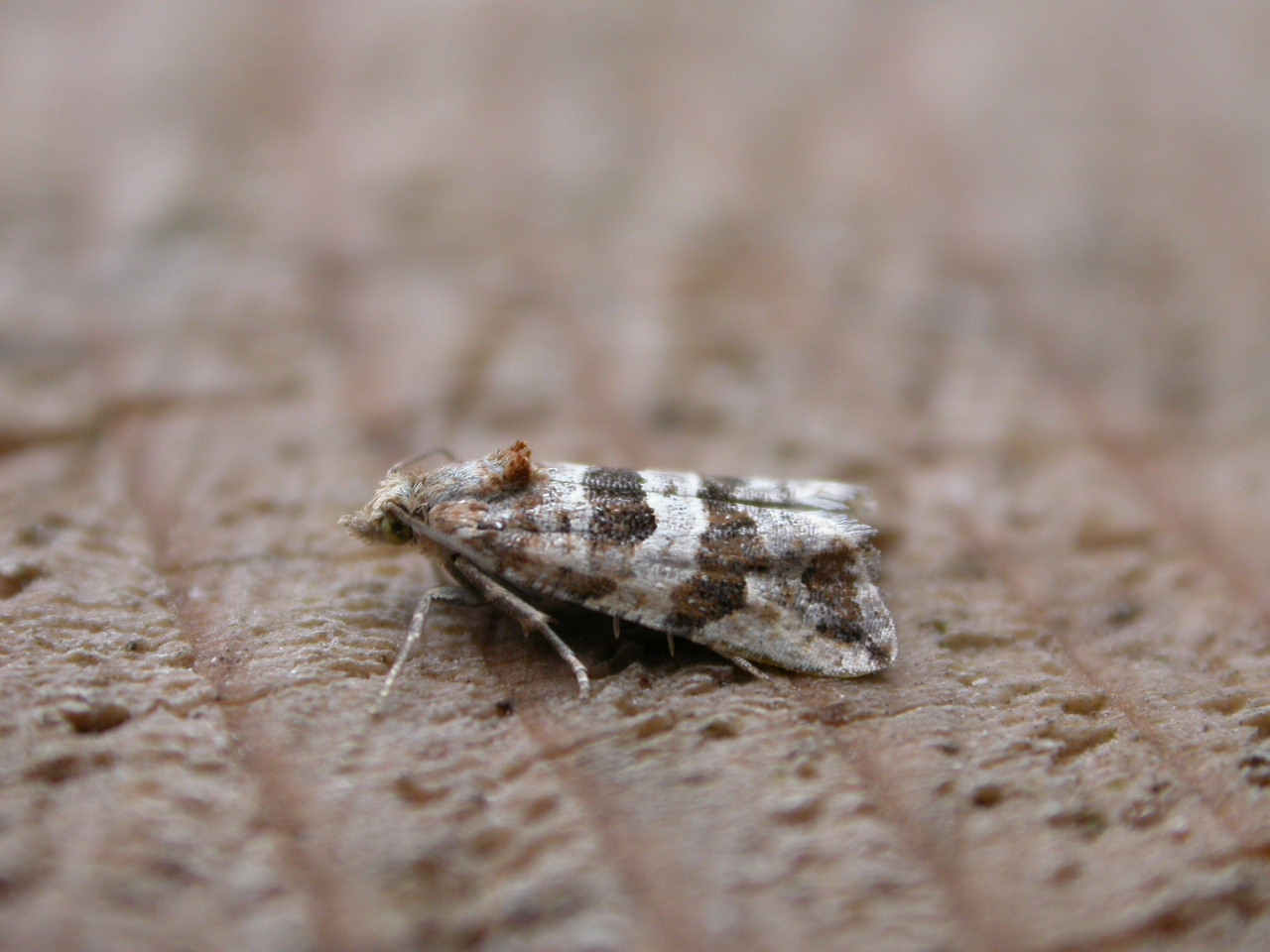

Scientific classification
- Kingdom: Animalia
- Phylum: Arthropoda
- Class: Insecta
- Order: Lepidoptera
- Family: Tortricidae
- Genus: Lobesia
- Species: L. littoralis

Binomial name
- Lobesia littoralis (Westwood & Humphreys, 1845)

= Lobesia littoralis =

Species of moth

Lobesia littoralis is a moth of the family Tortricidae. It is distributed wherever thrift (Armeria maritima) and birds-foot trefoil (Lotus corniculatus) occur around the coasts of Europe, including the Faroes, Iceland and St Kilda.

== Life history ==
The wingspan is 11–16 mm. The forewings are elongate, narrow, ochreous or pale greyish-ochreous, sometimes rosy tinged and faintly striated. The basal patch is a deeper colour or ferruginous, the edge is angulated and it is black-marked near the dorsum. The narrow central fascia, and the terminal fascia are narrowed to both extremities and again a deeper colour or ferruginous and sometimes partially black -marked. The hindwings are pale grey, terminally darker. The larva is pale greenish-grey, or sometimes dark brown; head light brown; plate of 2 black.

Adults are on wing from late-May to October and there are two generations per year which fly in late afternoon sun and come to light. They can be found on rocky coastlines, saltmarshes, vegetated shingle and gardens.

The larvae feed on thrift (Armeria maritima), or birds-foot trefoil (Lotus corniculatus). The first generation larvae feed on unripe seeds in the flowerheads or in young shoots, spinning a silken tube among the leaves. Second generation feed on seeds in the dead flowerheads.

The light olive-brown pupa can be found in a strong, white silken cocoon in a flowerhead or among the leaves of the foodplant.
