= Agathodes designalis =

Scientific classification
- Kingdom: Animalia
- Phylum: Arthropoda
- Clade: Pancrustacea
- Class: Insecta
- Order: Lepidoptera
- Family: Crambidae
- Subfamily: Spilomelinae
- Tribe: Margaroniini
- Genus: Agathodes
- Species: A. designalis

Binomial name
- Agathodes designalis Guenée, 1854

Synonyms
- Stenurges floridalis Hulst, 1886

Species of moth

Agathodes designalis, the sky-pointing moth, is a moth in the family Crambidae. It was described by Achille Guenée in 1854. It lives in Arizona, Texas, Florida, southern South America and the West Indies.

The length of the forewings is 13-18.5 mm. Adults are on wing from May to September in four generations in Florida.

The larvae feed on Erythrina (including Erythrina flabelliformis), Inga and Citharexylum species. The summer and fall generations feed on the leaves of their host plant, while larvae of the spring generation feed on the flowers.

== Subspecies ==
- Agathodes designalis designalis
- Agathodes designalis monstralis Guenée, 1854 (Mexico, West Indies)
