= Podomachla arieticornis =

Scientific classification
- Kingdom: Animalia
- Phylum: Arthropoda
- Class: Insecta
- Order: Lepidoptera
- Superfamily: Noctuoidea
- Family: Erebidae
- Subfamily: Arctiinae
- Genus: Podomachla
- Species: P. arieticornis

Binomial name
- Podomachla arieticornis (Strand, 1909)

Synonyms
- Deilemera arieticornis Strand, 1909

Species of moth

Podomachla arieticornis is a moth of the family Erebidae. It is found in Cameroon.
