= Podomachla virgo =

Scientific classification
- Kingdom: Animalia
- Phylum: Arthropoda
- Clade: Pancrustacea
- Class: Insecta
- Order: Lepidoptera
- Superfamily: Noctuoidea
- Family: Erebidae
- Subfamily: Arctiinae
- Genus: Podomachla
- Species: P. virgo

Binomial name
- Podomachla virgo (Strand, 1909)

Synonyms
- Deilemera virgo Strand, 1909; Deilemera insularis proletaria Strand, 1909

Species of moth

Podomachla virgo is a moth of the family Erebidae. It is found on the Comoros, La Réunion and Madagascar.
