= Agathodes paliscia =

Scientific classification
- Kingdom: Animalia
- Phylum: Arthropoda
- Clade: Pancrustacea
- Class: Insecta
- Order: Lepidoptera
- Family: Crambidae
- Genus: Agathodes
- Species: A. paliscia

Binomial name
- Agathodes paliscia Turner, 1908

Species of moth

Agathodes paliscia is a moth in the family Crambidae. It was described by Turner in 1908. It is found in Australia, where it has been recorded from Queensland and Western Australia.

The wingspan is 28–34 mm. The forewings are pale-grey, with purple reflections and some dark-ochreous irroration. There is a pale linear discal mark, succeeded by a dark-ochreous suffusion, as well as a pale line from the costa outwards nearly to the termen, then bent to the dorsum. The disc beyond this is dark-ochreous and there is a fine white terminal line. The hindwings are pale-grey, but whitish towards the base.
