= Lobesia porrectana =

Scientific classification
- Kingdom: Animalia
- Phylum: Arthropoda
- Clade: Pancrustacea
- Class: Insecta
- Order: Lepidoptera
- Family: Tortricidae
- Genus: Lobesia
- Species: L. porrectana

Binomial name
- Lobesia porrectana (Zeller, 1847)

Synonyms
- Sericoris porrectana Zeller, 1847

Species of moth

Lobesia porrectana is a moth of the family Tortricidae. It was described by Zeller in 1847. It is found in France and Spain and on Corsica, Sardinia, Sicily and Malta.
