= Pardomima phaeoparda =

Scientific classification
- Kingdom: Animalia
- Phylum: Arthropoda
- Class: Insecta
- Order: Lepidoptera
- Family: Crambidae
- Genus: Pardomima
- Species: P. phaeoparda

Binomial name
- Pardomima phaeoparda E. L. Martin, 1955

Species of moth

Pardomima phaeoparda is a moth in the family Crambidae. It was described by Edward L. Martin in 1955. It is found in the Democratic Republic of the Congo (East Kasai), Ivory Coast, Nigeria and Sierra Leone.
