= Agathodes transiens =

Scientific classification
- Kingdom: Animalia
- Phylum: Arthropoda
- Clade: Pancrustacea
- Class: Insecta
- Order: Lepidoptera
- Family: Crambidae
- Genus: Agathodes
- Species: A. transiens

Binomial name
- Agathodes transiens Munroe, 1960

Species of moth

Agathodes transiens is a moth in the family Crambidae. It was described by Eugene G. Munroe in 1960. It is found in Bolivia.
