= Agathodes rebeli =

Scientific classification
- Kingdom: Animalia
- Phylum: Arthropoda
- Clade: Pancrustacea
- Class: Insecta
- Order: Lepidoptera
- Family: Crambidae
- Genus: Agathodes
- Species: A. rebeli

Binomial name
- Agathodes rebeli Tams, 1935

Species of moth

Agathodes rebeli is a moth in the family Crambidae. It was described by Willie Horace Thomas Tams in 1935. It is found on Samoa.
