= Pardomima amyntusalis =

Scientific classification
- Kingdom: Animalia
- Phylum: Arthropoda
- Class: Insecta
- Order: Lepidoptera
- Family: Crambidae
- Genus: Pardomima
- Species: P. amyntusalis

Binomial name
- Pardomima amyntusalis (Walker, 1859)

Synonyms
- Botys amyntusalis Walker, 1859; Asopia critheisalis Walker, 1859; Botys semizebralis Walker, 1866; Entephria tabidialis Snellen, 1899

Species of moth

Pardomima amyntusalis is a moth in the family, Crambidae. It was described by Francis Walker in 1859. It is found in the Democratic Republic of the Congo (Equateur, Katanga), Ivory Coast, Kenya, Madagascar, Mozambique, Sierra Leone, Uganda, Zambia, Sri Lanka, India, Indonesia (Java), Myanmar and Australia, where it has been recorded from Western Australia.
