= Mesocolpia dexiphyma =

Scientific classification
- Kingdom: Animalia
- Phylum: Arthropoda
- Clade: Pancrustacea
- Class: Insecta
- Order: Lepidoptera
- Family: Geometridae
- Genus: Mesocolpia
- Species: M. dexiphyma

Binomial name
- Mesocolpia dexiphyma (Prout, 1937)

Synonyms
- Chloroclystis dexiphyma Prout, 1937

Species of moth

Mesocolpia dexiphyma is a moth in the family Geometridae. It is found on Príncipe.
