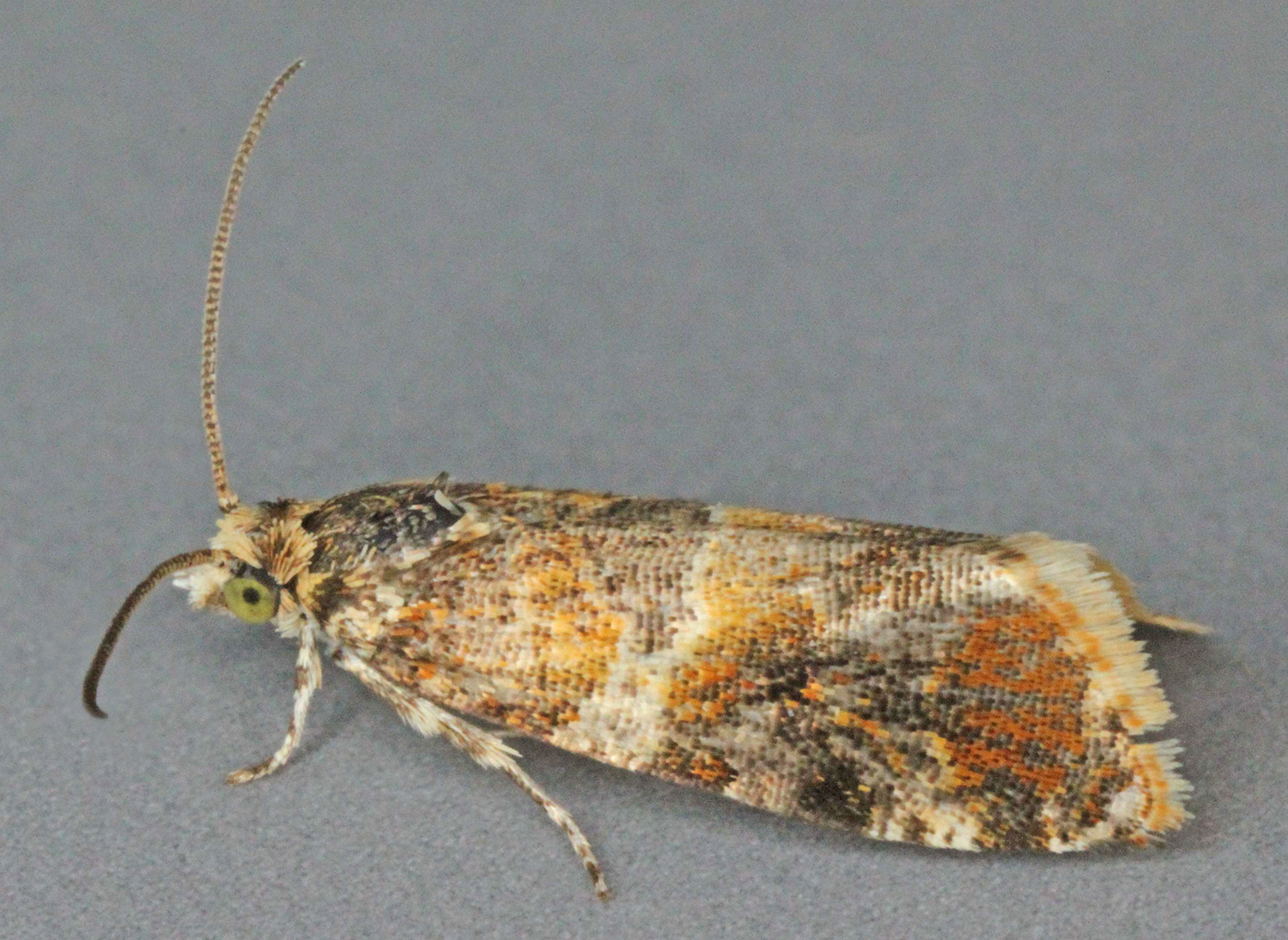
- Lobesia reliquana, Trawscoed, North Wales,

Scientific classification
- Kingdom: Animalia
- Phylum: Arthropoda
- Clade: Pancrustacea
- Class: Insecta
- Order: Lepidoptera
- Family: Tortricidae
- Genus: Lobesia
- Species: L. reliquana

Binomial name
- Lobesia reliquana (Hübner, 1825)

= Lobesia reliquana =

Species of moth

Lobesia reliquana is a moth belonging to the family Tortricidae. The species was first described by Jacob Hübner in 1825.

It is native to the Palearctic.

The wingspan is 12–14 mm. The ground color of the forewings is ochre with two oval, blue-grey spots at the dorsal edge, from each of which there is an irregular, wide, light cross-band to the costal edge. At the costa between the two cross-bands there is a large black spot with a light core, this can also extend outside the outer cross-band. The hindwings are light grey-brown.

The moth flies in May–June.

This species lives in deciduous forests where the larvae develop between tangled leaves on Quercus spp., occasionally Betula or other deciduous trees.
