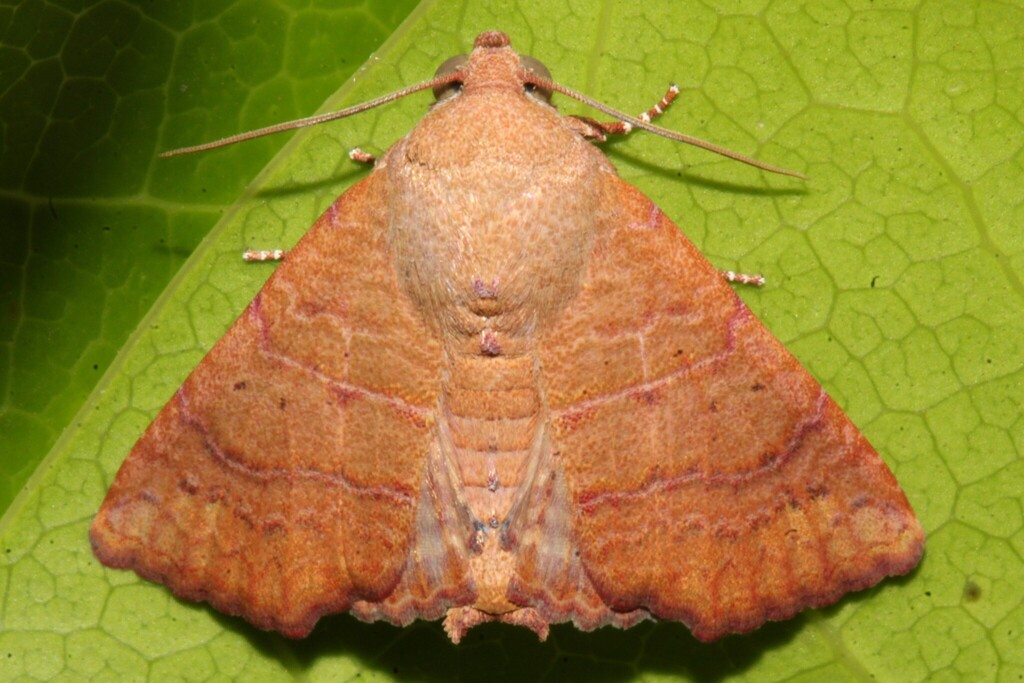
- Eutelia polychorda

Scientific classification
- Kingdom: Animalia
- Phylum: Arthropoda
- Clade: Pancrustacea
- Class: Insecta
- Order: Lepidoptera
- Superfamily: Noctuoidea
- Family: Euteliidae
- Genus: Eutelia
- Species: E. polychorda

Binomial name
- Eutelia polychorda Hampson, 1902

= Eutelia polychorda =

Species of moth

Eutelia polychorda is a species of moth in the family Euteliidae.. It was described by Sir George Francis Hampson, 10th Baronet, in 1902. This species is found in most of Africa.
