= Eutelia pyrastis =

Scientific classification
- Kingdom: Animalia
- Phylum: Arthropoda
- Class: Insecta
- Order: Lepidoptera
- Superfamily: Noctuoidea
- Family: Euteliidae
- Genus: Eutelia
- Species: E. pyrastis

Binomial name
- Eutelia pyrastis Hampson, 1905

Species of moth

Eutelia pyrastis is a species of moth in the family Euteliidae. It is found in the Caribbean Sea and North America.

The MONA or Hodges number for Eutelia pyrastis is 8968.1.
