= Agathodes musivalis =

Scientific classification
- Kingdom: Animalia
- Phylum: Arthropoda
- Class: Insecta
- Order: Lepidoptera
- Family: Crambidae
- Genus: Agathodes
- Species: A. musivalis

Binomial name
- Agathodes musivalis Guenée, 1854

Synonyms
- Agathodes chrysalis Hampson, 1908

Species of moth

Agathodes musivalis is a species of moth of the family Crambidae described by Achille Guenée in 1854. It is found in Mayotte, Congo, Kenya, Réunion, Malawi, Mauritius, Madagascar, Mozambique, Somalia, South Africa, Uganda, Zambia and Zimbabwe.

The larvae have been recorded feeding on Erythrina indica and Erythrina afra (Fabaceae).

The common name is painted pearl.
