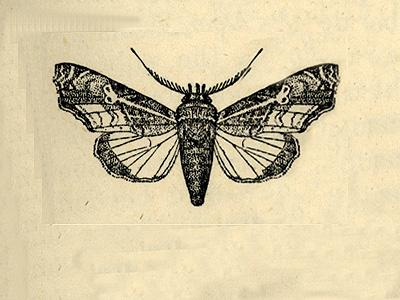

Scientific classification
- Kingdom: Animalia
- Phylum: Arthropoda
- Class: Insecta
- Order: Lepidoptera
- Superfamily: Noctuoidea
- Family: Euteliidae
- Genus: Eutelia
- Species: E. ablatrix

Binomial name
- Eutelia ablatrix (Guenee, 1852)

Synonyms
- Penicillaria ablatrix Guenee, 1852; Penicillaria rufatrix Walker, 1858

= Eutelia ablatrix =

Species of moth

Eutelia ablatrix is a moth of the family Noctuidae. It is found from Central America to Paraguay and on the Antilles.
