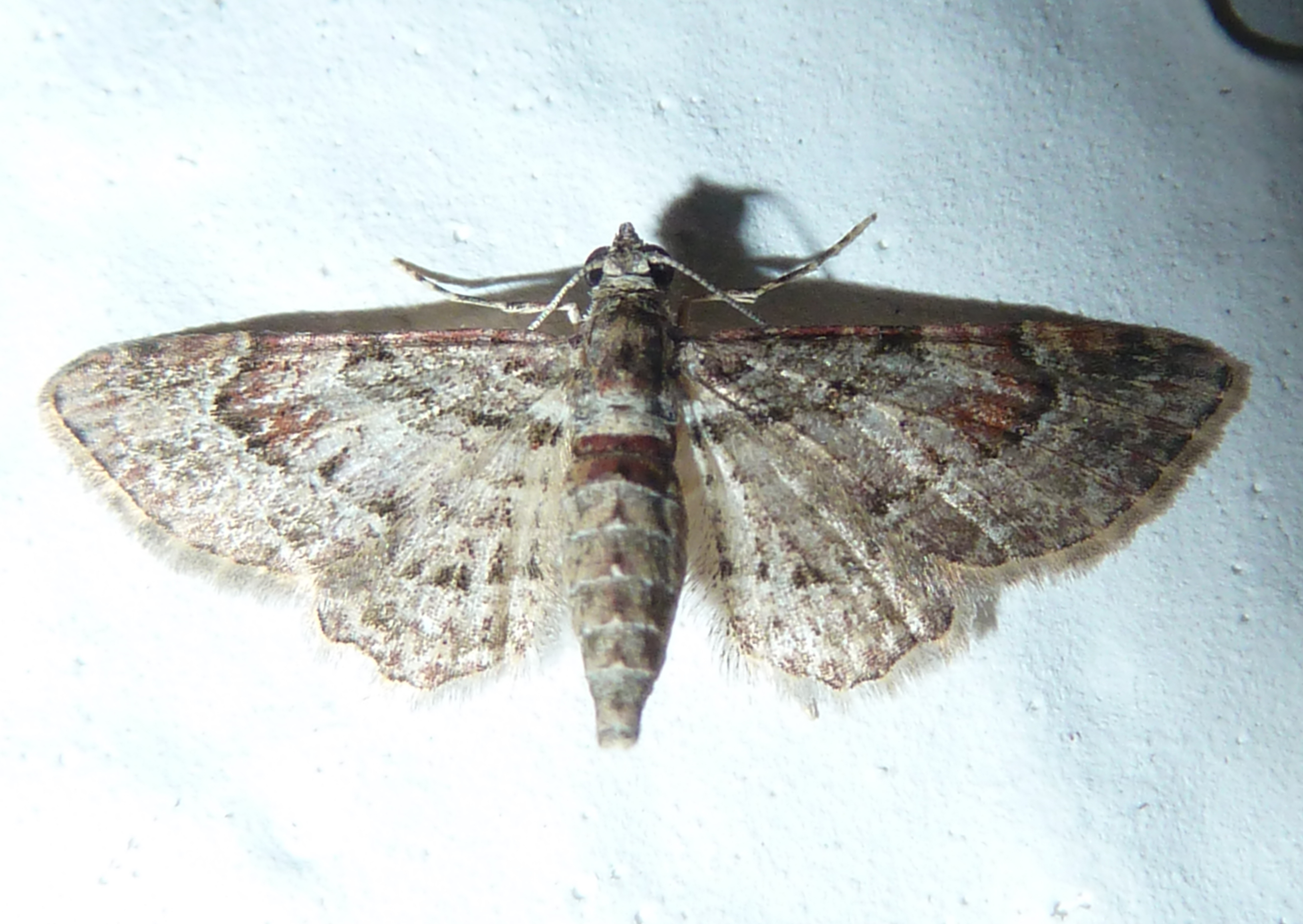
- Mesocolpia sp. in South Africa

Scientific classification
- Domain: Eukaryota
- Kingdom: Animalia
- Phylum: Arthropoda
- Class: Insecta
- Order: Lepidoptera
- Family: Geometridae
- Tribe: Eupitheciini
- Genus: Mesocolpia; Warren, 1901

= Mesocolpia =

Genus of moths

Mesocolpia is a genus of moths in the family Geometridae.

== Species ==
- Mesocolpia consobrina (Warren, 1901)
- Mesocolpia dexiphyma (Prout, 1937)
- Mesocolpia marmorata (Warren, 1899)
- Mesocolpia nanula (Mabille, 1900)
- Mesocolpia peremptata (Walker, 1862)
- Mesocolpia protrusata (Warren, 1902)
- Mesocolpia subcomosa Warren, 1901

== Former species ==
- Mesocolpia lita (Prout, 1916) was recently transferred to Pasiphila
