= Eulophonotus obesus =

Scientific classification
- Kingdom: Animalia
- Phylum: Arthropoda
- Class: Insecta
- Order: Lepidoptera
- Family: Cossidae
- Genus: Eulophonotus
- Species: E. obesus

Binomial name
- Eulophonotus obesus (Karsch, 1900)

Synonyms
- Engyophlebus obesus Karsch, 1900

Species of moth

Eulophonotus obesus is a moth in the family Cossidae. It is found in Sierra Leone and Togo.
