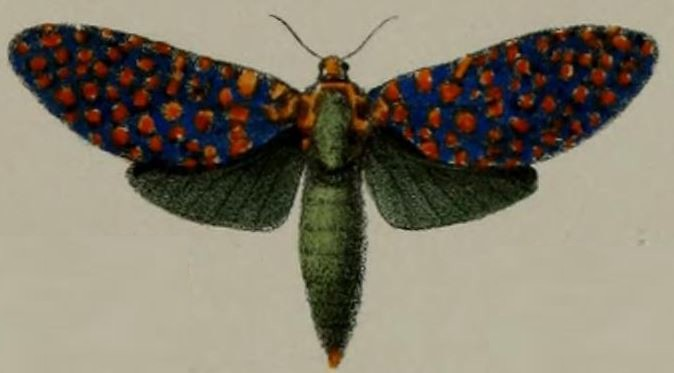
- Eulophonotus stephania

Scientific classification
- Kingdom: Animalia
- Phylum: Arthropoda
- Class: Insecta
- Order: Lepidoptera
- Family: Cossidae
- Subfamily: Zeuzerinae
- Genus: Eulophonotus; Felder, 1874

Synonyms
- Callocossus Aurivillius, 1910; Engyophlebus Karsch, 1900; Zeuzerops Strand, 1910

= Eulophonotus =

Moth genus in family Cossidae

Eulophonotus is a genus of moths in the family Cossidae endemic to sub-Saharan Africa.

== Species ==
- Eulophonotus armstrongi (Hampson, 1914)
- Eulophonotus congoensis (Strand)
- Eulophonotus elegans (Aurivillius, 1910)
- Eulophonotus hyalinipennis (Strand, 1910)
- Eulophonotus myrmeleon Felder, 1874
- Eulophonotus nigrodiscalis Yakovlev, 2011
- Eulophonotus obesus (Karsch, 1900)
- Eulophonotus stephania (Druce, 1887)
