= Agathodes isabella =

Scientific classification
- Kingdom: Animalia
- Phylum: Arthropoda
- Clade: Pancrustacea
- Class: Insecta
- Order: Lepidoptera
- Family: Crambidae
- Genus: Agathodes
- Species: A. isabella

Binomial name
- Agathodes isabella Viette, 1989

Species of moth

Agathodes isabella is a moth in the family Crambidae. It was described by Viette in 1989. It is found in Madagascar.
