= Mesocolpia protrusata =

Scientific classification
- Domain: Eukaryota
- Kingdom: Animalia
- Phylum: Arthropoda
- Class: Insecta
- Order: Lepidoptera
- Family: Geometridae
- Genus: Mesocolpia
- Species: M. protrusata

Binomial name
- Mesocolpia protrusata (Warren, 1902)

Synonyms
- Chloroclystis protrusata Warren, 1902

Species of moth

Mesocolpia protrusata is a moth in the family Geometridae. It is found in Kenya and Uganda.
