= Paschiodes okuensis =

Scientific classification
- Domain: Eukaryota
- Kingdom: Animalia
- Phylum: Arthropoda
- Class: Insecta
- Order: Lepidoptera
- Family: Crambidae
- Genus: Paschiodes
- Species: P. okuensis

Binomial name
- Paschiodes okuensis Maes, 2000

Species of moth

Paschiodes okuensis is a moth in the family Crambidae. It was described by Koen V. N. Maes in 2000. It is found in Cameroon.
