= Agathodes incoloralis =

Scientific classification
- Kingdom: Animalia
- Phylum: Arthropoda
- Clade: Pancrustacea
- Class: Insecta
- Order: Lepidoptera
- Family: Crambidae
- Genus: Agathodes
- Species: A. incoloralis

Binomial name
- Agathodes incoloralis (Hampson, 1918)

Synonyms
- Liopasia incoloralis Hampson, 1918

Species of moth

Agathodes incoloralis is a moth in the family Crambidae. It was described by George Hampson in 1918. It is found in Kenya and Zambia.
