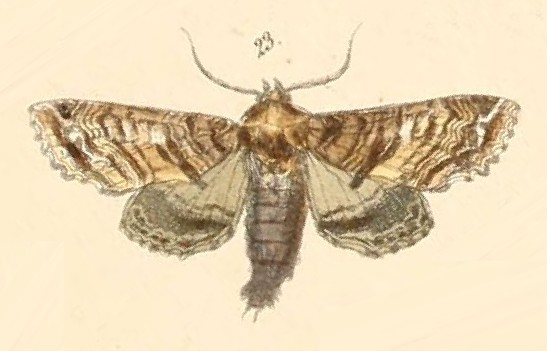

Scientific classification
- Domain: Eukaryota
- Kingdom: Animalia
- Phylum: Arthropoda
- Class: Insecta
- Order: Lepidoptera
- Superfamily: Noctuoidea
- Family: Euteliidae
- Genus: Eutelia
- Species: E. geyeri

Binomial name
- Eutelia geyeri (R. Felder & Rogenhofer, 1874)

Synonyms
- Eurhipia geyeri R. Felder & Rogenhofer, 1874; Eutelia inextricata Moore, 1882

= Eutelia geyeri =

Species of moth

Eutelia geyeri is a moth of the family Euteliidae first described by Rudolf Felder and Alois Friedrich Rogenhofer in 1874. This species is found in India, Sri Lanka, China and Japan, as well as from Africa, where its presence had been reported from Lesotho and Seychelles.

== Description ==
This species has a wingspan of 35–39 mm. Forewings with crenulate cilia. Head and collar chestnut colored, whereas thorax dark red-brown, with white lines. Abdomen fuscous with rufous dorsal marks on first segment, then some long white hair and rufous tufts on distal segments, some lateral rufous marks also can be seen. Forewings are pale brownish with white suffusion and curved white lines found on basal area. Reniform with white outline. Three sinuous postmedial lines excurved beyond cell, and the inner with crimson below costa and at middle and metallic green at inner margin. The two outer lines with orange spots at inner margin. Outer margin has a series of black specks and metallic-green spot at center, with some crimson below it. Hindwings with semi-hyaline white basal area and fuscous outer area with a white streak at anal angle, and a marginal series of dark stria.
