= Eulophonotus congoensis =

Scientific classification
- Kingdom: Animalia
- Phylum: Arthropoda
- Class: Insecta
- Order: Lepidoptera
- Family: Cossidae
- Genus: Eulophonotus
- Species: E. congoensis

Binomial name
- Eulophonotus congoensis (Strand)

Species of moth

Eulophonotus congoensis is a moth in the family Cossidae. It is found in the Democratic Republic of Congo.
