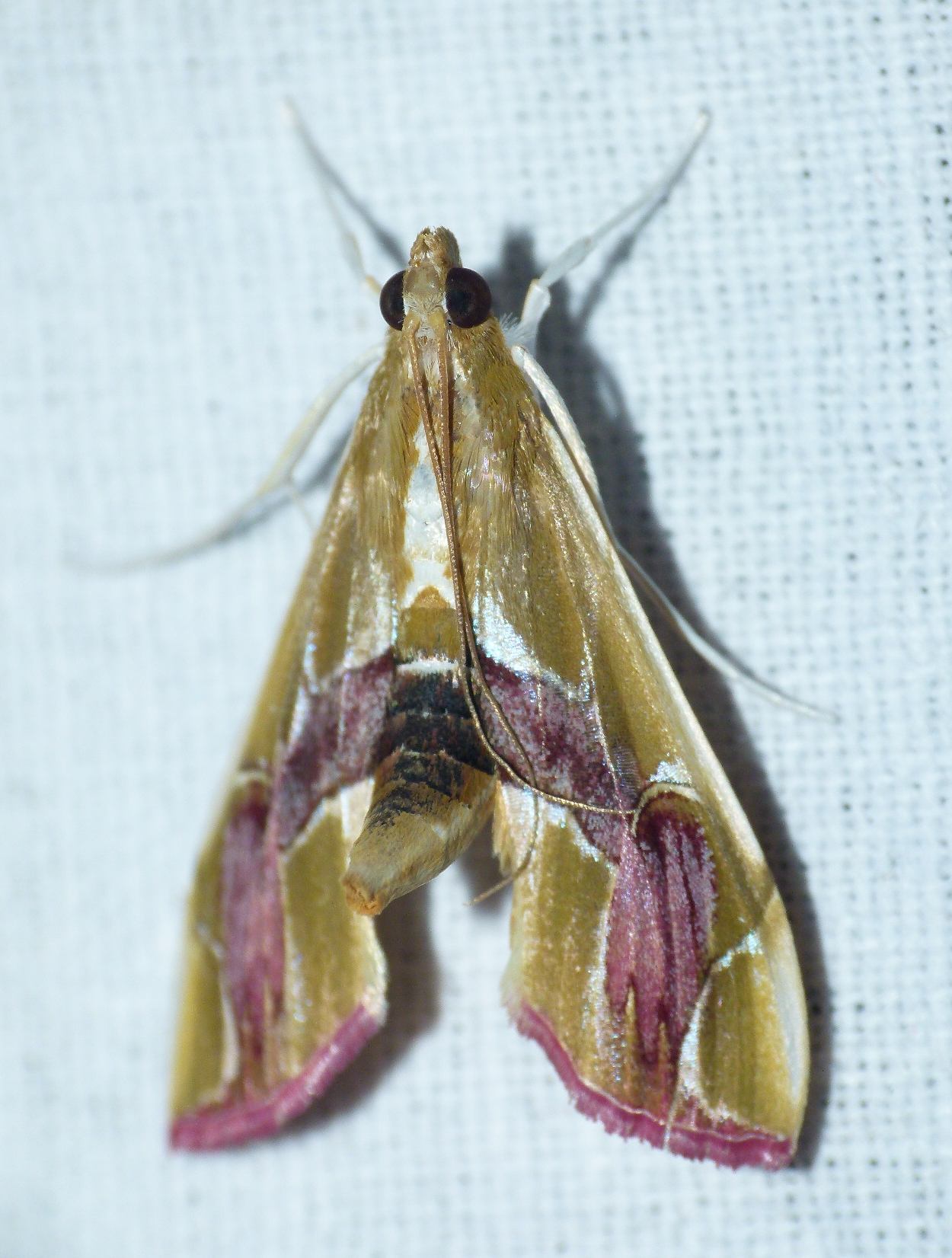

Scientific classification
- Kingdom: Animalia
- Phylum: Arthropoda
- Class: Insecta
- Order: Lepidoptera
- Family: Crambidae
- Genus: Agathodes
- Species: A. ostentalis

Binomial name
- Agathodes ostentalis (Geyer, 1837)

Synonyms
- Perinephela ostentalis Geyer, 1837; Agathodes pallidior E. Hering, 1901; Agathodes ostensalis Guenée, 1854

= Agathodes ostentalis =

Species of moth

Agathodes ostentalis, the coral tree moth, is a species of moth of the family Crambidae described by Carl Geyer in 1837. It is found from India to Indonesia, including Hong Kong, Japan, Thailand and in Australia in New South Wales and Queensland.

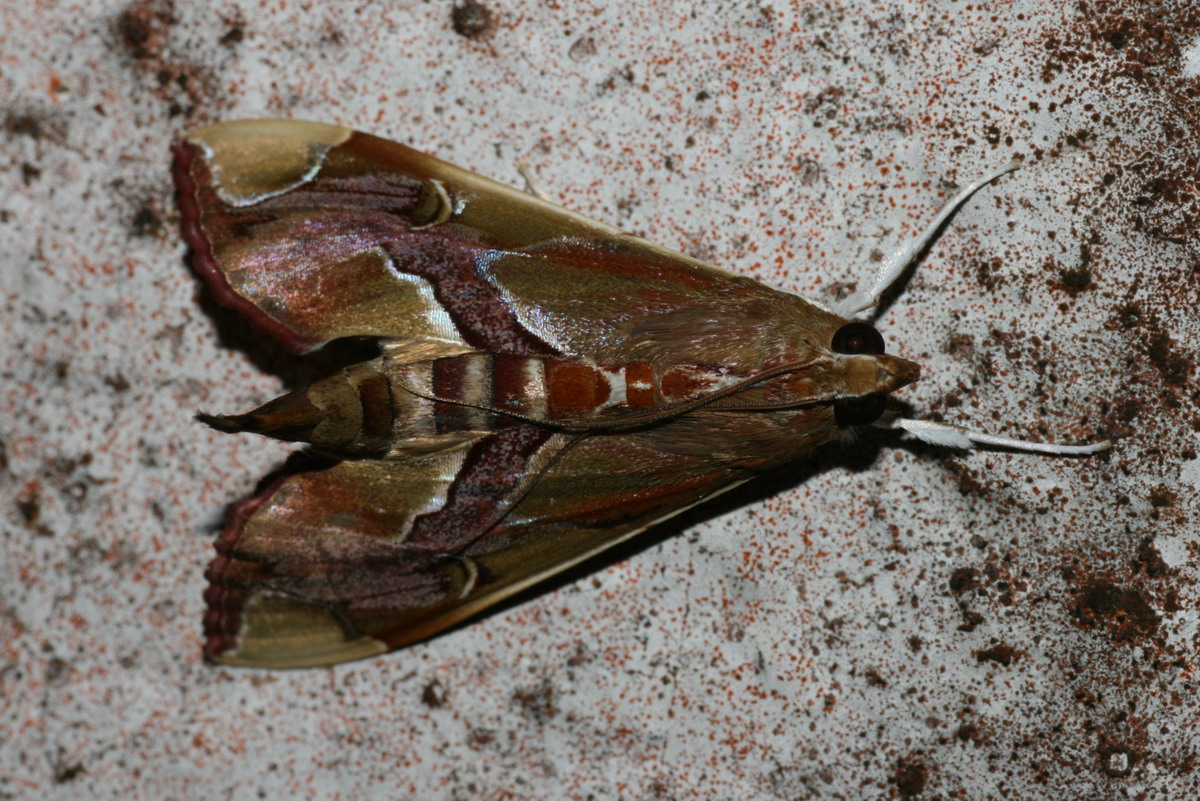

The wingspan is about 25 mm.

The larvae have been recorded feeding on the foliage Erythrina indica and Erythrina vespertillio.
