= Agathodes modicalis =

Scientific classification
- Kingdom: Animalia
- Phylum: Arthropoda
- Clade: Pancrustacea
- Class: Insecta
- Order: Lepidoptera
- Family: Crambidae
- Genus: Agathodes
- Species: A. modicalis

Binomial name
- Agathodes modicalis Guenée, 1854

Synonyms
- Agathodes sumatralis Swinhoe, 1906; Megaphysa integralis Walker, 1866

Species of moth

Agathodes modicalis is a moth in the family Crambidae. It was described by Achille Guenée in 1854. It is found in India, Indonesia (Java, Sumatra) and in South Africa (KwaZulu-Natal).
