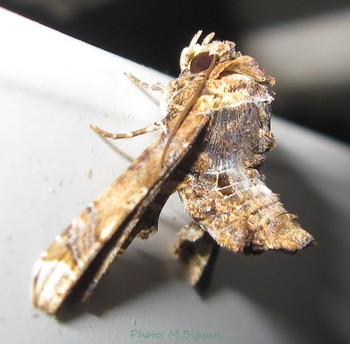
- Eutelia blandiatrix

Scientific classification
- Kingdom: Animalia
- Phylum: Arthropoda
- Clade: Pancrustacea
- Class: Insecta
- Order: Lepidoptera
- Superfamily: Noctuoidea
- Family: Euteliidae
- Subfamily: Euteliinae
- Genus: Eutelia; Hübner, 1823

Synonyms
- Eutesia Hübner, 1826 1816; Eurhipia Boisduval, 1828; Phlegetonia Guenée, 1852; Ripogenus Grote, 1865; Zobia Saalmüller, 1891; Targallodes Holland, 1894; Alotsa Swinhoe, 1900; Silacida Swinhoe, 1900; Noctasota Clench, 1954; Adoraria Beck, 1996; Alotoa Leraut, 1997

= Eutelia =

Genus of moths

Eutelia is a genus of moths of the family Euteliidae erected by Jacob Hübner in 1823.

== Description ==
Palpi upturned, reaching just above vertex of head. Thorax smoothly scaled. Abdomen typically stout with a pair of anal tufts and extremely slight dorsal tufts on medial segments. Forewing with nearly straight costa, rectangular apex, obliquely curved outer margin and near base lobed inner margin.

== Species ==
- Eutelia ablatrix (Guenée, 1852)
- Eutelia adoratrix Staudinger, 1892
- Eutelia adulatricoides Mell, 1943
- Eutelia adulatrix Hübner, 1813
- Eutelia albiluna Hampson, 1905
- Eutelia amatrix Walker, 1858
- Eutelia blandiatrix (Guenée, 1852)
- Eutelia bouveti Viette, 1984
- Eutelia bowkeri (Felder & Rogenhofer, 1874)
- Eutelia callichroma (Distant, 1901)
- Eutelia caustiplaga Hampson, 1905
- Eutelia catephioides (Guenée, 1852)
- Eutelia cautabasis Hampson, 1905
- Eutelia chlorobasis Hampson, 1905
- Eutelia discedens Hacker & Fibiger, 2006
- Eutelia discitriga Walker, 1865
- Eutelia distorta Hampson, 1912
- Eutelia discitriga Walker, 1865
- Eutelia endoleuca (Hampson, 1918)
- Eutelia exquisita Saalmüller, 1891
- Eutelia favillatrix (Guenée, 1852)
- Eutelia ferridorsata Hampson, 1905
- Eutelia fulvigrisea Warren, 1914
- Eutelia furcata Walker, 1865
- Eutelia gabriela Hampson, 1912
- Eutelia gaedei Hacker & Fibiger, 2006
- Eutelia galleyi Viette, 1984
- Eutelia geraea Hampson, 1905
- Eutelia geyeri (Felder & Rogenhofer, 1874)
- Eutelia gilvicolor Mabille, 1900
- Eutelia glaucocycla Hampson, 1912
- Eutelia grisescens Hampson, 1916
- Eutelia griveaudi Viette, 1979
- Eutelia guerouti Laporte, 1970
- Eutelia hayesi Laporte, 1970
- Eutelia histrio (Saalmüller, 1880)
- Eutelia holocausta Hampson, 1905
- Eutelia leighi Hampson, 1905
- Eutelia leucodelta Hampson, 1905
- Eutelia malanga Bethune-Baker, 1911
- Eutelia megacycla Berio, 1957
- Eutelia melanopis Hampson, 1905
- Eutelia menalcas (Holland, 1894)
- Eutelia mesogona Hampson, 1905
- Eutelia metasarca Hampson, 1905
- Eutelia mima A. E. Prout, 1925
- Eutelia morosa (Holland, 1894)
- Eutelia musicalis Berio, 1966
- Eutelia nigricans Holland, 1920
- Eutelia nigridentula Hampson, 1905
- Eutelia ocellaria Berio, 1966
- Eutelia ochricostata Hampson, 1905
- Eutelia ocularis (Saalmüller, 1891)
- Eutelia poliochroa Hampson, 1912
- Eutelia polychorda Hampson, 1902
- Eutelia porphyriota (Hampson, 1912)
- Eutelia pratti (Kenrick, 1917)
- Eutelia procera (Saalmüller, 1891)
- Eutelia pulcherrimus Grote, 1865 (alternative spelling Eutelia pulcherrima)
- Eutelia pyrastis Hampson, 1905
- Eutelia quadriliturata Walker, 1869
- Eutelia rivata Hampson, 1902
- Eutelia snelleni Saalmüller, 1881
- Eutelia solitaria (Holland, 1894)
- Eutelia speciosa de Joannis, 1913
- Eutelia strigula Holland, 1894
- Eutelia subrubens (Mabille, 1890)
- Eutelia subviolescens (Viette, 1958)
- Eutelia vadoni Viette, 1958
- Eutelia verini Viette, 1984
- Eutelia violescens (Hampson, 1912)
- Eutelia viridacea Berio, 1966
- Eutelia vulgaris Mabille, 1900
