= Agathodes dufayi =

Scientific classification
- Kingdom: Animalia
- Phylum: Arthropoda
- Clade: Pancrustacea
- Class: Insecta
- Order: Lepidoptera
- Family: Crambidae
- Subfamily: Spilomelinae
- Tribe: Margaroniini
- Genus: Agathodes
- Species: A. dufayi

Binomial name
- Agathodes dufayi Rougeot, 1977

Species of moth

Agathodes dufayi is a moth in the family Crambidae. It was described by Rougeot in 1977. It is found in Ethiopia.
