= Mesocolpia marmorata =

Scientific classification
- Kingdom: Animalia
- Phylum: Arthropoda
- Class: Insecta
- Order: Lepidoptera
- Family: Geometridae
- Genus: Mesocolpia
- Species: M. marmorata

Binomial name
- Mesocolpia marmorata (Warren, 1899)

Synonyms
- Chloroclystis marmorata Warren, 1899

Species of moth

Mesocolpia marmorata is a moth in the family Geometridae. It is found in Nigeria and Sierra Leone.
