= Pardomima phalarota =

Scientific classification
- Kingdom: Animalia
- Phylum: Arthropoda
- Class: Insecta
- Order: Lepidoptera
- Family: Crambidae
- Genus: Pardomima
- Species: P. phalarota

Binomial name
- Pardomima phalarota (Meyrick, 1933)

Synonyms
- Lygropia phalarota Meyrick, 1933

Species of moth

Pardomima phalarota is a moth in the family Crambidae. It was described by Edward Meyrick in 1933. It is found in Angola, the Democratic Republic of the Congo (Equateur, North Kivu, Katanga), Kenya, Malawi, South Africa (KwaZulu-Natal), Zambia and Zimbabwe.
