= Lobesia hecista =

Scientific classification
- Kingdom: Animalia
- Phylum: Arthropoda
- Class: Insecta
- Order: Lepidoptera
- Family: Tortricidae
- Genus: Lobesia
- Species: L. hecista

Binomial name
- Lobesia hecista Razowski, 2013

Species of moth

Lobesia hecista is a species of moth of the family Tortricidae. It is found in Nigeria.

The wingspan is about 10.5 mm.

The species lives on the African continent. Some live in Nigeria.

== Etymology ==
The species name refers to the size of the species and is derived from Greek hekistos (meaning the smallest).
