= Lobesia drasteria =

Scientific classification
- Kingdom: Animalia
- Phylum: Arthropoda
- Class: Insecta
- Order: Lepidoptera
- Family: Tortricidae
- Genus: Lobesia
- Species: L. drasteria

Binomial name
- Lobesia drasteria Razowski, 2013

Species of moth

Lobesia drasteria is a species of moth of the family Tortricidae first described by Józef Razowski in 2013. It is found on Seram Island in Indonesia. The habitat consists of lower montane forests.

The wingspan is about 16 mm.

== Etymology ==
The specific name refers to the colouration of the forewings and is derived from Greek drasterios (meaning drastic, enterprising).
