= Podomachla antinorii =

Scientific classification
- Domain: Eukaryota
- Kingdom: Animalia
- Phylum: Arthropoda
- Class: Insecta
- Order: Lepidoptera
- Superfamily: Noctuoidea
- Family: Erebidae
- Subfamily: Arctiinae
- Genus: Podomachla
- Species: P. antinorii

Binomial name
- Podomachla antinorii (Oberthür, 1880)

Synonyms
- Nyctemera antinorii Oberthür, 1880

Species of moth

Podomachla antinorii is a moth of the family Erebidae. It is found in Cameroon, Ethiopia, Sierra Leone and Tanzania.
