= Lobesia extrusana =

Scientific classification
- Kingdom: Animalia
- Phylum: Arthropoda
- Clade: Pancrustacea
- Class: Insecta
- Order: Lepidoptera
- Family: Tortricidae
- Genus: Lobesia
- Species: L. extrusana

Binomial name
- Lobesia extrusana (Walker, 1863)

Synonyms
- Grapholita extrusana Walker, 1863; Capua discotypa Turner, 1916; Analdes hypolepta Turner, 1916

Species of moth

Lobesia extrusana is a species of moth of the family Tortricidae. It is found in Australia, where it has been recorded from Queensland and New South Wales.

The wingspan is 11–12 mm. The forewings are brown whitish, with fuscous transverse lines and some dark-fuscous irroration (sprinkling). The hindwings are fuscous, thinly scaled towards the base.
