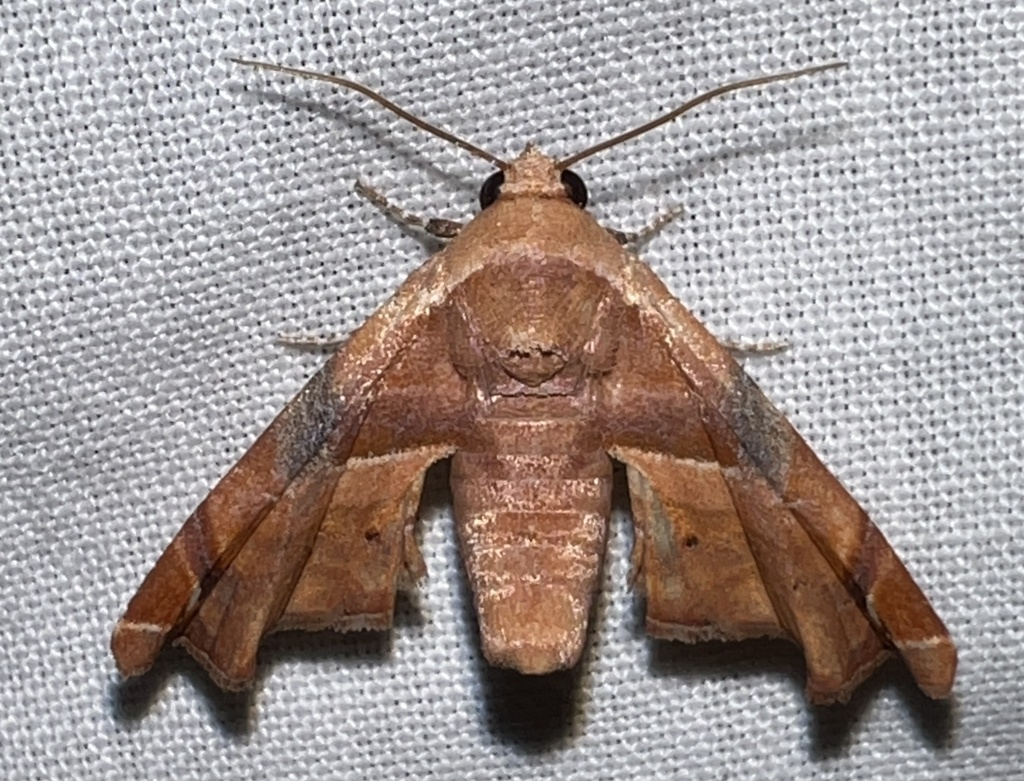

Scientific classification
- Kingdom: Animalia
- Phylum: Arthropoda
- Clade: Pancrustacea
- Class: Insecta
- Order: Lepidoptera
- Superfamily: Noctuoidea
- Family: Euteliidae
- Genus: Eutelia
- Species: E. gilvicolor

Binomial name
- Eutelia gilvicolor Mabille, 1900

= Eutelia gilvicolor =

Species of moth

Eutelia gilvicolor is a species of moth in the family Euteliidae. It was described by Paul Mabille in 1900.. This species has been documented in South Africa.
