= Paschiodes mesoleucalis =

Scientific classification
- Kingdom: Animalia
- Phylum: Arthropoda
- Class: Insecta
- Order: Lepidoptera
- Family: Crambidae
- Genus: Paschiodes
- Species: P. mesoleucalis

Binomial name
- Paschiodes mesoleucalis (Hampson, 1913)

Synonyms
- Paschiodes bekaledjae Rougeot, 1977; Oeobia trichroa Meyrick, 1934

Species of moth

Paschiodes mesoleucalis is a moth in the family Crambidae. It was described by George Hampson in 1913. It is found in the Democratic Republic of the Congo, Ethiopia, Kenya, Rwanda, South Africa (Eastern Cape, Gauteng), Uganda and Zimbabwe.
