= Pardomima zanclophora =

Scientific classification
- Kingdom: Animalia
- Phylum: Arthropoda
- Class: Insecta
- Order: Lepidoptera
- Family: Crambidae
- Genus: Pardomima
- Species: P. zanclophora

Binomial name
- Pardomima zanclophora E. L. Martin, 1955

Species of moth

Pardomima zanclophora is a moth in the family Crambidae. It was described by Edward L. Martin in 1955. It is found on the Comoros (Mohéli, Mayotte, Grande Comore) and the Seychelles (Assumption, Aldabra), as well as in the Democratic Republic of the Congo (North Kivu, Equateur, Katanga), Ethiopia, Kenya, Madagascar, Mozambique, South Africa, Tanzania and Saudi Arabia.
