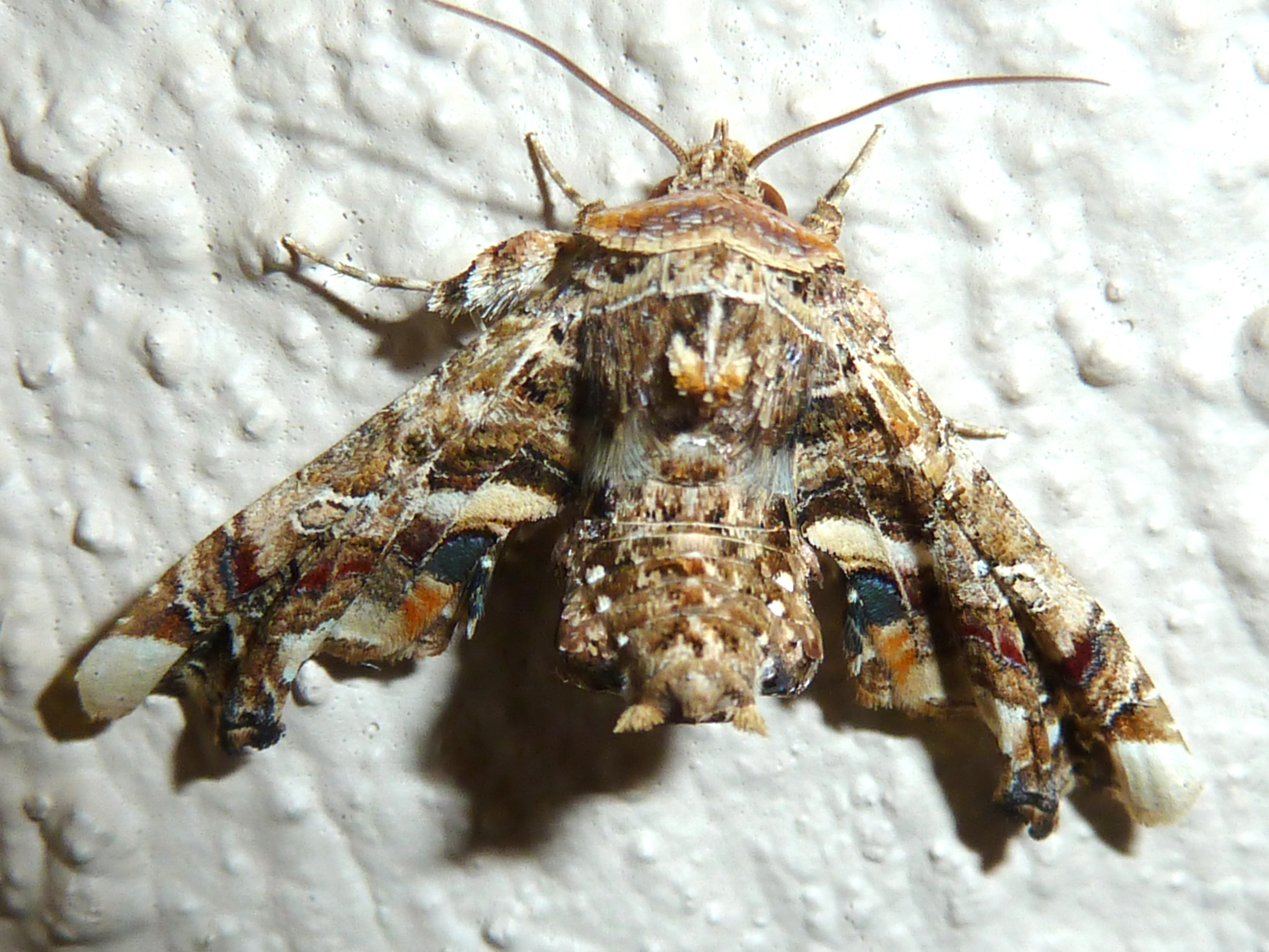

Scientific classification
- Kingdom: Animalia
- Phylum: Arthropoda
- Clade: Pancrustacea
- Class: Insecta
- Order: Lepidoptera
- Superfamily: Noctuoidea
- Family: Euteliidae
- Genus: Eutelia
- Species: E. adulatrix

Binomial name
- Eutelia adulatrix Hübner, 1813

Synonyms
- Noctua adulatrix Hübner, 1813

= Eutelia adulatrix =

Species of moth

Eutelia adulatrix is a species of moth in the family Euteliidae.

== Description ==
Eutelia adulatrix was described by Jacob Hübner in 1813.

== Range ==
It is found in much of Southern and Eastern Africa, including Botswana, Ethiopia, Kenya, Lesotho, South Africa, and Zimbabwe.

== Ecology ==
Documented host plants of Eutelia adulatrix are primarily in the family Anacardiaceae.
