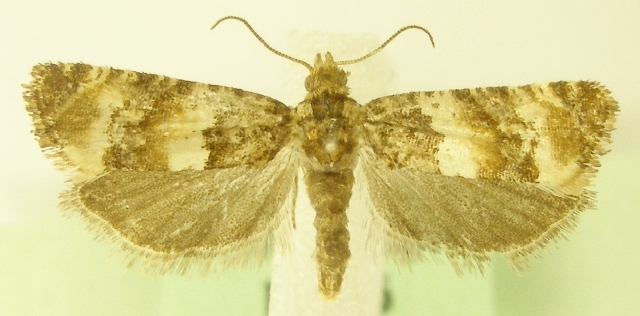

Scientific classification
- Kingdom: Animalia
- Phylum: Arthropoda
- Clade: Pancrustacea
- Class: Insecta
- Order: Lepidoptera
- Family: Tortricidae
- Genus: Lobesia
- Species: L. artemisiana

Binomial name
- Lobesia artemisiana (Zeller, 1847)

= Lobesia artemisiana =

Species of moth

Lobesia artemisiana is a species of moth belonging to the family Tortricidae.

It is native to Europe.
