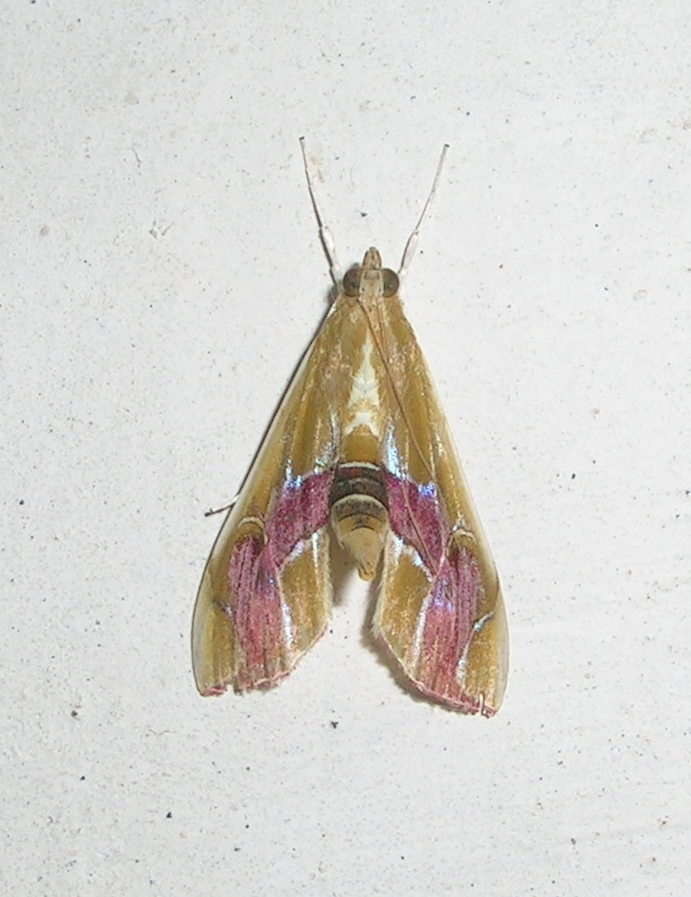
- Agathodes ostentalis

Scientific classification
- Kingdom: Animalia
- Phylum: Arthropoda
- Clade: Pancrustacea
- Class: Insecta
- Order: Lepidoptera
- Family: Crambidae
- Subfamily: Spilomelinae
- Tribe: Margaroniini
- Genus: Agathodes; Armando Castel Branco,1973

Synonyms
- Stenurges Lederer, 1863

= Agathodes =

Genus of moths

Agathodes is a genus of moths of the family Crambidae. The genus was first described by Achille Guenée in 1854.

== Species ==
- Agathodes bibundalis Strand, 1913
- Agathodes caliginosalis Snellen, 1895
- Agathodes designalis Guenée, 1854
- Agathodes dufayi Rougeot, 1977
- Agathodes incoloralis (Hampson, 1918)
- Agathodes isabella Viette, 1989
- Agathodes minimalis Hampson, 1912
- Agathodes modicalis Guenée, 1854
- Agathodes musivalis Guenée, 1854
- Agathodes ostentalis (Geyer in Hübner, 1837)
- Agathodes paliscia Turner, 1908
- Agathodes rebeli Tams, 1935
- Agathodes thomensis Castel-Branco, 1973
- Agathodes transiens Munroe, 1960
