= Eulophonotus elegans =

Scientific classification
- Kingdom: Animalia
- Phylum: Arthropoda
- Class: Insecta
- Order: Lepidoptera
- Family: Cossidae
- Genus: Eulophonotus
- Species: E. elegans

Binomial name
- Eulophonotus elegans (Aurivillius, 1910)

Synonyms
- Callocossus elegans Aurivillius, 1910

Species of moth

Eulophonotus elegans is a moth in the family Cossidae. The moth is found in Sierra Leone, Cameroon, the Republic of Congo, Equatorial Guinea and Tanzania.
