= Paschiodes aethiopicalis =

Scientific classification
- Kingdom: Animalia
- Phylum: Arthropoda
- Class: Insecta
- Order: Lepidoptera
- Family: Crambidae
- Genus: Paschiodes
- Species: P. aethiopicalis

Binomial name
- Paschiodes aethiopicalis (Hampson, 1913)

Synonyms
- Parbattia aethiopicalis Hampson, 1913

Species of moth

Paschiodes aethiopicalis is a moth in the family Crambidae. It was described by George Hampson in 1913. It is found in Kenya.
