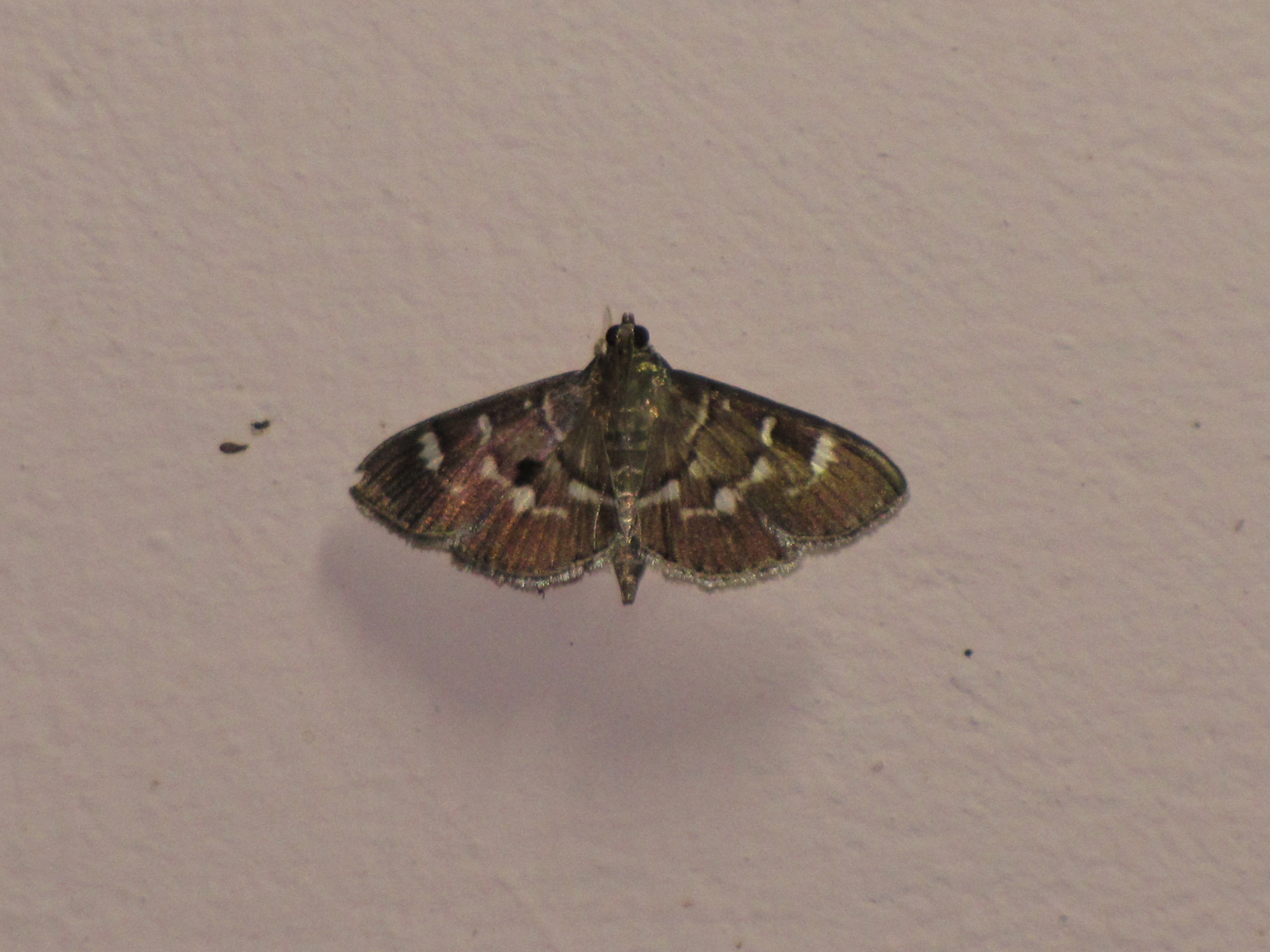

Scientific classification
- Kingdom: Animalia
- Phylum: Arthropoda
- Class: Insecta
- Order: Lepidoptera
- Family: Crambidae
- Genus: Pardomima
- Species: P. distortana

Binomial name
- Pardomima distortana (Strand, 1913)

Synonyms
- Lygropia distortana Strand, 1913; Sylepta tumidipes ab. hampsoniana Strand, 1916; Pardomima distorta

= Pardomima distortana =

Species of moth

Pardomima distortana is a moth of the family Crambidae. It is found in Cameroon, the Democratic Republic of Congo (Equateur), Equatorial Guinea, Gabon, Ghana, Ivory Coast, Nigeria and Sierra Leone.
