= Pardomima furcirenalis =

Scientific classification
- Kingdom: Animalia
- Phylum: Arthropoda
- Class: Insecta
- Order: Lepidoptera
- Family: Crambidae
- Genus: Pardomima
- Species: P. furcirenalis

Binomial name
- Pardomima furcirenalis (Hampson, 1918)

Synonyms
- Lamprosema furcirenalis Hampson, 1918; Lamprosema fuscirenalis

Species of moth

Pardomima furcirenalis is a moth in the family Crambidae. It was described by George Hampson in 1918. It is found in the South African provinces of KwaZulu-Natal, Western Cape and Eastern Cape.
