= Paschiodes ugandae =

Scientific classification
- Domain: Eukaryota
- Kingdom: Animalia
- Phylum: Arthropoda
- Class: Insecta
- Order: Lepidoptera
- Family: Crambidae
- Genus: Paschiodes
- Species: P. ugandae

Binomial name
- Paschiodes ugandae Maes, 2005

Species of moth

Paschiodes ugandae is a moth in the family Crambidae. It was described by Koen V. N. Maes in 2005. It is found in Uganda.
