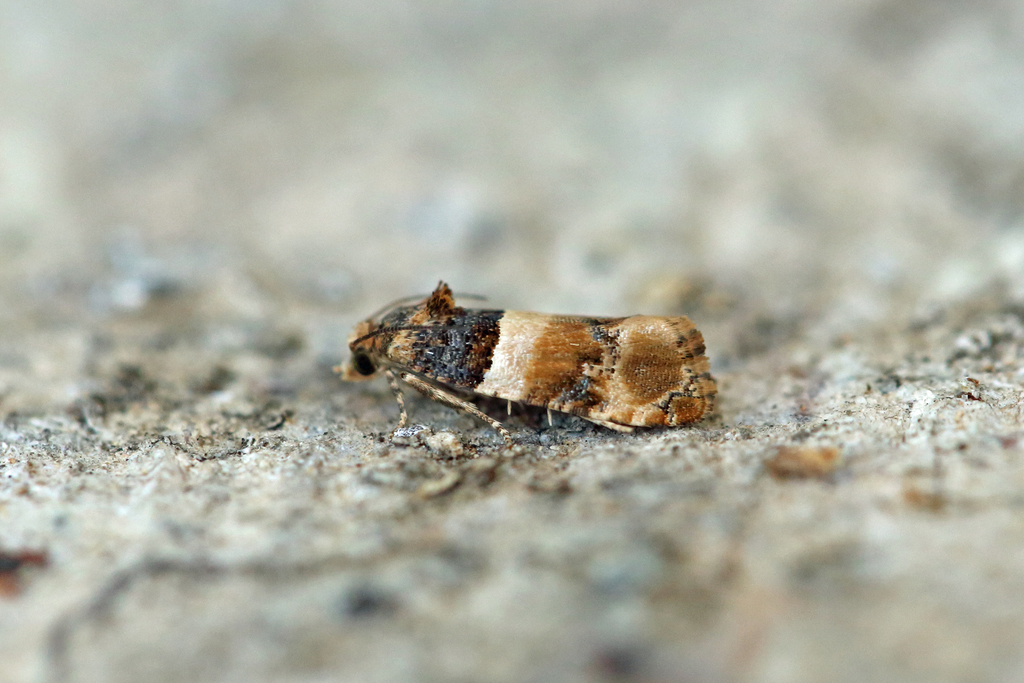

Scientific classification
- Domain: Eukaryota
- Kingdom: Animalia
- Phylum: Arthropoda
- Class: Insecta
- Order: Lepidoptera
- Family: Tortricidae
- Genus: Lobesia
- Species: L. bicinctana

Binomial name
- Lobesia bicinctana (Duponchel, 1844)

= Lobesia bicinctana =

Species of moth

Lobesia bicinctana is a moth belonging to the family Tortricidae. The species was first described by Philogène Auguste Joseph Duponchel in 1844.

It is native to Europe and Northern America.
