= Mesocolpia nanula =

Scientific classification
- Domain: Eukaryota
- Kingdom: Animalia
- Phylum: Arthropoda
- Class: Insecta
- Order: Lepidoptera
- Family: Geometridae
- Genus: Mesocolpia
- Species: M. nanula

Binomial name
- Mesocolpia nanula (Mabille, 1900)

Synonyms
- Cidaria nanula Mabille, 1900; Chloroclystis nanula; Chloroclystis toreumata Prout, 1937

Species of moth

Mesocolpia nanula is a moth in the family Geometridae. It is found in Angola, Cape Verde, Comoros Madagascar, Eswatini, Gambia, Kenya, Mauritius, Réunion, Oman, Saudi Arabia, South Africa, Tanzania and Zimbabwe.
