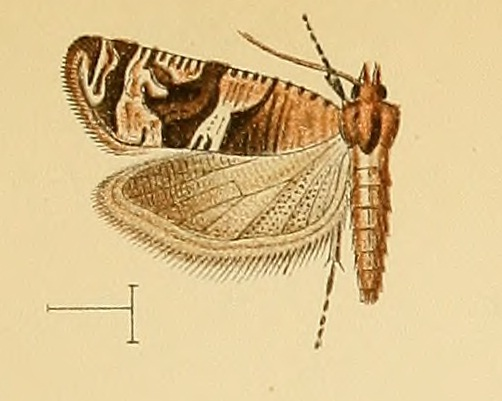

Scientific classification
- Domain: Eukaryota
- Kingdom: Animalia
- Phylum: Arthropoda
- Class: Insecta
- Order: Lepidoptera
- Family: Tortricidae
- Genus: Lobesia
- Species: L. neptunia

Binomial name
- Lobesia neptunia (Walsingham, 1907)

Synonyms
- Polychrosis neptunia Walsingham, 1907

= Lobesia neptunia =

Species of moth

Lobesia neptunia is a moth of the family Tortricidae. It is found on the Canary Islands and Madeira.

The wingspan is 9–12 mm. The forewings vary from ochreous to brownish ochreous or reddish fuscous. The hindwings are pale brownish grey.

The larvae feed on Frankenia ericifolia and Limonium pectinatum. They mine the leaves of their host plant.
