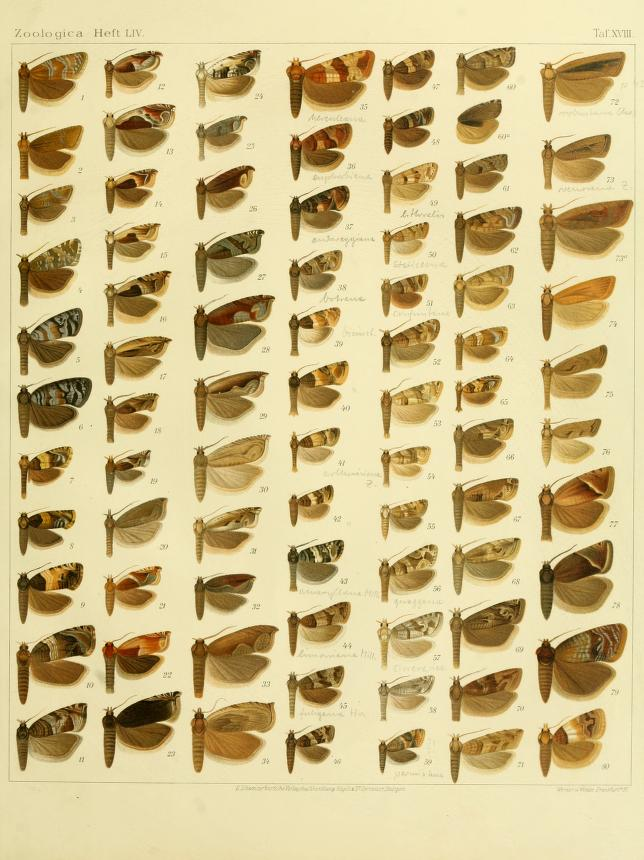
- Lobesia fuligana figures 45-48

Scientific classification
- Kingdom: Animalia
- Phylum: Arthropoda
- Clade: Pancrustacea
- Class: Insecta
- Order: Lepidoptera
- Family: Tortricidae
- Genus: Lobesia
- Species: L. fuligana

Binomial name
- Lobesia fuligana (Haworth, 1811)

Synonyms
- Lobesia abscisana (Doubleday, 1849)

= Lobesia fuligana =

Species of moth

Lobesia fuligana is a moth belonging to the family Tortricidae. The species was first described by Adrian Hardy Haworth in 1811. It is found in Europe.

The wingspan is 10–13 mm. The forewings are ochreous-whitish, strigulated with dark fuscous.The basal patch, the central fascia, and a terminal fascia which is narrowed to the tornus are dark brown. The hindwings are grey. The larva is blue-green; head and plate of 2 yellowish-brown:

This species is bivoltine flying in two generations in May and again in July–August. They are active at dusk.

The larva lives in spun shoots on: Echium vulgare, Anchusa officinalis, Artemesia and Cirsium arvense. Pupation takes places in a cocoon, spun amongst surface litter.
