= Eulophonotus armstrongi =

Scientific classification
- Kingdom: Animalia
- Phylum: Arthropoda
- Class: Insecta
- Order: Lepidoptera
- Family: Cossidae
- Genus: Eulophonotus
- Species: E. armstrongi

Binomial name
- Eulophonotus armstrongi (Hampson, 1915)

Synonyms
- Duomitus armstrongi Hampson, 1915

Species of moth

Eulophonotus armstrongi is a moth in the family Cossidae. It is found in Ghana and Sierra Leone. The larvae feed on Coffea arabica.
