= Polyphagozerra =

Scientific classification
- Kingdom: Animalia
- Phylum: Arthropoda
- Clade: Pancrustacea
- Class: Insecta
- Order: Lepidoptera
- Family: Cossidae
- Subfamily: Zeuzerinae
- Genus: Polyphagozerra; Yakovlev, 2011

Genus of moths

Polyphagozerra is a genus of moths in the family Cossidae.

== Species ==
- Polyphagozerra coffeae (Nietner, 1861)
- Polyphagozerra reticulata (Joicey et Talbot, 1916)
