= Pardomima telanepsia =

Scientific classification
- Kingdom: Animalia
- Phylum: Arthropoda
- Clade: Pancrustacea
- Class: Insecta
- Order: Lepidoptera
- Family: Crambidae
- Genus: Pardomima
- Species: P. telanepsia

Binomial name
- Pardomima telanepsia E. L. Martin, 1955

Species of moth

Pardomima telanepsia is a moth in the family Crambidae. It was described by Edward L. Martin in 1955. It is found in Cameroon, Chad, Equatorial Guinea, Ghana, Ivory Coast and Nigeria.
