= Lobesia kurokoi =

Scientific classification
- Domain: Eukaryota
- Kingdom: Animalia
- Phylum: Arthropoda
- Class: Insecta
- Order: Lepidoptera
- Family: Tortricidae
- Genus: Lobesia
- Species: L. kurokoi

Binomial name
- Lobesia kurokoi Bae, 1995

Species of moth

Lobesia kurokoi is a moth of the family Tortricidae. It is found in Thailand.
