= Podomachla =

Scientific classification
- Domain: Eukaryota
- Kingdom: Animalia
- Phylum: Arthropoda
- Class: Insecta
- Order: Lepidoptera
- Superfamily: Noctuoidea
- Family: Erebidae
- Subfamily: Arctiinae
- Subtribe: Nyctemerina
- Genus: Podomachla; Strand, 1909

Genus of moths

Podomachla is a genus of tiger moths in the family Erebidae.

== Species ==
- Podomachla acraeina
- Podomachla antinorii
- Podomachla apicalis
- Podomachla arieticornis
- Podomachla chromis
- Podomachla insularis
- Podomachla usambarae
- Podomachla virgo
