= Pardomima viettealis =

Scientific classification
- Kingdom: Animalia
- Phylum: Arthropoda
- Class: Insecta
- Order: Lepidoptera
- Family: Crambidae
- Genus: Pardomima
- Species: P. viettealis

Binomial name
- Pardomima viettealis Martin, 1956

Synonyms
- Thliptoceras elegans Guillermet, 1996

Species of moth

Pardomima viettealis is a moth of the family Crambidae. It occurs in La Réunion and Mauritius.
