= Agathodes minimalis =

Scientific classification
- Kingdom: Animalia
- Phylum: Arthropoda
- Clade: Pancrustacea
- Class: Insecta
- Order: Lepidoptera
- Family: Crambidae
- Genus: Agathodes
- Species: A. minimalis

Binomial name
- Agathodes minimalis Hampson, 1912

Species of moth

Agathodes minimalis is a moth in the family Crambidae. It was described by George Hampson in 1912. It is found in Nigeria.
