= Pardomima azancla =

Scientific classification
- Kingdom: Animalia
- Phylum: Arthropoda
- Class: Insecta
- Order: Lepidoptera
- Family: Crambidae
- Genus: Pardomima
- Species: P. azancla

Binomial name
- Pardomima azancla E. L. Martin, 1955

Species of moth

Pardomima azancla is a moth in the family Crambidae. It was described by Edward L. Martin in 1955. It is found on Madagascar.
