= Agathodes thomensis =

Scientific classification
- Kingdom: Animalia
- Phylum: Arthropoda
- Clade: Pancrustacea
- Class: Insecta
- Order: Lepidoptera
- Family: Crambidae
- Genus: Agathodes
- Species: A. thomensis

Binomial name
- Agathodes thomensis Castel-Branco, 1973

Species of moth

Agathodes thomensis is a moth in the family Crambidae. It was described by Armando Jacques Favre Castel-Branco in 1973. It is found on São Tomé Island off the west coast of Africa.
