= Podomachla insularis =

Scientific classification
- Domain: Eukaryota
- Kingdom: Animalia
- Phylum: Arthropoda
- Class: Insecta
- Order: Lepidoptera
- Superfamily: Noctuoidea
- Family: Erebidae
- Subfamily: Arctiinae
- Genus: Podomachla
- Species: P. insularis

Binomial name
- Podomachla insularis (Talbot, 1929)

Synonyms
- Deilemera insularis Talbot, 1929; Nyctemera insulana Bryk, 1937

Species of moth

Podomachla insularis is a moth of the family Erebidae first described by George Talbot in 1929. It is found on São Tomé Island.
