= Mesocolpia subcomosa =

Scientific classification
- Domain: Eukaryota
- Kingdom: Animalia
- Phylum: Arthropoda
- Class: Insecta
- Order: Lepidoptera
- Family: Geometridae
- Genus: Mesocolpia
- Species: M. subcomosa

Binomial name
- Mesocolpia subcomosa Warren, 1901

Synonyms
- Chloroclystis subcomosa

Species of moth

Mesocolpia subcomosa is a moth in the family Geometridae. It is found on São Tomé.

Its forewings are pale greenish wish darker green waved cross-lines. It has a wingspan of 18 millimetres (0.71 in) for the males and 16 millimetres (0.63 in) for the females.
