= Pardomima martinalis =

Scientific classification
- Kingdom: Animalia
- Phylum: Arthropoda
- Class: Insecta
- Order: Lepidoptera
- Family: Crambidae
- Genus: Pardomima
- Species: P. martinalis

Binomial name
- Pardomima martinalis Viette, 1957

Species of moth

Pardomima martinalis is a moth in the family Crambidae. It was described by Viette in 1957. It is found on São Tomé.
