= Eulophonotus nigrodiscalis =

Scientific classification
- Kingdom: Animalia
- Phylum: Arthropoda
- Clade: Pancrustacea
- Class: Insecta
- Order: Lepidoptera
- Family: Cossidae
- Genus: Eulophonotus
- Species: E. nigrodiscalis

Binomial name
- Eulophonotus nigrodiscalis Yakovlev, 2011

Species of moth

Eulophonotus nigrodiscalis is a moth in the family Cossidae. It is found on São Tomé & Principe.
