= Paschiodes scoparialis =

Scientific classification
- Kingdom: Animalia
- Phylum: Arthropoda
- Class: Insecta
- Order: Lepidoptera
- Family: Crambidae
- Genus: Paschiodes
- Species: P. scoparialis

Binomial name
- Paschiodes scoparialis (Viette, 1957)

Synonyms
- Mecyna scoparialis Viette, 1957

Species of moth

Paschiodes scoparialis is a moth in the family Crambidae. It was described by Viette in 1957. It is found on São Tomé.
