= Asura thomensis =

Scientific classification
- Domain: Eukaryota
- Kingdom: Animalia
- Phylum: Arthropoda
- Class: Insecta
- Order: Lepidoptera
- Superfamily: Noctuoidea
- Family: Erebidae
- Subfamily: Arctiinae
- Genus: Asura
- Species: A. thomensis

Binomial name
- Asura thomensis Rothschild, 1913

Species of moth

Asura thomensis is a moth species of the family Erebidae. It is found on São Tomé Island.
