= Lobesia fetialis =

Scientific classification
- Kingdom: Animalia
- Phylum: Arthropoda
- Class: Insecta
- Order: Lepidoptera
- Family: Tortricidae
- Genus: Lobesia
- Species: L. fetialis

Binomial name
- Lobesia fetialis (Meyrick, 1920)

Synonyms
- Polychrosis fetialis Meyrick, 1920; Lobesia aeolopa Fletcher (nec Meyrick, 1907), 1932; Lobesia fetialis T. B. Fletcher, 1932; Lobesia (Lomaschiza) fetialis Diakonoff, 1954

Species of moth

Lobesia fetialis is a moth of the family Tortricidae first described by Edward Meyrick in 1920. It is found in India, Sri Lanka, Java and Sumatra.

== Description ==
The wingspan of the adult male is 11–15 mm and the female is 9.5-11.5 mm.

Larval food plants are Lantana camara, Bridelia, Evodia accedens, Tarenna asiatica, Clerodendron serratum, Barringtonia spicata, Allophylus cobbe and Jasminum species.
