= Scopula quintaria =

Scientific classification
- Domain: Eukaryota
- Kingdom: Animalia
- Phylum: Arthropoda
- Class: Insecta
- Order: Lepidoptera
- Family: Geometridae
- Genus: Scopula
- Species: S. quintaria

Binomial name
- Scopula quintaria (L. B. Prout, 1916)

Synonyms
- Acidalia quintaria Prout, 1916

Species of geometer moth in subfamily Sterrhinae

Scopula quintaria is a moth of the family Geometridae, first described by Louis Beethoven Prout in 1916. It occurs in Malawi, South Africa and Príncipe.

== Subspecies ==
- Scopula quintaria quintaria (South Africa)
- Scopula quintaria principis Prout, 1932 (Príncipe)
