= Ethmia spyrathodes =

Scientific classification
- Kingdom: Animalia
- Phylum: Arthropoda
- Class: Insecta
- Order: Lepidoptera
- Family: Depressariidae
- Genus: Ethmia
- Species: E. spyrathodes

Binomial name
- Ethmia spyrathodes Meyrick, 1922

Species of moth

Ethmia spyrathodes is a moth in the family Depressariidae first described by Edward Meyrick in 1922. It is found in São Tomé and Príncipe, off the western coast of Central Africa.

The wingspan is about 35 mm (1.4 in). The forewings are ochreous white with black markings: three spots on the basal portion of the costa, the middle one transverse and reaching halfway across the wing, a narrow irregular fascia at one-fourth with the posterior edge acute prominent in the disc and a small round spot beneath the fold before the middle. There is an irregular oblique blotch from the costa before the middle connected in the disc with a moderate irregular fascia from four-fifths of the costa to near the dorsum at three-fourths, dilated on the costa and touching a round spot towards the termen above the middle. There is also a dot beneath the costa beyond the middle and a round spot above the tornus, as well as a marginal series of marks or dots around the apex and termen. The hindwings are light grey, thinly scaled anteriorly, darker towards the termen.
