= Kennelia albifascies =

Scientific classification
- Domain: Eukaryota
- Kingdom: Animalia
- Phylum: Arthropoda
- Class: Insecta
- Order: Lepidoptera
- Family: Tortricidae
- Genus: Kennelia
- Species: K. albifascies

Binomial name
- Kennelia albifascies (Walsingham, 1900)

Synonyms
- Lipsotelus albifacies Walsingham, in Swinhoe, 1900; Argyroploce corthyntis Meyrick, 1909; Olethreutes corthyntis Clarke, 1958

Species of moth

Kennelia albifascies is a moth of the family Tortricidae first described by Lord Walsingham in 1900. It is found in China, India and Sri Lanka.
