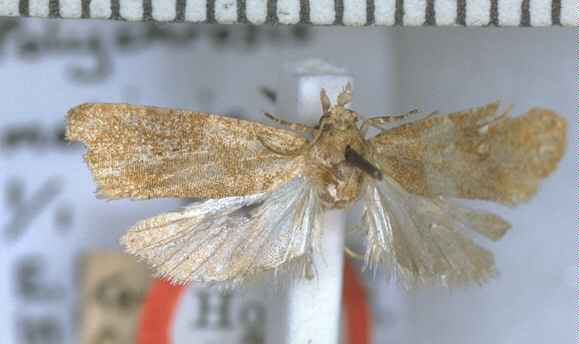
- Female holotype

Scientific classification
- Kingdom: Animalia
- Phylum: Arthropoda
- Class: Insecta
- Order: Lepidoptera
- Family: Tortricidae
- Genus: Polychrosis
- Species: P. meliscia

Binomial name
- Polychrosis meliscia Meyrick, 1910

Synonyms
- Lobesia meliscia (Meyrick, 1910)

= Polychrosis meliscia =

Species of moth endemic to New Zealand

Polychrosis meliscia is a species of moth of the family Tortricidae. It is found in New Zealand at the Kermadec Islands.

== Taxonomy ==
This species was first described by Edward Meyrick in 1910 using specimens collected on Raoul Island and named Polychrosis meliscia. In 1972 J. S. Dugdale referred to this species as Lobesia meliscia. But in 1988 Dugdale discussed this species under its original name Polychrosis meliscia. This placement was confirmed in 2010 by Robert Hoare in the New Zealand Inventory of Biodiversity where the species was again discussed under the name Polychrosis meliscia. The female holotype specimen is held at the Natural History Museum, London.

== Description ==
Meyrick described this species as follows:

♀. 18mm. Head, palpi, and thorax whitish-ochreous, second joint of palpi finely sprinkled with dark fuscous towards middle. Forewings elongate, posteriorly dilated, costa gently arched, apex obtuse, termen gently rounded, oblique; 2 from ¾ of cell; whitish-ochreous finely speckled with dark fuscous, and irregularly strewn with small ferruginous-ochreous strigulæ; markings faint, indefinite, formed by greater development of dark speckling and strigulation; a moderate basal patch, outer edge nearly straight, rather oblique; central fascia indicated by a broad costal blotch reaching half across wing and a patch before tornus; cilia whitish-ochreous, obscurely barred with ferruginous-ochreous. Hindwings grey-whitish, posteriorly faintly strigulated with grey; cilia whitish.

== Distribution ==
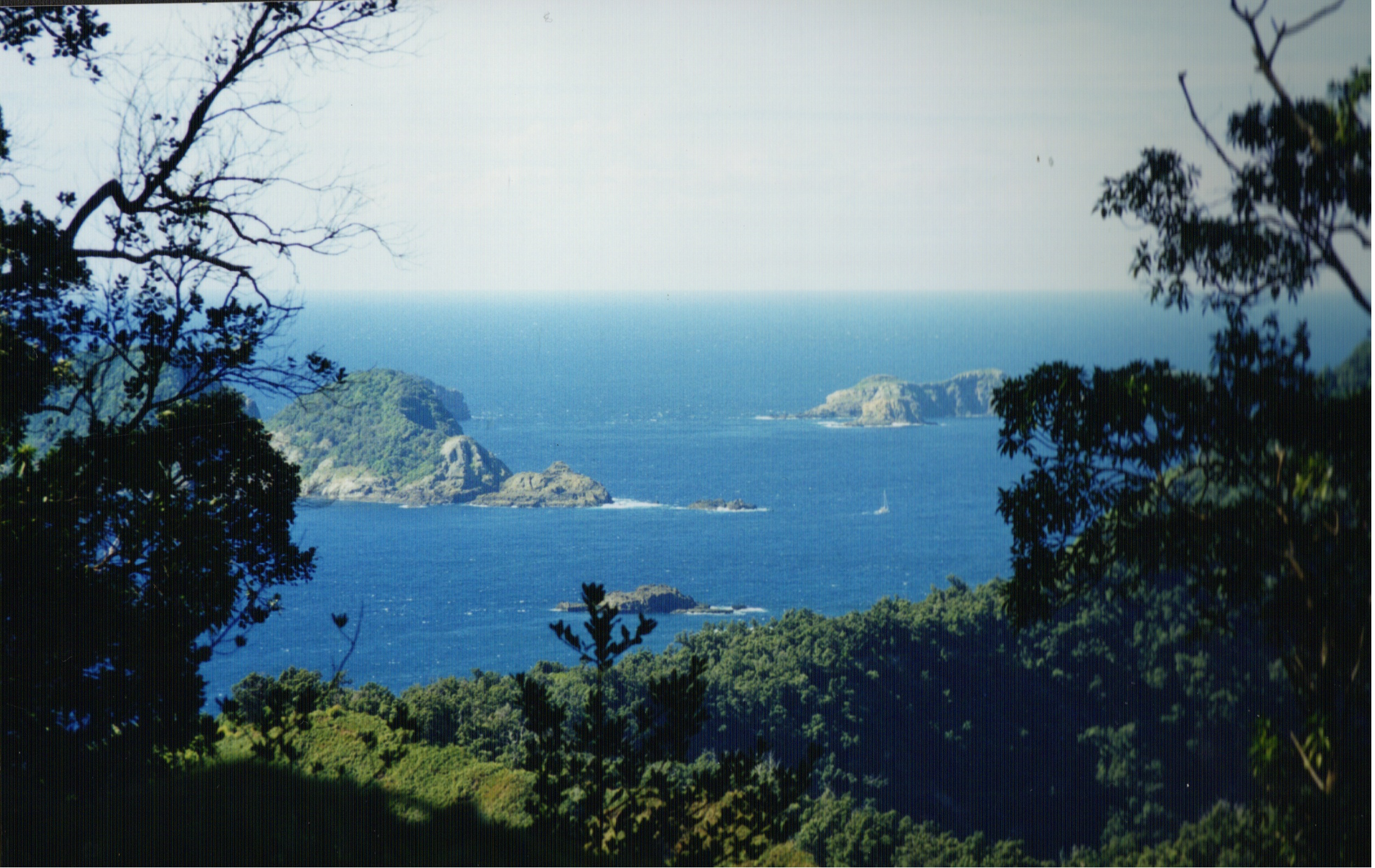
View from Raoul Island, the type locality of P. meliscia.

This species is found on the Kermadec Islands.
