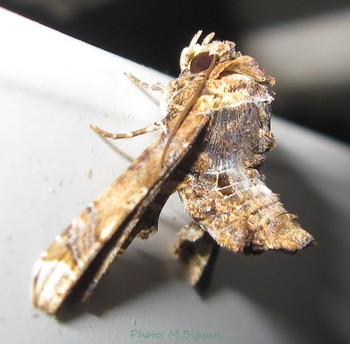

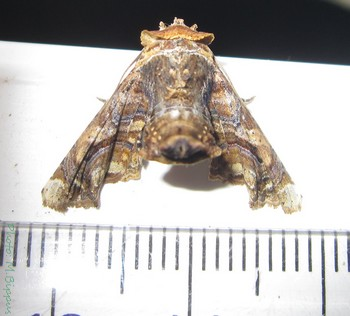

Scientific classification
- Kingdom: Animalia
- Phylum: Arthropoda
- Class: Insecta
- Order: Lepidoptera
- Superfamily: Noctuoidea
- Family: Euteliidae
- Genus: Eutelia
- Species: E. blandiatrix

Binomial name
- Eutelia blandiatrix (Guenée, 1852)

Synonyms
- Eurhipidia blandiatrix Guenée, 1852

= Eutelia blandiatrix =

Species of moth

Eutelia blandiatrix is a moth of the family Euteliidae first described by Achille Guenée in 1852. It is found in southern Asia.

It has a wingspan of about 25–30 mm.

Formerly this species had been reported to occur also in Africa but recent examinations showed that it is a separate species.
