= Polyphagozerra reticulata =

Scientific classification
- Kingdom: Animalia
- Phylum: Arthropoda
- Class: Insecta
- Order: Lepidoptera
- Family: Cossidae
- Genus: Polyphagozerra
- Species: P. reticulata

Binomial name
- Polyphagozerra reticulata (Joicey & Talbot, 1916)

Synonyms
- Zeuzera reticulata Joicey & Talbot, 1916; Zeuzera buergersi Gaede, 1933

Species of moth

Polyphagozerra reticulata is a moth in the family Cossidae. It was described by James John Joicey and George Talbot in 1916. It is found on New Guinea and the Moluccas.
