= Scopula acinosa =

Scientific classification
- Domain: Eukaryota
- Kingdom: Animalia
- Phylum: Arthropoda
- Class: Insecta
- Order: Lepidoptera
- Family: Geometridae
- Genus: Scopula
- Species: S. acinosa

Binomial name
- Scopula acinosa (Prout, 1932)

Synonyms
- Antitrygodes acinosa Prout, 1932

Species of geometer moths in subfamily Sterrhinae

Scopula acinosa is a moth of the family Geometridae. It is found on the island of São Tomé.
