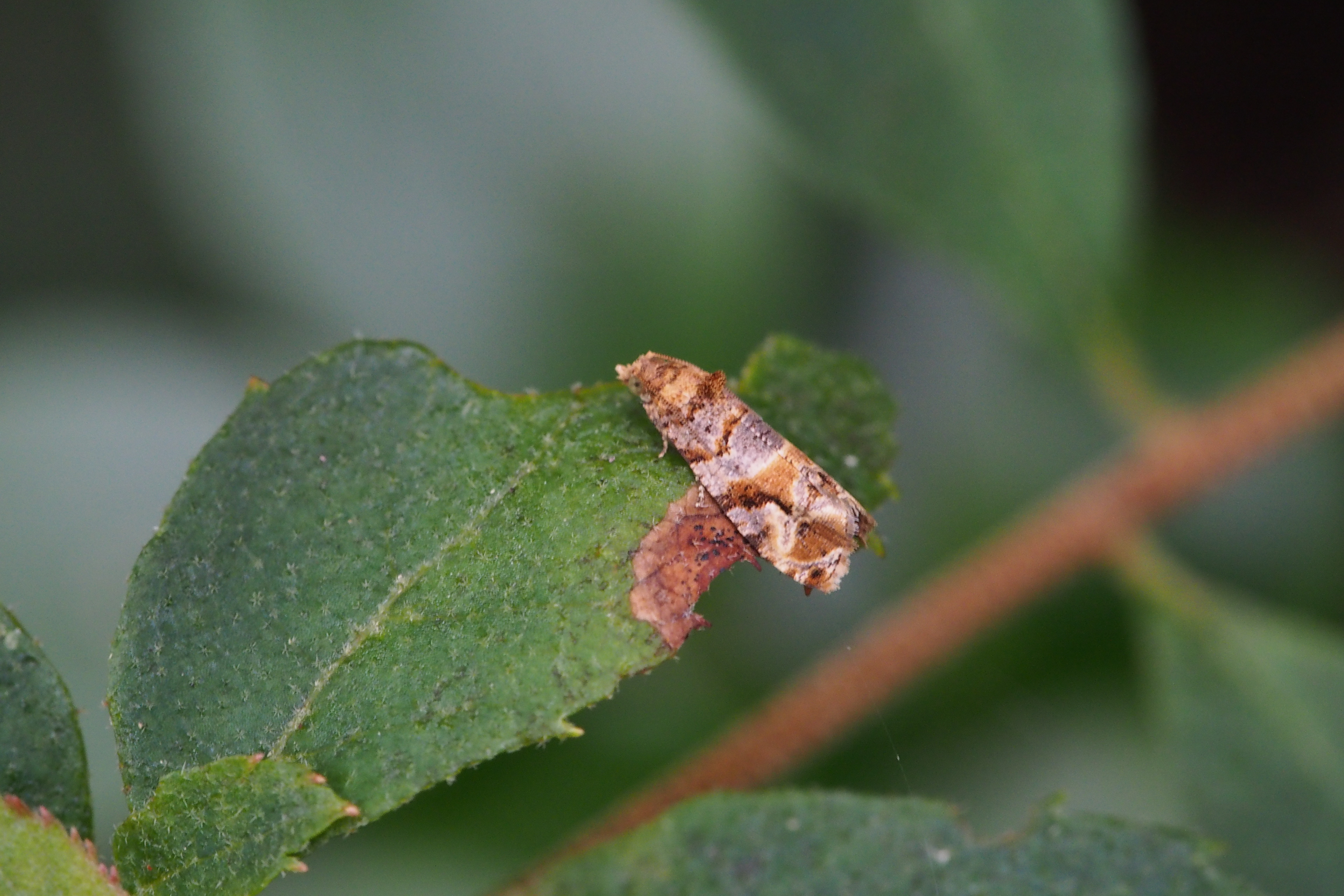

Scientific classification
- Kingdom: Animalia
- Phylum: Arthropoda
- Class: Insecta
- Order: Lepidoptera
- Family: Tortricidae
- Genus: Lobesia
- Species: L. aeolopa

Binomial name
- Lobesia aeolopa Meyrick, 1907

Synonyms
- Lobesia proterandra Meyrick, 1921; Lobesia dryopelta Meyrick, 1932; Lobesia eustales Bradley, 1956

= Lobesia aeolopa =

Species of moth

Lobesia aeolopa is a moth of the family Tortricidae first described by Edward Meyrick in 1907. It is found in Vietnam, Thailand, India, Sri Lanka, Myanmar, Java, the Solomon Islands, Korea, Japan, Taiwan, São Tomé and Príncipe, Tanzania, South Africa, Réunion and Madagascar.

== Biology ==
The wingspan is 10–12 mm.

Larvae have been found on Ricinus communis, Melochia umbellata, Pluchea indica, Lantana camara, Cajanus indicus, Gleditsia triacanthos and Flacourtia indica, but are possibly predatory on aphids, rather than feeding on plant tissue.
