= Podomachla apicalis =

Scientific classification
- Kingdom: Animalia
- Phylum: Arthropoda
- Class: Insecta
- Order: Lepidoptera
- Superfamily: Noctuoidea
- Family: Erebidae
- Subfamily: Arctiinae
- Genus: Podomachla
- Species: P. apicalis

Binomial name
- Podomachla apicalis (Walker, 1854)

Synonyms
- Nyctemera apicalis Walker, 1854; Leptosoma fuscipenne Wallengren, 1860; Leptosoma tricolor Felder, 1874

Species of moth

Podomachla apicalis is a moth of the family Erebidae. It is found in Angola, Cameroon, the Republic of Congo, the Democratic Republic of Congo, Equatorial Guinea, Eritrea, Ethiopia, Gabon, Ghana, Kenya, Liberia, Malawi, Mozambique, Nigeria, Sierra Leone, South Africa, São Tomé & Principe, Tanzania, Togo and Uganda.

The larvae have been recorded feeding on Asteraceae species.
