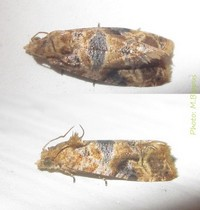

Scientific classification
- Domain: Eukaryota
- Kingdom: Animalia
- Phylum: Arthropoda
- Class: Insecta
- Order: Lepidoptera
- Family: Tortricidae
- Genus: Lobesia
- Species: L. vanillana

Binomial name
- Lobesia vanillana de Joannis, 1900

Synonyms
- Conchylis vanillana de Joannis, 1900; Clysia vanillana; Eupoecilia vanillana; Lobesia triancanthis Diakonoff, 1992

= Lobesia vanillana =

Species of moth

Lobesia vanillana is a moth of the family Tortricidae. It was described in 1900 by Joseph de Joannis from five males and one female from Réunion island. It is found in Réunion, Aldabra atoll, Picard Island, Madagascar, Kenya and Nigeria.

The length is about 6 mm.

Larvae have been found on Vanilla planifolia (de Joannis, 1900 and Diakanoff, 1969) and Mangifera sp. (Diakanoff, 1969)
