= Mesocolpia consobrina =

Scientific classification
- Kingdom: Animalia
- Phylum: Arthropoda
- Class: Insecta
- Order: Lepidoptera
- Family: Geometridae
- Genus: Mesocolpia
- Species: M. consobrina

Binomial name
- Mesocolpia consobrina (Warren, 1901)

Synonyms
- Calluga consobrina Warren, 1901; Chloroclystis consobrina; Chloroclystis sylleptria Prout, 1937

Species of moth

Mesocolpia consobrina is a moth in the family Geometridae first described by William Warren in 1901. It is found on São Tomé Island (the type locality), Angola, DR Congo, Kenya, Nigeria, Sierra Leone and South Africa.

== Subspecies ==
- Mesocolpia consobrina consobrina
- Mesocolpia consobrina sylleptria (Prout, 1937)
