= Eulophonotus myrmeleon =

Scientific classification
- Kingdom: Animalia
- Phylum: Arthropoda
- Class: Insecta
- Order: Lepidoptera
- Family: Cossidae
- Genus: Eulophonotus
- Species: E. myrmeleon

Binomial name
- Eulophonotus myrmeleon Felder, 1874

Species of moth

Eulophonotus myrmeleon is a moth in the family Cossidae. It is found in Cameroon, the Republic of Congo, the Democratic Republic of Congo, Equatorial Guinea, Ethiopia, Ghana, Ivory Coast, Kenya, Mozambique, Namibia, Nigeria, Sierra Leone, South Africa, São Tomé & Principe, Togo, Uganda and Zimbabwe.

The larvae feed on Trichilia, Triplochiton scleroxylon, Cola acuminata, Cola nitida, Acalypha, Theobroma cacao, Populus and Combretum.
