= Syzygium pycnanthum =

- Botanical illustration (fig. 446)
- Botanical illustration (fig. 447)

Conservation status
- Least Concern (IUCN 3.1)

Scientific classification
- Kingdom: Plantae
- Clade: Tracheophytes
- Clade: Angiosperms
- Clade: Eudicots
- Clade: Rosids
- Order: Myrtales
- Family: Myrtaceae
- Genus: Syzygium
- Species: S. pycnanthum

Binomial name
- Syzygium pycnanthum Merr. & L.M.Perry

Synonyms
- Eugenia corymbosa Roxb.; Eugenia densiflora (Blume) Miq.; Jambosa densiflora (Blume) DC.; Myrtus densiflora Blume; Syzygium densiflorum (Blume) Wall. ex Masam.

Species of plant

Syzygium pycnanthum, the wild rose apple, is a species of flowering plant in the family Myrtaceae. It is native to the Nicobar Islands, Peninsular Thailand, and Malesia (except the Philippines). A shrub or tree reaching 2 to 21 m (7 to 69 ft), it is typically found in riparian habitats and open woodlands from sea level up to 1,500 m (5,000 ft). It has been assessed as Least Concern.
