= List of species named simplex =

The species name simplex (Latin for "simple") occurs frequently in binomial names throughout the taxonomy of life. Examples include:

== Plants ==
=== Monocots ===
- Amitostigma simplex, a species of plant in the family Orchidaceae
- Bulbophyllum simplex, a species of orchid in the genus Bulbophyllum
- Coelogyne simplex, a species of orchid
- Puccinellia simplex, a species of grass known by the common names western alkali grass and California alkali grass
- Oenocarpus simplex, a species of flowering plant in the family Arecaceae
- Vriesea simplex, a species of the genus Vriesea

=== Eudicots ===
- Acacia simplex, perennial climbing tree native to islands in the western part of the Pacific Ocean
- Buddleja simplex, a small shrub, probably extinct, as no record of it has been made for nearly 200 years
- Brassaiopsis simplex, a species of plant in the family Araliaceae
- Echium simplex (Tower of jewels), herbaceous biennial plant up to 3 m in height on the island of Tenerife mainly in Macizo de Anaga
- Firmiana simplex, the Chinese parasol tree or wutong, an ornamental plant or tree of the cacao, or chocolate family Sterculiaceae of the order Malvales, native to Asia
- Gentianopsis simplex, a species of flowering plant in the gentian family known by the common name oneflower fringed gentian
- Gymnophragma simplex, a species of flowering plant belonging to the family Acanthaceae
- Pseudopanax simplex, a species of evergreen plant
- Stirlingia simplex, plant endemic to Western Australia
- Thalictrum simplex, a species of plant in the family Ranunculaceae
- Utricularia simplex, commonly known as bluecoats, is a very small perennial carnivorous plant that belongs to the genus Utricularia

== Fungi ==
- Acrodontium simplex, ascomycete fungus that is a plant pathogen
- Pleomeris simplex or Puccinia hordei, a plant pathogen

== Animals ==
=== Cnidaria ===
- Protanthea simplex, a species of sea anemone found in deep water off the coasts of north west Europe
- Tubularia simplex, or oaten pipes hydroid, a species of hydroid native to the northeast Atlantic Ocean, North Sea, Norwegian Sea, and English Channel

=== Molluscs ===
==== Bivalves ====
- Anomia simplex, or the common jingle shell, a species of bivalve mollusc in the family Anomiidae

==== Gastropods (snails and slugs) ====
- Arinia simplex, a species of small land snails with an operculum, terrestrial gastropod mollusks in the family Diplommatinidae
- Bittium simplex, a species of sea snail, a marine gastropod mollusk in the family Cerithiidae
- Blanfordia simplex, a species of land snail that has an operculum, a terrestrial gastropod mollusk in the family Pomatiopsidae
- Boucardicus simplex, a species of land snail with an operculum, a terrestrial gastropod mollusk in the family Cyclophoridae
- Calliostoma simplex, a species of sea snail, a marine gastropod mollusk in the family Calliostomatidae
- Cirsonella simplex, small sea snail, a marine gastropod mollusc in the family Turbinidae
- Cristilabrum simplex, a species of air-breathing land snail, a terrestrial pulmonate gastropod mollusk in the family Camaenidae
- Enatimene simplex, a species of sea snail, a marine gastropod mollusk in the family Muricidae, the murex snails or rock snails
- Eulimella simplex, a species of sea snail, a marine gastropod mollusk in the family Pyramidellidae, the pyrams and their allies
- Janoliva simplex, a species of sea snail, a marine gastropod mollusk in the family Olividae, the olives
- Mohnia simplex, a species of sea snail, a marine gastropod mollusk in the family Buccinidae, the true whelks
- Natica simplex, a species of predatory sea snail, a marine gastropod mollusk in the family Naticidae, the moon snails
- Obesotoma simplex, a species of sea snail, a marine gastropod mollusk in the family Mangeliidae
- Opisthostoma simplex, a species of small land snail with an operculum, a terrestrial gastropod mollusk in the family Diplommatinidae
- Pepta simplex, a species of sea snail, a marine gastropod mollusk in the family Cancellariidae, the nutmeg snails
- Pyrgulopsis simplex or fossil springsnail, a species of small freshwater spring snails, aquatic gastropod mollusks or micromollusks in the family Hydrobiidae
- Serrata simplex, a species of sea snail, a marine gastropod mollusk in the family Marginellidae, the margin snails
- Sukashitrochus simplex or Sukashitrochus morleti, a species of sea snail, a marine gastropod mollusk in the family Scissurellidae

=== Arthropods ===
==== Arachnids ====
- Argiope simplex or Argiope trifasciata, also called banded garden spider in the USA, a species of spider found around the world
- Digamasellus simplex, mite in the family Digamasellidae
- Gamasellus simplex, in the genus of mites in the family Ologamasidae
- Halolaelaps simplex, family of mites in the order Mesostigmata

==== Crustaceans ====
- Acartia simplex, a species of marine copepod belonging to the family Acartiidae
- Asconiscus simplex, the only species in the genus Asconiscus, family of marine isopod crustaceans in the suborder Cymothoida
- Branchinella simplex, a species of crustacean in the family Thamnocephalidae
- Ovatis simplex, a species of crabs in the family Xanthidae, the only species in the genus Ovatis
- Paradiaptomus simplex, a species of copepod in the family Diaptomidae
- Tropodiaptomus simplex, copepod in the family Diaptomidae

==== Insects ====
===== Lepidoptera (butterflies and moths) =====
Moths of the family Noctuidae:

- Achaea simplex, a species of moth of the family Noctuidae
- Avatha simplex, a species of moth of the family Noctuidae
- Cyligramma simplex, moth of the family Noctuidae
- Penicillaria simplex, moth of the family Noctuidae
- Plusia simplex or Anagrapha falcifera, a moth of the family Noctuidae
- Schinia simplex, moth of the family Noctuidae
- Schrankia simplex or Schrankia altivolans, moth of the family Noctuidae
- Speiredonia simplex, a species of moth of the family Noctuidae

Other lepidopterans:

- Aloeides simplex, a butterfly of the family Lycaenidae
- Anatrachyntis simplex, moth in the family Cosmopterigidae
- Azygophleps simplex, moth in the family Cossidae
- Chilo simplex or Chilo suppressalis, moth of the family Crambidae
- Coleophora simplex, moth of the family Coleophoridae
- Endotricha simplex, a species of snout moths in the genus Endotricha
- Eriogaster simplex or Panacela lewinae is a moth of the family Eupterotidae
- Eulophota simplex, a species of snout moths in the genus Eulophota
- Hemistola simplex, moth of the family Geometridae
- Oroplema simplex, a species of moth of the family Uraniidae
- Proutiella simplex, moth of the family Notodontidae

===== Other insects =====
- Anabrus simplex or Mormon cricket, large insect that can grow to almost three inches in length
- Chlaenius simplex, a ground beetle in the large and diverse genus Chlaenius
- Holcobius simplex, beetle species in the family Anobiidae
- Mirosternus simplex, beetle species in the family Anobiidae
- Rhadinosticta simplex or Rhadinosticta, a species of damselfly in the family Isostictidae
- Rhamphomyia simplex, a species of dance fly, in the fly family Empididae
- Thesprotia simplex, common name grass mantis, is a species of praying mantis found in Brazil
- Urophora simplex, a species of tephritid or fruit flies in the genus Urophora of the family Tephritidae

=== Chordates ===
==== Birds ====
- Anthreptes simplex or plain sunbird, a species of bird in the family Nectariniidae
- Calamonastes simplex or grey wren warbler, a species of bird in the family Cisticolidae
- Chlorocichla simplex or simple greenbul, a species of songbird in the family Pycnonotidae
- Columba simplex or lemon dove or cinnamon dove, a bird species in the pigeon family (Columbidae)
- Geoffroyus simplex, blue-collared parrot, simple parrot, lilac-collared song parrot, or lilac-collared Geoffroy's parrot, found in New Guinea
- Myrmothera simplex or tepui antpitta or brown-breasted antpitta, a species of bird in the family Formicariidae
- Pachycephala simplex or grey whistler, a species of bird in the family Pachycephalidae
- Passer simplex or desert sparrow, a bird of the sparrow family Passeridae
- Phaetusa simplex or large-billed tern, a species of tern in the family Sternidae
- Piculus simplex or Rufous-winged Woodpecker, a species of bird in the family Picidae
- Pogoniulus simplex or green tinkerbird, a species of bird in the family Lybiidae
- Pseudotriccus simplex or hazel-fronted pygmy tyrant, a species of bird in the family Tyrannidae
- Pycnonotus simplex or cream-vented bulbul, a species of songbird in the family Pycnonotidae
- Rhytipterna simplex or greyish mourner, a species of bird in the family Tyrannidae
- Sporophila simplex or drab seedeater, a species of bird in the family Thraupidae

==== Other vertebrates ====
- Betta simplex, a species of fish in the family Osphronemidae
- Hesperomys simplex, a species of rodent in the family Cricetidae from south-central South America
- Hyla simplex, a species of frog in the family Hylidae
- Melanophryniscus simplex, a species of toad in the family Bufonidae
- Sarcoglanis simplex, a species of catfish (order Siluriformes) of the family Trichomycteridae, and the only species of the genus Sarcoglanis

== Bacteria ==
- Nemiana simplex, the only species in Nemiana, a genus of simple, sessile organisms possibly a synonym of Beltanella.The species was formerly tentatively classified as a cnidarian.
