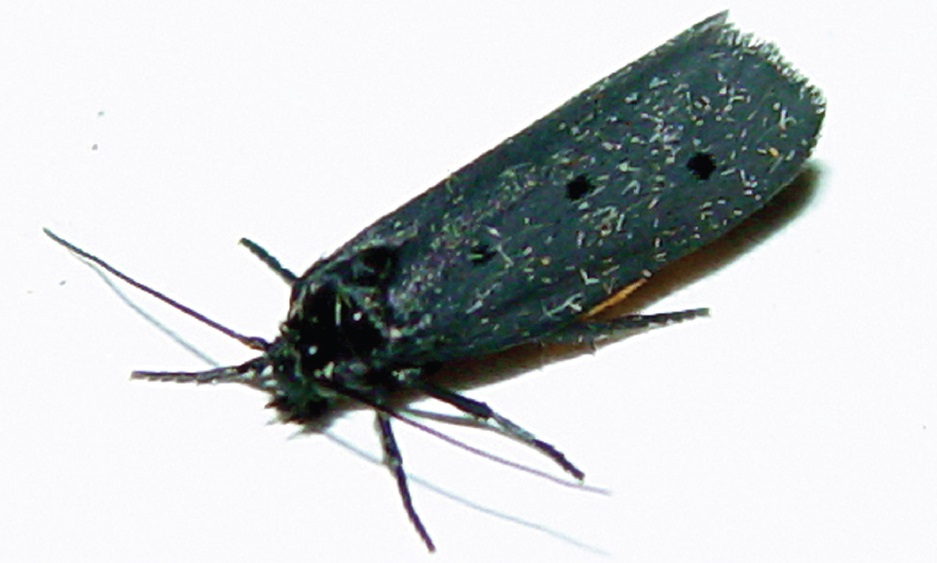

Scientific classification
- Domain: Eukaryota
- Kingdom: Animalia
- Phylum: Arthropoda
- Class: Insecta
- Order: Lepidoptera
- Family: Depressariidae
- Genus: Ethmia
- Species: E. pyrausta

Binomial name
- Ethmia pyrausta (Pallas, 1771)

Synonyms
- Crambus niger (lapsus); Chalybe pyraustella (lapsus); Ethmia atropunctella (Thunberg, 1788); Ethmia nigrella (Fabricius, 1775); Phalaena pyrausta Pallas, 1771; Tinea atropunctella Thunberg, 1788; Tinea nigrella Fabricius, 1775

= Ethmia pyrausta =

Species of moth

Ethmia pyrausta is a moth of the family Depressariidae. It is found in northern Scandinavia and adjacent Russia, as well as in China and Mongolia. The species is sometimes referred to as being "mythical", because it is so rarely encountered outside its remote native range. It is scarce resident in the UK and also found occasionally in other areas in Northern Europe.

== Description and ecology ==
It has black wings and a "hairy" orange body with a wingspan of 17–23 mm (0.67–0.91 in).

Larva live in a thin silky spin between the leaves and flowers of Thalictrum aquilegiifolium, Thalictrum simplex and Thalictrum flavum. There is evidence of breeding in the UK, with larvae found in Easter Ross in 2014.

== Sightings in the UK ==
They were first recorded in the Shin Valley in 1853. Two were found in 1996 on the top of Glas Maol in the Grampians with a further two found nearby.

In June 2008 an adult Ethmia pyrausta moth was discovered in Easter Ross, by Andy Scott and Margaret Currie after finding it trapped in a spider web.

It has since been found in numbers in Easter Ross, with 15 sightings in early 2015.

== Gallery ==
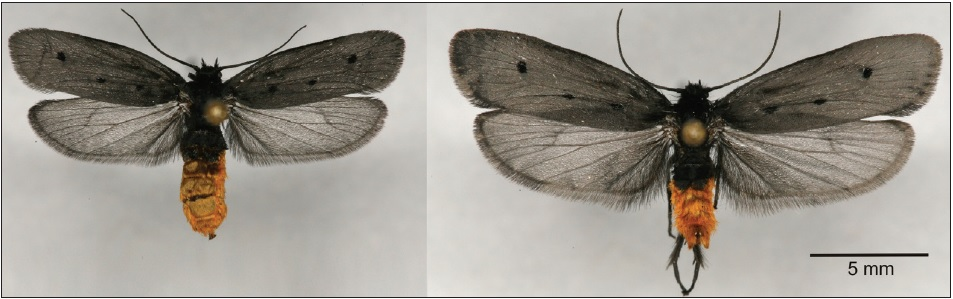
Mounted Adults

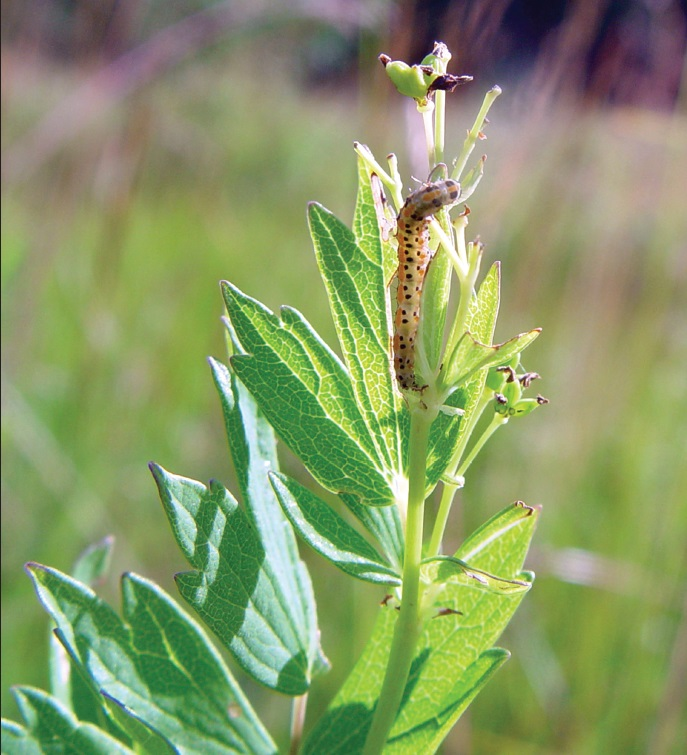
Larva
