= C. miniata =

C. miniata may refer to:

- Calostoma miniata, a mushroom species found in China
- Castilleja miniata, the giant red Indian paintbrush, a flowering plant species native to western North America
- Cephalopholis miniata, the vermillion seabass or coral hind, a fish species
- Clivia miniata, the kaffir lily or bush lily, a plant species from South Africa
- Coelogyne miniata, an orchid species
- Cucumaria miniata, the orange sea cucumber, an echinoderm species

== See also ==
- Miniata
