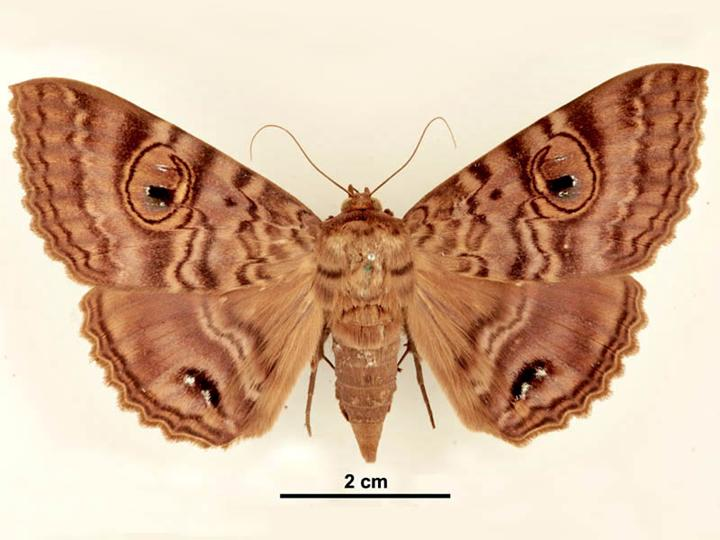
- Speiredonia spectans

Scientific classification
- Kingdom: Animalia
- Phylum: Arthropoda
- Clade: Pancrustacea
- Class: Insecta
- Order: Lepidoptera
- Superfamily: Noctuoidea
- Family: Erebidae
- Tribe: Hulodini
- Genus: Speiredonia; Hübner, [1823]

Synonyms
- Sericia Guenée, 1852; Spiredonia Agassiz, 1847

= Speiredonia =

Genus of moths

Speiredonia is a genus of moths in the family Erebidae. It was first described by Jacob Hübner in 1823.

== Description ==
Palpi with thickened second joint, reaching vertex of head and third joint of moderate length. Antennae of male with minute fascicules of cilia. Thorax quadrately scaled. Abdomen with dorsal ridges of hair. Tibia slightly hairy, and mid-tibia spineless. Forewings with arched costa towards apex. Cilia crenulate. Hindwings with crenulate cilia as well, but with short cell. Vein 5 from lower angle of cell.

== Defensive display ==
Some of the species, such as Speiredonia spectans, S. cthulhui, S. hogenesi, S. martabanica, S. sandokana, S. alix. S. itynx, S. levis and S. celebensis have a pattern on the wings that while the moth is at rest looks like the 3-dimensional face of a lurking animal with eyes and nostrils. This pattern is more clearly discernible in females and may cause an attacking predator to hesitate or perhaps withdraw.

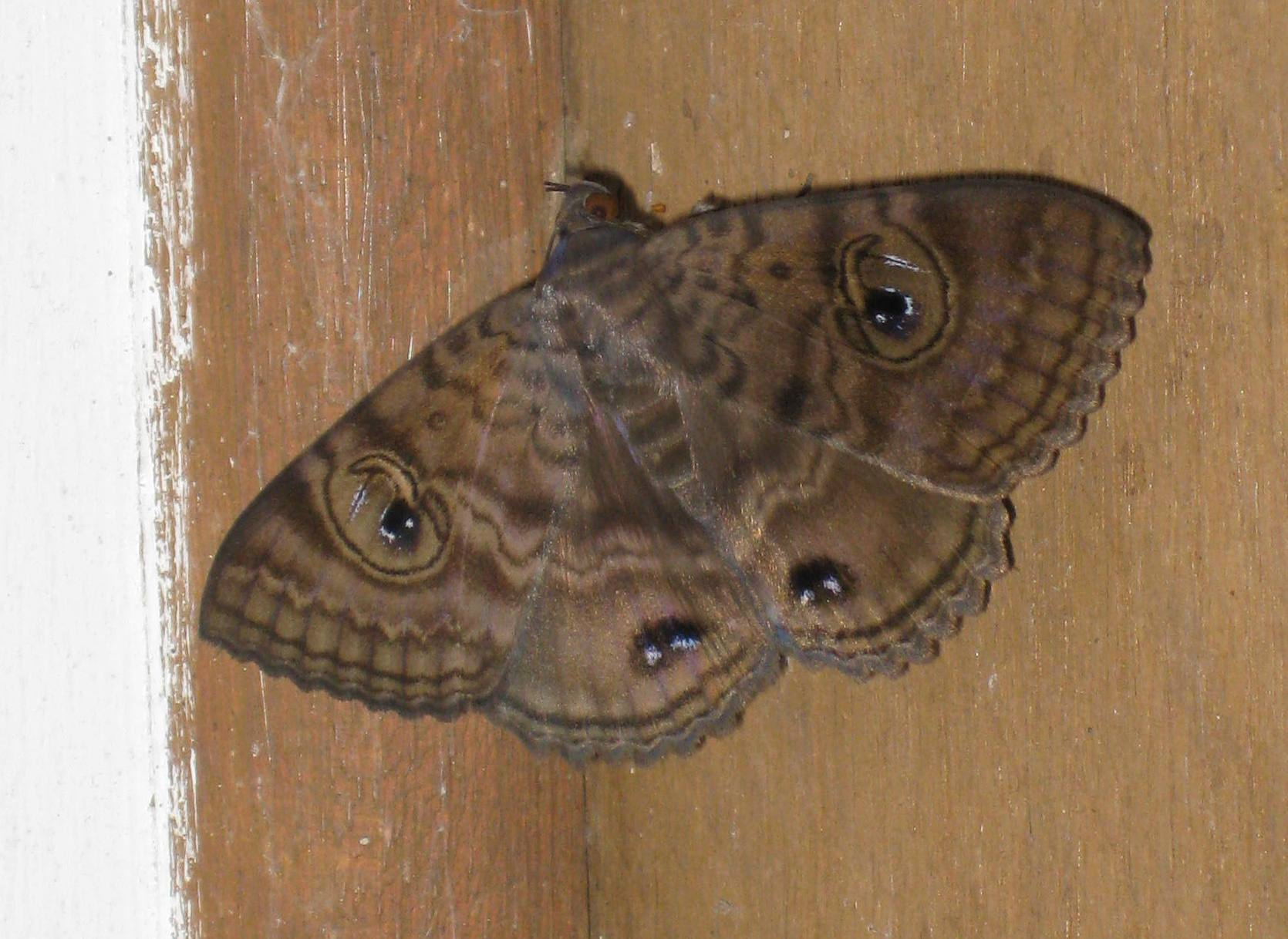
Speiredonia spectans resting, mimicking a head

== Species ==
- Speiredonia alix (Guenée, 1852)
- Speiredonia celebensis Hogenes & Zilli, 2005
- Speiredonia cthulhui Zilli & Holloway, 2005
- Speiredonia cymosema (Hampson, 1926)
- Speiredonia darwiniana Zilli, 2010
- Speiredonia gowa Holloway & Zilli, 2005
- Speiredonia hogenesi Zilli, 2002
- Speiredonia ibanorum Holloway & Zilli, 2005
- Speiredonia inocellata Sugi, 1996
- Speiredonia itynx Fabricius, 1787
- Speiredonia levis Holloway & Zilli, 2005
- Speiredonia martabanica Holloway & Zilli, 2005
- Speiredonia mutabilis Fabricius, 1794
- Speiredonia obscura (Cramer, 1780)
- Speiredonia sandokana Zilli & Holloway, 2005
- Speiredonia simplex Butler, 1877
- Speiredonia spectans (Guenée, 1852) – granny's cloak moth
- Speiredonia strigiformis (Robinson, 1975)
- Speiredonia substruens (Walker, 1858)
