= Penicillaria ludatrix =

Scientific classification
- Kingdom: Animalia
- Phylum: Arthropoda
- Class: Insecta
- Order: Lepidoptera
- Superfamily: Noctuoidea
- Family: Euteliidae
- Genus: Penicillaria
- Species: P. ludatrix

Binomial name
- Penicillaria ludatrix Walker, 1858

Synonyms
- Targalla ludatrix (Walker, 1858)

Species of moth

Penicillaria ludatrix is a moth of the family Euteliidae first described by Francis Walker in 1858. It is found in Sri Lanka.
