= Speiredonia levis =

Scientific classification
- Kingdom: Animalia
- Phylum: Arthropoda
- Clade: Pancrustacea
- Class: Insecta
- Order: Lepidoptera
- Superfamily: Noctuoidea
- Family: Erebidae
- Genus: Speiredonia
- Species: S. levis

Binomial name
- Speiredonia levis Zilli & Holloway, 2005

Species of moth

Speiredonia levis is a species of moth of the family Erebidae first described by Alberto Zilli and Jeremy Daniel Holloway in 2005. It is found on Timor in Maritime Southeast Asia.

The length of the forewings is 27.5 mm for males and 26 mm for females.
