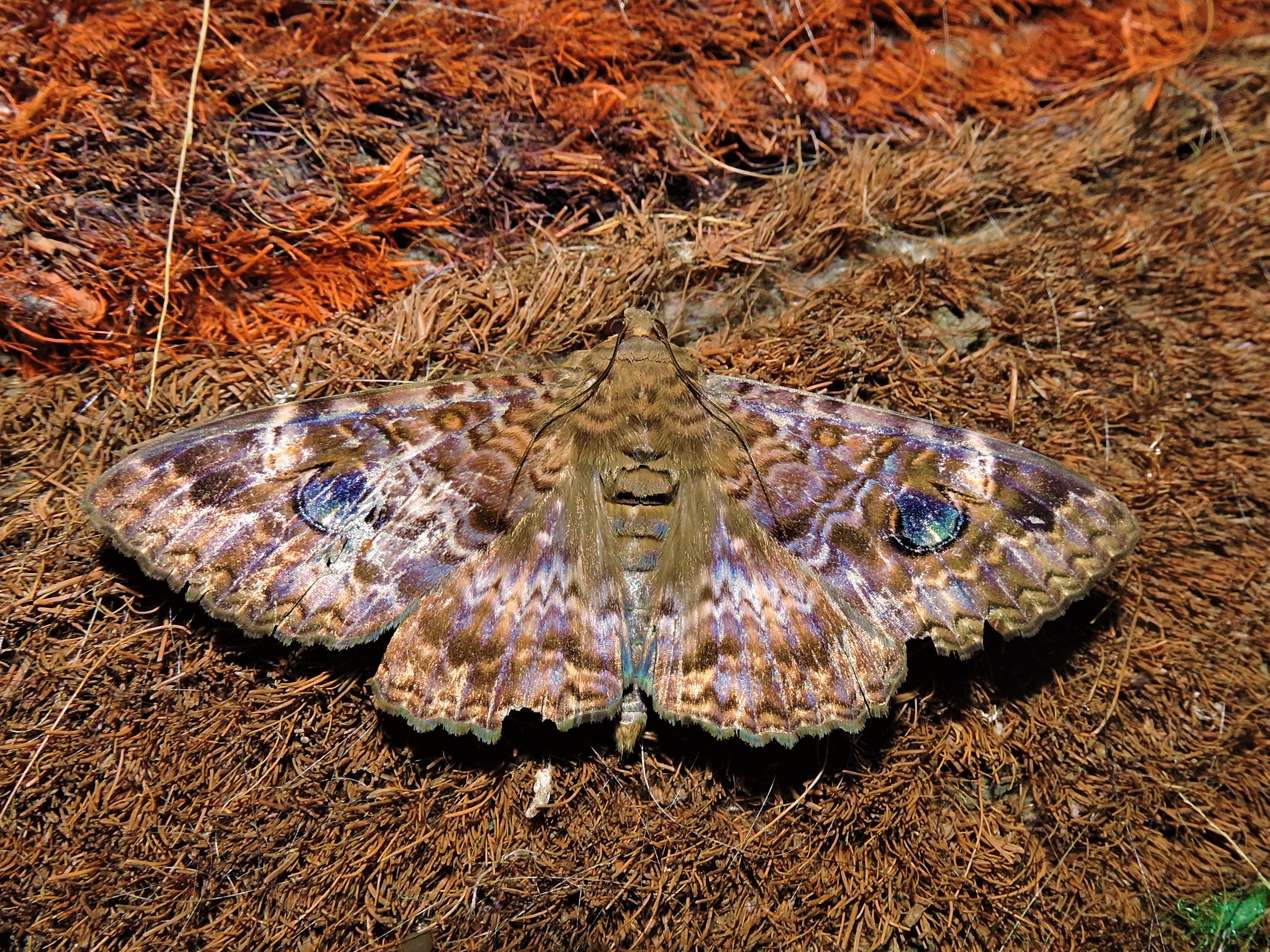

Scientific classification
- Kingdom: Animalia
- Phylum: Arthropoda
- Class: Insecta
- Order: Lepidoptera
- Superfamily: Noctuoidea
- Family: Erebidae
- Genus: Speiredonia
- Species: S. cymosema

Binomial name
- Speiredonia cymosema (Hampson, 1926)

Synonyms
- Sericia cymosema Hampson, 1926

= Speiredonia cymosema =

Species of moth

Speiredonia cymosema is a species of moth of the family Erebidae first described by George Hampson in 1926. It is found in Assam, Sikkim and Malaya.
