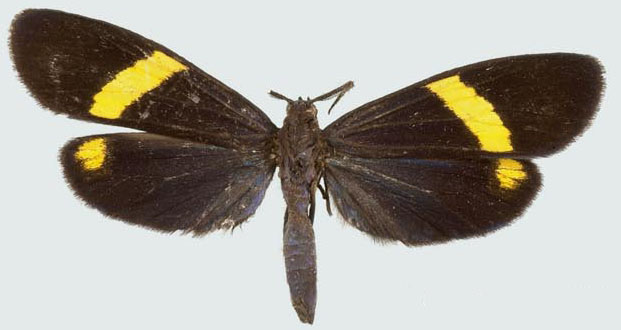

Scientific classification
- Kingdom: Animalia
- Phylum: Arthropoda
- Clade: Pancrustacea
- Class: Insecta
- Order: Lepidoptera
- Superfamily: Noctuoidea
- Family: Notodontidae
- Genus: Proutiella
- Species: P. repetita

Binomial name
- Proutiella repetita (Warren, 1905)

Synonyms
- Ephialtias repetita Warren, 1905

= Proutiella repetita =

Species of moth

Proutiella repetita is a species of rare moth of the family Notodontidae. It seems to be endemic to eastern Colombia, and is only known from fifteen specimens.
