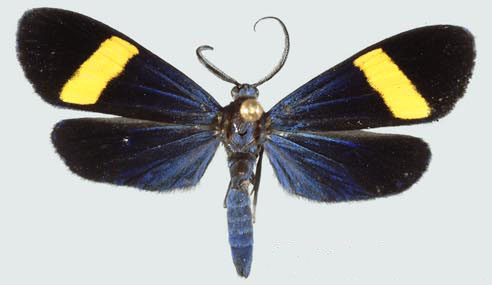

Scientific classification
- Kingdom: Animalia
- Phylum: Arthropoda
- Clade: Pancrustacea
- Class: Insecta
- Order: Lepidoptera
- Superfamily: Noctuoidea
- Family: Notodontidae
- Genus: Proutiella
- Species: P. ilaire

Binomial name
- Proutiella ilaire (Druce, 1885)

Synonyms
- Ephialtias ilaire Druce, 1885

= Proutiella ilaire =

Species of moth

Proutiella ilaire is a moth of the family Notodontidae. It is found from Panama and Costa Rica to Colombia.
