= Speiredonia alix =

Scientific classification
- Kingdom: Animalia
- Phylum: Arthropoda
- Class: Insecta
- Order: Lepidoptera
- Superfamily: Noctuoidea
- Family: Erebidae
- Genus: Speiredonia
- Species: S. alix

Binomial name
- Speiredonia alix (Guenée, 1852)

Synonyms
- Spiredonia alix Guenée, 1852; Syrnia sparsa Walker, 1858; Sericia calamistrata Moore, 1883

Species of moth

Speiredonia alix is a species of moth of the family Erebidae first described by Achille Guenée in 1852. It is found in India, the Andamans, Malaya, Sumatra, Borneo, Java, Sumbawa and the Philippines.
