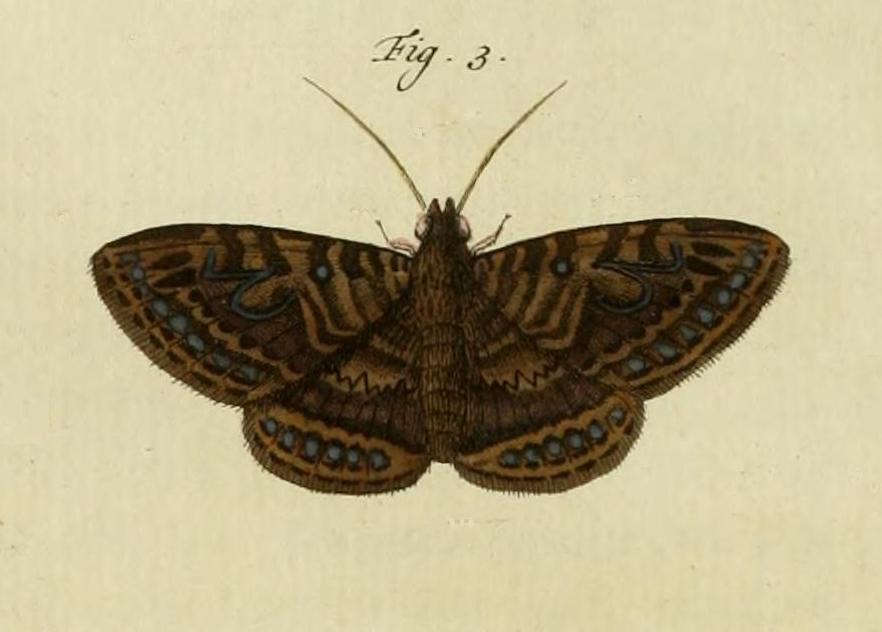
- Plate XXXVI of Cramer & Stoll's De uitlandsche kapellen

Scientific classification
- Domain: Eukaryota
- Kingdom: Animalia
- Phylum: Arthropoda
- Class: Insecta
- Order: Lepidoptera
- Superfamily: Noctuoidea
- Family: Erebidae
- Genus: Speiredonia
- Species: S. itynx

Binomial name
- Speiredonia itynx (Fabricius, 1787)

Synonyms
- Noctua itynx Fabricius, 1787; Phalaena Noctua feducia Stoll, 1790; Sericia parvipennis Walker, 1858

= Speiredonia itynx =

Species of moth

Speiredonia itynx is a species of moth of the family Erebidae first described by Johan Christian Fabricius in 1787. It is found in India, Sri Lanka, Vietnam, Java, Palawan, Sulawesi and the Moluccas.

== Description ==
Their wingspan ranges from 64 to 78 mm. The middle loop of the forewing is produced inwards almost to the discocellulars. There is a rufous spot found on the cell. Specimens very greatly in colour and spots. Some have purplish-grey patches on both wings, and some have ochreous patches on disk and centre of margin of both wings. Another morph has ochreous or white suffusion on sub-marginal area of forewings and postmedial area of hindwings.
