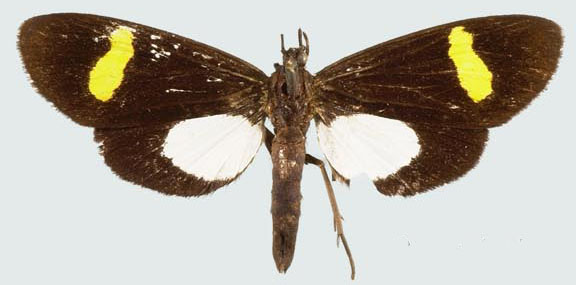
- Proutiella esoterica

Scientific classification
- Kingdom: Animalia
- Phylum: Arthropoda
- Clade: Pancrustacea
- Class: Insecta
- Order: Lepidoptera
- Superfamily: Noctuoidea
- Family: Notodontidae
- Tribe: Josiini
- Genus: Proutiella; J.S. Miller, 2009

= Proutiella =

Genus of moths

Proutiella is a genus of moths of the family Notodontidae. It consists of these species:

- Proutiella esoterica (Prout, 1918)
- Proutiella ilaire (Druce, 1885)
- Proutiella infans (Walker, 1856)
- Proutiella jordani (Hering, 1925)
- Proutiella latifascia (Prout, 1920)
- Proutiella repetita (Warren, 1905)
- Proutiella simplex (Walker, 1856)
- Proutiella tegyra (Druce, 1899)
- Proutiella vittula (Hübner, 1823)
