= Speiredonia inocellata =

Scientific classification
- Kingdom: Animalia
- Phylum: Arthropoda
- Clade: Pancrustacea
- Class: Insecta
- Order: Lepidoptera
- Superfamily: Noctuoidea
- Family: Erebidae
- Genus: Speiredonia
- Species: S. inocellata

Binomial name
- Speiredonia inocellata Sugi, 1996

Species of moth

Speiredonia inocellata is a species of moth of the family Erebidae first described by Shigero Sugi in 1996. It is found on Japan's Ogasawara Islands.
