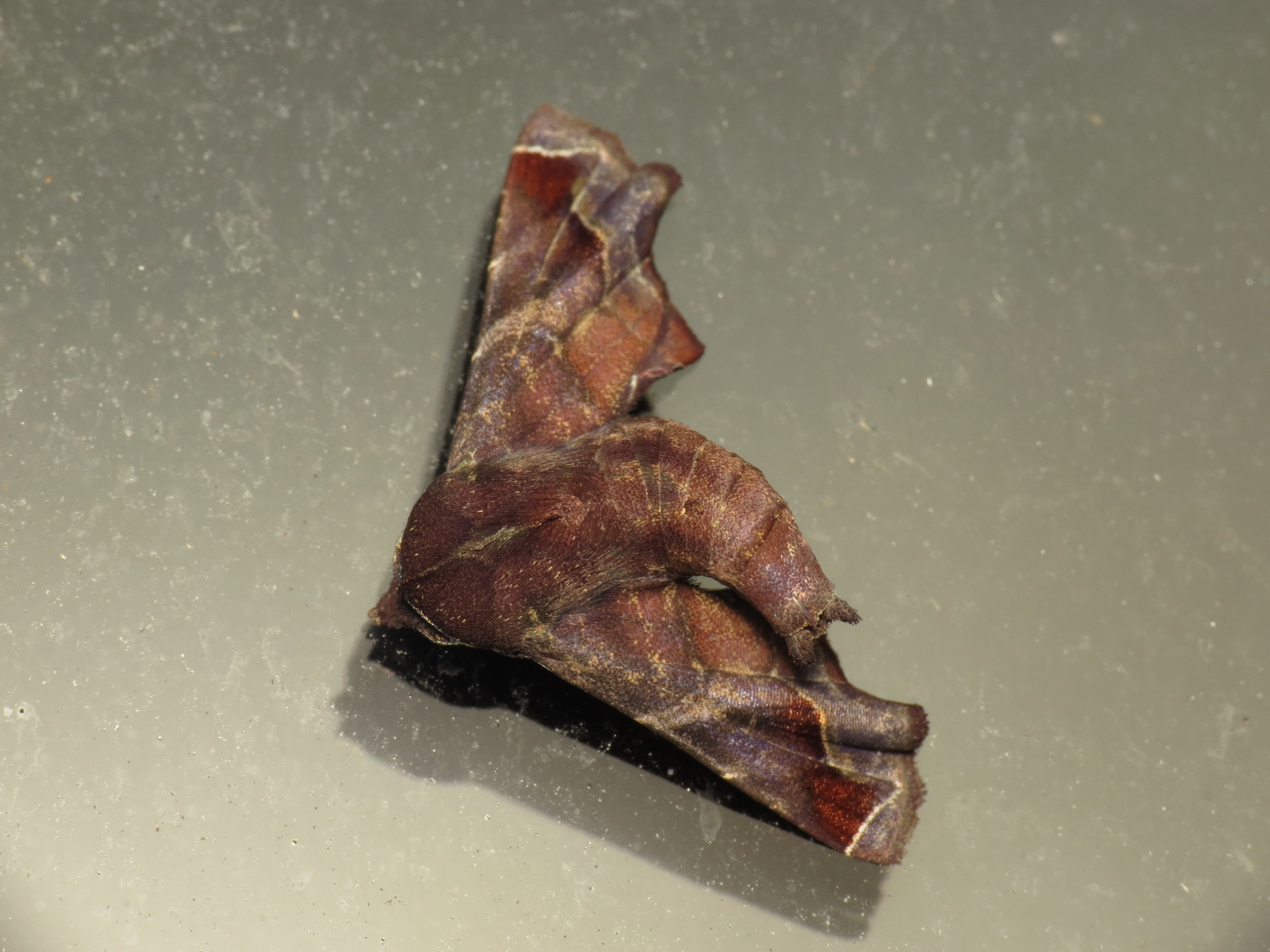
- Penicillaria jocosatrix

Scientific classification
- Kingdom: Animalia
- Phylum: Arthropoda
- Class: Insecta
- Order: Lepidoptera
- Superfamily: Noctuoidea
- Family: Euteliidae
- Subfamily: Euteliinae
- Genus: Penicillaria; Guenée, 1852

Synonyms
- Eleale Walker, 1862; Tibiocillaria Bethune-Baker, 1906; Bombotelia Hampson, 1912; Tamseale Nye, 1975

= Penicillaria (moth) =

Genus of moths

Penicillaria is a genus of moths of the family Euteliidae. The genus was erected by Achille Guenée in 1852.

== Species ==
- Penicillaria aureiplaga (Bethune-Baker, 1906) New Guinea
- Penicillaria dinawa Bethune-Baker, 1906 New Guinea
- Penicillaria dinawaensis (Bethune-Baker, 1906) New Guinea
- Penicillaria dorsipuncta (Hampson, 1912) Singapore, Sundaland - New Guinea, Queensland
- Penicillaria ethiopica (Hampson, 1920) South Africa
- Penicillaria jocosatrix Guenée, 1852 Indo-Australian tropics, Hawaii (introduced)
- Penicillaria ludatrix Walker, 1858 Sri Lanka
- Penicillaria lineatrix Walker, 1858 Canara
- Penicillaria maculata Butler, 1889 Oriental tropics, Sundaland, New Caledonia, Vanuatu
- Penicillaria magnifica (Robinson, 1975) Fiji
- Penicillaria meeki Bethune-Baker, 1906 Peninsular Malaysia, Sumatra, Borneo, New Guinea, Bismarcks, Solomons, Fiji, Samoa
- Penicillaria nigriplaga (Warren, 1914) New Guinea
- Penicillaria nugatrix Guenée, 1852 India
- Penicillaria plusioides (Walker, 1862) Oriental tropics, Sundaland, Bismarcks
- Penicillaria pratti (Bethune-Baker, 1906) New Guinea
- Penicillaria regalis (Prout, 1921) Amboina
- Penicillaria rothschildi (Warren, 1914) New Guinea
- Penicillaria simplex (Walker, 1865) Oriental tropics - New Guinea, Kuangtung
