= Speiredonia hogenesi =

Scientific classification
- Domain: Eukaryota
- Kingdom: Animalia
- Phylum: Arthropoda
- Class: Insecta
- Order: Lepidoptera
- Superfamily: Noctuoidea
- Family: Erebidae
- Genus: Speiredonia
- Species: S. hogenesi

Binomial name
- Speiredonia hogenesi Zilli, 2002

Species of moth

Speiredonia hogenesi is a species of moth of the family Erebidae first described by Alberto Zilli in 2002. It is found in Malaya, Sumatra, Java and Borneo.
