= Speiredonia gowa =

Scientific classification
- Kingdom: Animalia
- Phylum: Arthropoda
- Clade: Pancrustacea
- Class: Insecta
- Order: Lepidoptera
- Superfamily: Noctuoidea
- Family: Erebidae
- Genus: Speiredonia
- Species: S. gowa

Binomial name
- Speiredonia gowa Zilli & Holloway, 2005

Species of moth

Speiredonia gowa is a species of moth of the family Erebidae first described by Alberto Zilli and Jeremy Daniel Holloway in 2005. It is found in the northern Moluccas and Sulawesi.

The length of the forewings is 24-24.5 mm for males.
