= Speiredonia ibanorum =

Scientific classification
- Kingdom: Animalia
- Phylum: Arthropoda
- Clade: Pancrustacea
- Class: Insecta
- Order: Lepidoptera
- Superfamily: Noctuoidea
- Family: Erebidae
- Genus: Speiredonia
- Species: S. ibanorum

Binomial name
- Speiredonia ibanorum Zilli & Holloway, 2005

Species of moth

Speiredonia ibanorum is a species of moth of the family Erebidae first described by Alberto Zilli and Jeremy Daniel Holloway in 2005. It is found on Borneo.

The length of the forewings is 24.5 mm for males and 27.5 mm for females.
