= Mirosternus affinis =

Scientific classification
- Kingdom: Animalia
- Phylum: Arthropoda
- Clade: Pancrustacea
- Class: Insecta
- Order: Coleoptera
- Suborder: Polyphaga
- Family: Ptinidae
- Genus: Mirosternus
- Species: M. affinis

Binomial name
- Mirosternus affinis Perkins, 1910

Species of beetle

Mirosternus affinis is a species of beetle in the family Ptinidae.

== Subspecies ==
These two subspecies belong to the species Mirosternus affinis:

- Mirosternus affinis affinis Perkins, 1910^{i c g}
- Mirosternus affinis suturalis Perkins, 1910^{i c g}

Data sources: i = ITIS, c = Catalogue of Life, g = GBIF, b = Bugguide.net
