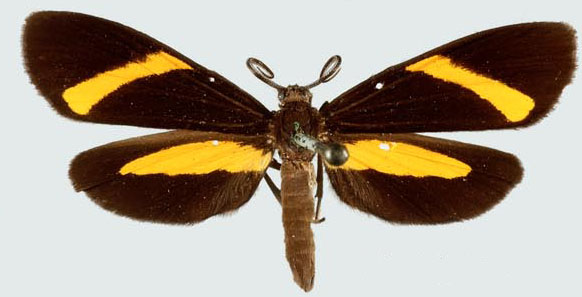

Scientific classification
- Kingdom: Animalia
- Phylum: Arthropoda
- Clade: Pancrustacea
- Class: Insecta
- Order: Lepidoptera
- Superfamily: Noctuoidea
- Family: Notodontidae
- Genus: Proutiella
- Species: P. vittula

Binomial name
- Proutiella vittula (Hübner, 1823)

Synonyms
- Ephialtias vittula Hübner, 1823; Josia adiante Walker, 1854; Ephialtias carneata Warren, 1901

= Proutiella vittula =

Species of moth

Proutiella vittula is a moth of the family Notodontidae. It is endemic to the Atlantic coastal forest of Brazil.
