= Mirosternus acutus =

Scientific classification
- Kingdom: Animalia
- Phylum: Arthropoda
- Clade: Pancrustacea
- Class: Insecta
- Order: Coleoptera
- Suborder: Polyphaga
- Family: Ptinidae
- Genus: Mirosternus
- Species: M. acutus

Binomial name
- Mirosternus acutus Blackburn, 1885

Species of beetle

Mirosternus acutus is a species of beetle in the family Ptinidae.
