= Speiredonia martabanica =

Scientific classification
- Kingdom: Animalia
- Phylum: Arthropoda
- Clade: Pancrustacea
- Class: Insecta
- Order: Lepidoptera
- Superfamily: Noctuoidea
- Family: Erebidae
- Genus: Speiredonia
- Species: S. martabanica

Binomial name
- Speiredonia martabanica Zilli & Holloway, 2005

Species of moth

Speiredonia martabanica is a species of moth of the family Erebidae first described by Alberto Zilli and Jeremy Daniel Holloway in 2005. It is found in Myanmar.

The length of the forewings is 28 mm for males.
