= Mirosternus carinatus =

Scientific classification
- Kingdom: Animalia
- Phylum: Arthropoda
- Clade: Pancrustacea
- Class: Insecta
- Order: Coleoptera
- Suborder: Polyphaga
- Family: Ptinidae
- Subfamily: Dorcatominae
- Tribe: Mirosternini
- Genus: Mirosternus
- Species: M. carinatus

Binomial name
- Mirosternus carinatus Sharp, 1881

Species of beetle

Mirosternus carinatus is a species of beetle in the family Ptinidae, found in Hawaii.
