= Speiredonia celebensis =

Scientific classification
- Domain: Eukaryota
- Kingdom: Animalia
- Phylum: Arthropoda
- Class: Insecta
- Order: Lepidoptera
- Superfamily: Noctuoidea
- Family: Erebidae
- Genus: Speiredonia
- Species: S. celebensis

Binomial name
- Speiredonia celebensis Hogenes & Zilli, 2005

Species of moth

Speiredonia celebensis is a species of moth of the family Erebidae first described by Willem Hogenes and Alberto Zilli in 2005. It is found on Sulawesi and the Moluccas.

The length of the forewings is 28–30 mm for males and 27–30 mm for females.
