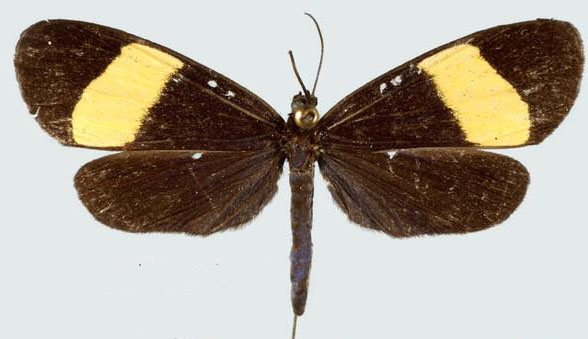

Scientific classification
- Kingdom: Animalia
- Phylum: Arthropoda
- Clade: Pancrustacea
- Class: Insecta
- Order: Lepidoptera
- Superfamily: Noctuoidea
- Family: Notodontidae
- Genus: Proutiella
- Species: P. latifascia

Binomial name
- Proutiella latifascia (Prout, 1920)

Synonyms
- Ephialtias lativitta Warren, 1901 (invalid secondary junior homonym of Josia lativitta Walker 1869); Josia latifascia Prout, 1920 (Replacement name for Ephialtias lativitta Warren, 1901); Josia (Phintia) turbida Hering, 1925

= Proutiella latifascia =

Species of moth

Proutiella latifascia is a moth of the family Notodontidae. It is found on the western slope of the Colombian and Ecuadorean Andes.
