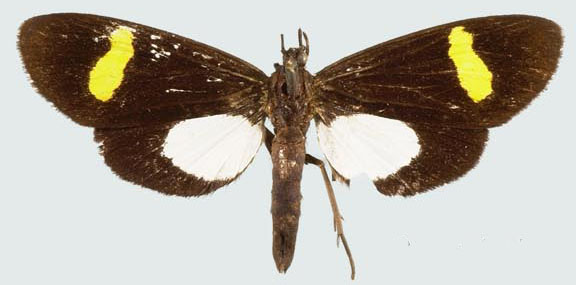

Scientific classification
- Kingdom: Animalia
- Phylum: Arthropoda
- Clade: Pancrustacea
- Class: Insecta
- Order: Lepidoptera
- Superfamily: Noctuoidea
- Family: Notodontidae
- Genus: Proutiella
- Species: P. esoterica

Binomial name
- Proutiella esoterica (Prout, 1918)

Synonyms
- Josia (Phintia) esoterica Prout, 1918

= Proutiella esoterica =

Species of moth

Proutiella esoterica is a moth of the family Notodontidae. It is only known from Ecuador.

The length of the forewings is about 15.5 mm
