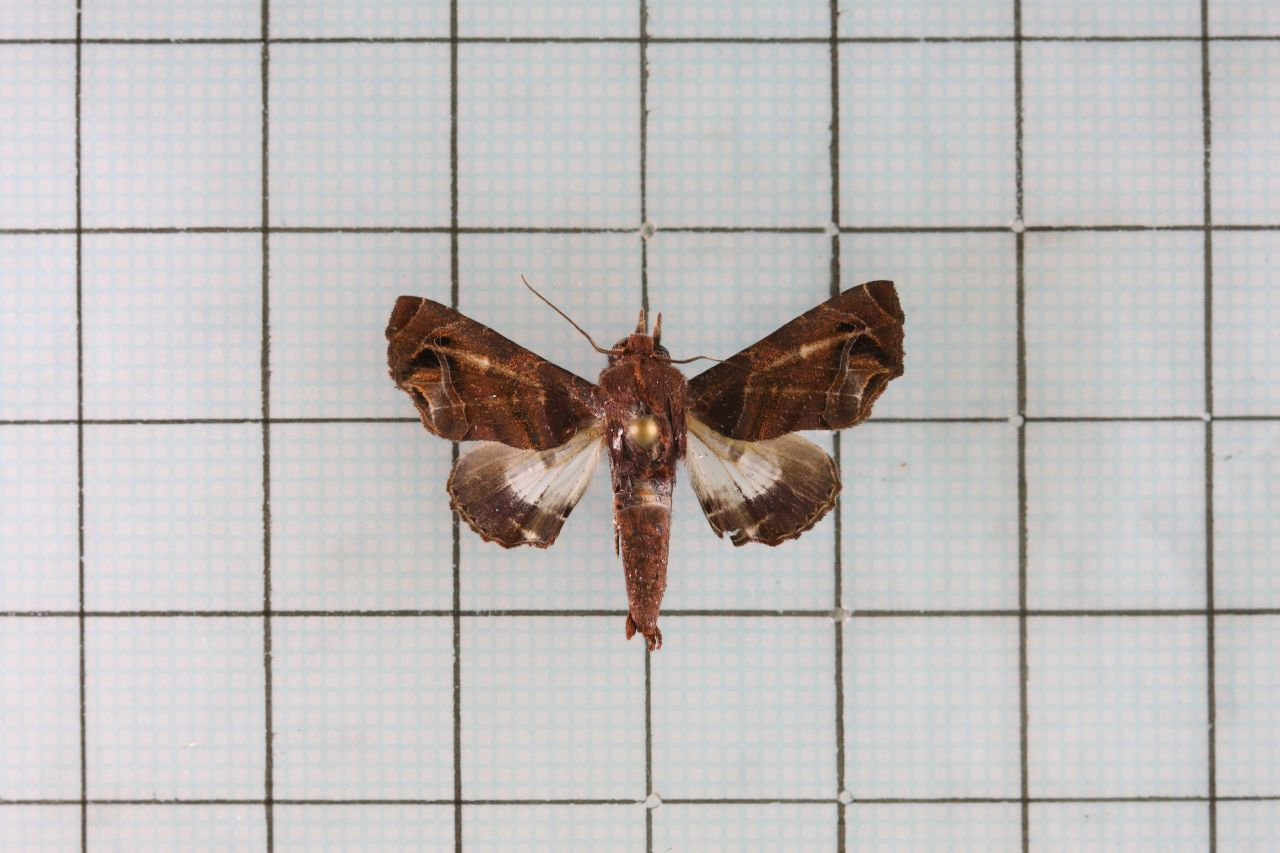

Scientific classification
- Kingdom: Animalia
- Phylum: Arthropoda
- Class: Insecta
- Order: Lepidoptera
- Superfamily: Noctuoidea
- Family: Euteliidae
- Genus: Penicillaria
- Species: P. maculata

Binomial name
- Penicillaria maculata Butler, 1889

Synonyms
- Penicillaria richardsoni Holloway, 1977; Bombotelia maculata

= Penicillaria maculata =

Species of moth

Penicillaria maculata is a moth of the family Euteliidae first described by Arthur Gardiner Butler in 1889. It is found throughout the Indo-Australian tropics, Vanuatu and New Caledonia.
