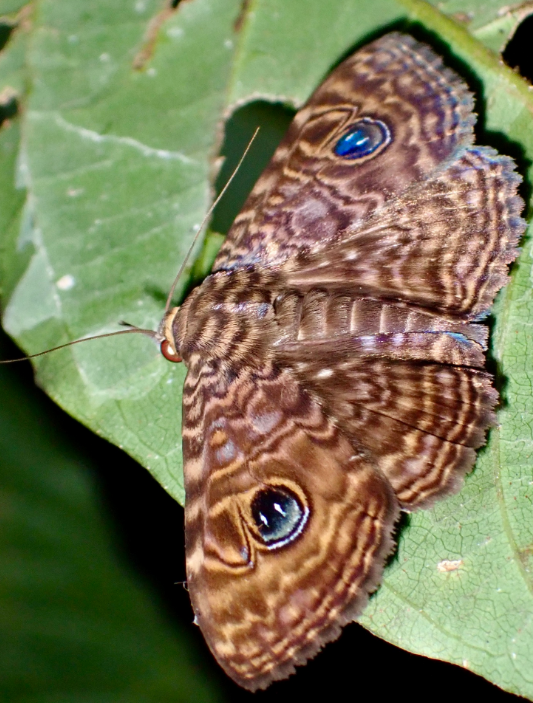

Scientific classification
- Kingdom: Animalia
- Phylum: Arthropoda
- Clade: Pancrustacea
- Class: Insecta
- Order: Lepidoptera
- Superfamily: Noctuoidea
- Family: Erebidae
- Genus: Speiredonia
- Species: S. cthulhui

Binomial name
- Speiredonia cthulhui Zilli & Holloway, 2005

= Speiredonia cthulhui =

Species of moth

Speiredonia cthulhui is a species of moth of the family Erebidae first described by Alberto Zilli and Jeremy D. Holloway in 2005. It is found on New Guinea.

The length of the forewings is 26.5 mm for males and 25.5 mm for females.

It is named after Cthulhu, a fictional creature created by author H. P. Lovecraft.
