= Penicillaria lineatrix =

Scientific classification
- Kingdom: Animalia
- Phylum: Arthropoda
- Clade: Pancrustacea
- Class: Insecta
- Order: Lepidoptera
- Superfamily: Noctuoidea
- Family: Euteliidae
- Genus: Penicillaria
- Species: P. lineatrix

Binomial name
- Penicillaria lineatrix Walker, 1858

Species of moth

Penicillaria lineatrix is a moth of the family Euteliidae first described by Francis Walker in 1858. It is found in India and Sri Lanka.

Male antennae bipectinate (comb like on both sides). Forewings with an obtuse marginal central angle. Hindwings basally white with broad border.
