= Mirosternus excelsior =

Scientific classification
- Kingdom: Animalia
- Phylum: Arthropoda
- Clade: Pancrustacea
- Class: Insecta
- Order: Coleoptera
- Suborder: Polyphaga
- Family: Ptinidae
- Genus: Mirosternus
- Species: M. excelsior

Binomial name
- Mirosternus excelsior Perkins, 1910

Species of beetle

Mirosternus excelsior is a species of beetle in the family Ptinidae.
