= Speiredonia substruens =

Scientific classification
- Kingdom: Animalia
- Phylum: Arthropoda
- Class: Insecta
- Order: Lepidoptera
- Superfamily: Noctuoidea
- Family: Erebidae
- Genus: Speiredonia
- Species: S. substruens

Binomial name
- Speiredonia substruens (Walker, 1858)

Synonyms
- Tavia substruens Walker, 1858

Species of moth

Speiredonia substruens is a species of moth of the family Erebidae first described by Francis Walker in 1858. It is found in India.
