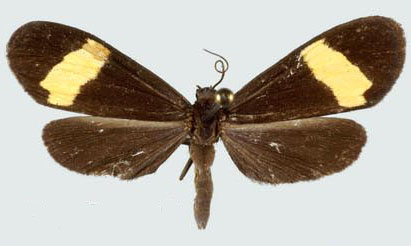

Scientific classification
- Kingdom: Animalia
- Phylum: Arthropoda
- Clade: Pancrustacea
- Class: Insecta
- Order: Lepidoptera
- Superfamily: Noctuoidea
- Family: Notodontidae
- Genus: Proutiella
- Species: P. infans

Binomial name
- Proutiella infans (Walker, 1856)

Synonyms
- Scea infans Walker, 1856

= Proutiella infans =

Species of moth

Proutiella infans is a moth of the family Notodontidae. It is only known from in lowland Amazonia in Brazil.
