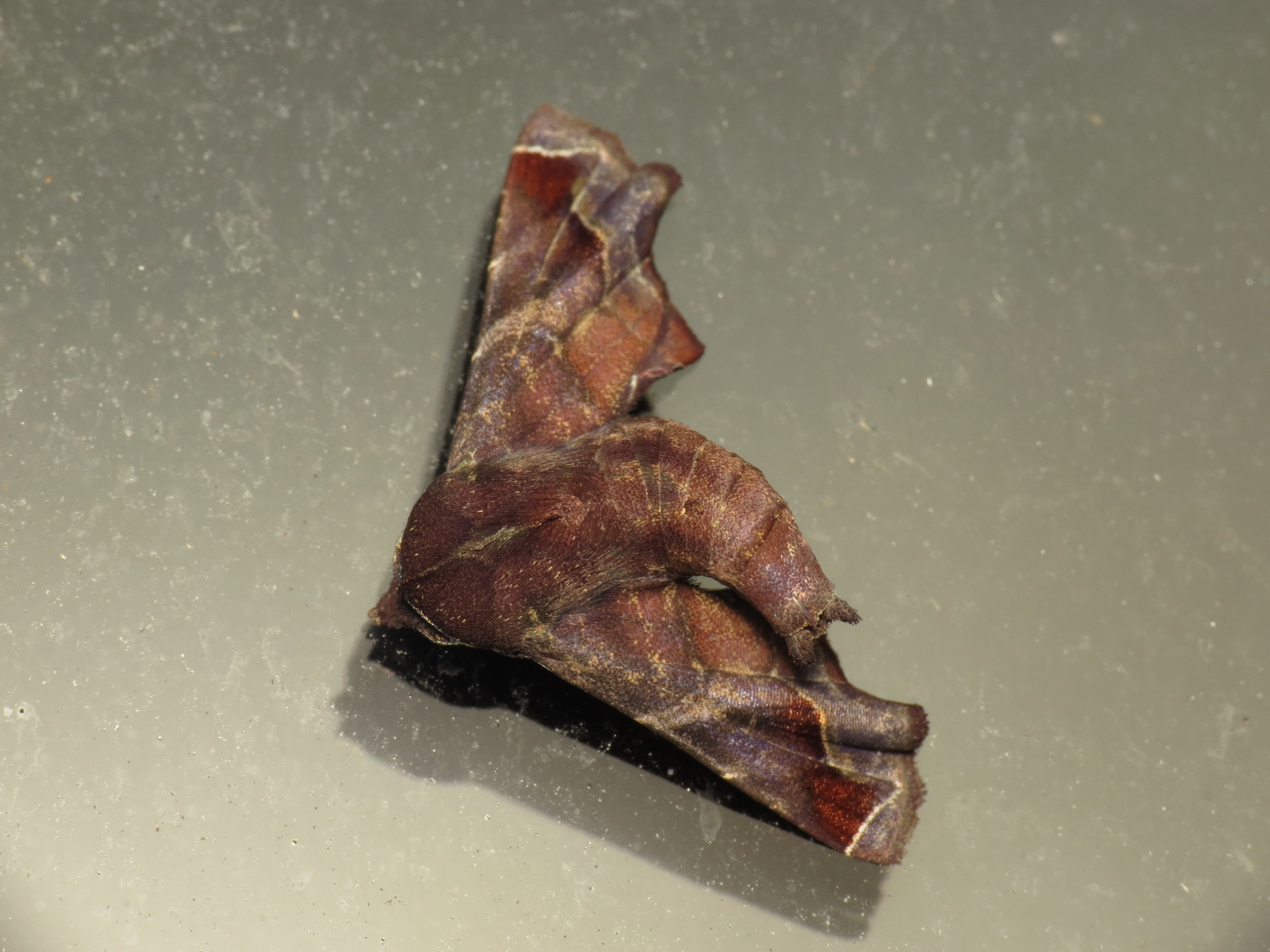

Scientific classification
- Kingdom: Animalia
- Phylum: Arthropoda
- Class: Insecta
- Order: Lepidoptera
- Superfamily: Noctuoidea
- Family: Euteliidae
- Genus: Penicillaria
- Species: P. jocosatrix

Binomial name
- Penicillaria jocosatrix Guenée, 1852

Synonyms
- Bombotelia jocosatrix

= Penicillaria jocosatrix =

Species of moth

Penicillaria jocosatrix, the mango shoot borer, is a moth of the family Euteliidae first described by Achille Guenée in 1852. It is found from southeast Asia to the Pacific. Records include Borneo, Guam, Hawaii, India, Sri Lanka, Thailand and in Australia, Western Australia, the Northern Territory and Queensland.

== Description ==
The wingspan is about 20–30 mm. It is dark purplish red brown. Forewings with traces of sub-basal line, an indistinct antemedial line angled on median nervure and a postmedial line angled beyond cell with chocolate below the angle. It joint by a chocolate patch from costa inside the indistinct sub-marginal angled white line. There is a pale streak and slight fold from centre of cell to outer margin. Hindwings white, with dark cell spot. Outer are purplish brown. Underside with prominent black cell spot.

Eggs are pale blue green. Larva green with sub-lateral dark stria. Somites with small purple spots and a sub-dorsal series of larger spots. There are few hairs arise from spiracles. Larva completes five instars to become a pupa. Pupa dark brown, much round with no distinguishing lumps or lobes.

== Attack and control ==
Fruits, inflorescences and leaves are attacked by the caterpillars. It is a minor pest attacking many cultivated crops. Caterpillars harm the plant parts by external feeding, and few borings.

Biological control is the most successful method. Parasitoids like Trichogramma platneri, Aleiodes circumscriptus, Blepharella lateralis and Euplectrus parvulus are used. Chemicals are also used in cultivations.
