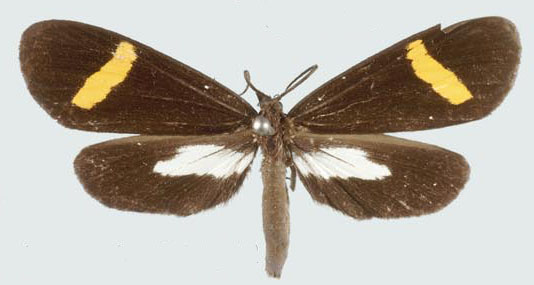

Scientific classification
- Kingdom: Animalia
- Phylum: Arthropoda
- Clade: Pancrustacea
- Class: Insecta
- Order: Lepidoptera
- Superfamily: Noctuoidea
- Family: Notodontidae
- Genus: Proutiella
- Species: P. jordani

Binomial name
- Proutiella jordani (Hering, 1925)

Synonyms
- Josia (Phintia) jordani Hering, 1925

= Proutiella jordani =

Species of moth

Proutiella jordani is a moth of the family Notodontidae first described by Hering in 1925.

== Etymology ==
It is named for the German-British entomologist Karl Jordan.
