= Speiredonia strigiformis =

Scientific classification
- Domain: Eukaryota
- Kingdom: Animalia
- Phylum: Arthropoda
- Class: Insecta
- Order: Lepidoptera
- Superfamily: Noctuoidea
- Family: Erebidae
- Genus: Speiredonia
- Species: S. strigiformis

Binomial name
- Speiredonia strigiformis (Robinson, 1975)

Synonyms
- Sericia strigiformis Robinson, 1975

Species of moth

Speiredonia strigiformis is a species of moth of the family Erebidae first described by Robinson in 1975. It is found on Fiji.
