= Speiredonia sandokana =

Scientific classification
- Kingdom: Animalia
- Phylum: Arthropoda
- Clade: Pancrustacea
- Class: Insecta
- Order: Lepidoptera
- Superfamily: Noctuoidea
- Family: Erebidae
- Genus: Speiredonia
- Species: S. sandokana

Binomial name
- Speiredonia sandokana Zilli & Holloway, 2005

Species of moth

Speiredonia sandokana is a species of moth of the family Erebidae first described by Alberto Zilli and Jeremy Daniel Holloway in 2005. It is found on the Peninsular Malaysia, Sumatra and Borneo.

The length of the forewings is 31.5-32.5 mm for both males and females.
