= Mirosternus =

Scientific classification
- Kingdom: Animalia
- Phylum: Arthropoda
- Clade: Pancrustacea
- Class: Insecta
- Order: Coleoptera
- Suborder: Polyphaga
- Family: Ptinidae
- Tribe: Mirosternini
- Genus: Mirosternus; Sharp, 1881

Genus of beetles

Mirosternus is a genus of beetles in the family Ptinidae. There are at least 70 described species in Mirosternus.

== Species ==
These 70 species belong to the genus Mirosternus:

- Mirosternus acutus Blackburn, 1885^{i c g}
- Mirosternus affinis Perkins, 1910^{i c g}
- Mirosternus amatus Perkins, 1910^{i c g}
- Mirosternus amaurodes Perkins, 1910^{i c g}
- Mirosternus angulatus Perkins, 1910^{i c g}
- Mirosternus basalis Perkins, 1910^{i c g}
- Mirosternus bicolor Sharp, 1881^{i c g}
- Mirosternus blackburni Perkins, 1910^{i c g}
- Mirosternus blackburnioides Perkins, 1910^{i c g}
- Mirosternus carinatus Sharp, 1881^{i c g}
- Mirosternus cognatus Perkins, 1910^{i c g}
- Mirosternus debilis Sharp, 1881^{i c g}
- Mirosternus denudatus Perkins, 1910^{i c g}
- Mirosternus dimidiatus Perkins, 1910^{i c g}
- Mirosternus discolor Perkins, 1910^{i c g}
- Mirosternus dubiosus Perkins, 1910^{i c g}
- Mirosternus duplex Perkins, 1910^{i c g}
- Mirosternus elongatulus Perkins, 1910^{i c g}
- Mirosternus epichrysus Perkins, 1910^{i c g}
- Mirosternus euceras Perkins, 1910^{i c g}
- Mirosternus eutheorus Perkins, 1910^{i c g}
- Mirosternus excelsior Perkins, 1910^{i c g}
- Mirosternus eximius Perkins, 1910^{i c g}
- Mirosternus fractus Perkins, 1910^{i c g}
- Mirosternus frigidus Perkins, 1910^{i c g}
- Mirosternus glabripennis Sharp, 1881^{i c g}
- Mirosternus hawaiiensis Perkins, 1910^{i c g}
- Mirosternus hirsutulus Perkins, 1910^{i c g}
- Mirosternus hypocoelus Perkins, 1910^{i c g}
- Mirosternus ignotus Perkins, 1910^{i c g}
- Mirosternus irregularis Perkins, 1910^{i c g}
- Mirosternus kauaiensis Perkins, 1910^{i c g}
- Mirosternus konanus Perkins, 1910^{i c g}
- Mirosternus laevis Perkins, 1910^{i c g}
- Mirosternus lanaiensis Perkins, 1910^{i c g}
- Mirosternus latifrons Perkins, 1910^{i c g}
- Mirosternus lugubris Perkins, 1910^{i c g}
- Mirosternus marginatus Perkins, 1910^{i c g}
- Mirosternus maurus Perkins, 1910^{i c g}
- Mirosternus molokaiensis Perkins, 1910^{i c g}
- Mirosternus montanus Perkins, 1910^{i c g}
- Mirosternus muticus Sharp, 1881^{i c g}
- Mirosternus nigrocastaneus Perkins, 1910^{i c g}
- Mirosternus obscurus Sharp, 1881^{i c g}
- Mirosternus oculatus Perkins, 1910^{i c g}
- Mirosternus pallidicornis Perkins, 1910^{i c g}
- Mirosternus parcus Perkins, 1910^{i c g}
- Mirosternus parvulus Perkins, 1910^{i c g}
- Mirosternus peles Perkins, 1910^{i c g}
- Mirosternus plebeius Perkins, 1910^{i c g}
- Mirosternus punctatissimus Perkins, 1910^{i c g}
- Mirosternus punctatus Sharp, 1881^{i c g}
- Mirosternus pusillus Perkins, 1910^{i c g}
- Mirosternus pyrophilus Perkins, 1910^{i c g}
- Mirosternus rufescens Perkins, 1910^{i c g}
- Mirosternus rugipennis Perkins, 1910^{i c g}
- Mirosternus sculptus Perkins, 1910^{i c g}
- Mirosternus simplex Perkins, 1910^{i c g}
- Mirosternus solidus Perkins, 1910^{i c g}
- Mirosternus solitarius Perkins, 1910^{i c g}
- Mirosternus sordidus Perkins, 1910^{i c g}
- Mirosternus stenarthrus Perkins, 1910^{i c g}
- Mirosternus subparcus Perkins, 1910^{i c g}
- Mirosternus testaceus Perkins, 1910^{i c g}
- Mirosternus tetragonus Perkins, 1910^{i c g}
- Mirosternus tristis Perkins, 1910^{i c g}
- Mirosternus varicolor Perkins, 1910^{i c g}
- Mirosternus varius Perkins, 1910^{i c g}
- Mirosternus vestitus Perkins, 1910^{i c g}
- Mirosternus xanthostictus Perkins, 1910^{i c g}

Data sources: i = ITIS, c = Catalogue of Life, g = GBIF, b = Bugguide.net
