= Penicillaria nugatrix =

Scientific classification
- Kingdom: Animalia
- Phylum: Arthropoda
- Class: Insecta
- Order: Lepidoptera
- Superfamily: Noctuoidea
- Family: Euteliidae
- Genus: Penicillaria
- Species: P. nugatrix

Binomial name
- Penicillaria nugatrix Guenée, 1852

Species of moth

Penicillaria nugatrix is a moth of the family Euteliidae first described by Achille Guenée in 1852. It is found in Sri Lanka and India.
