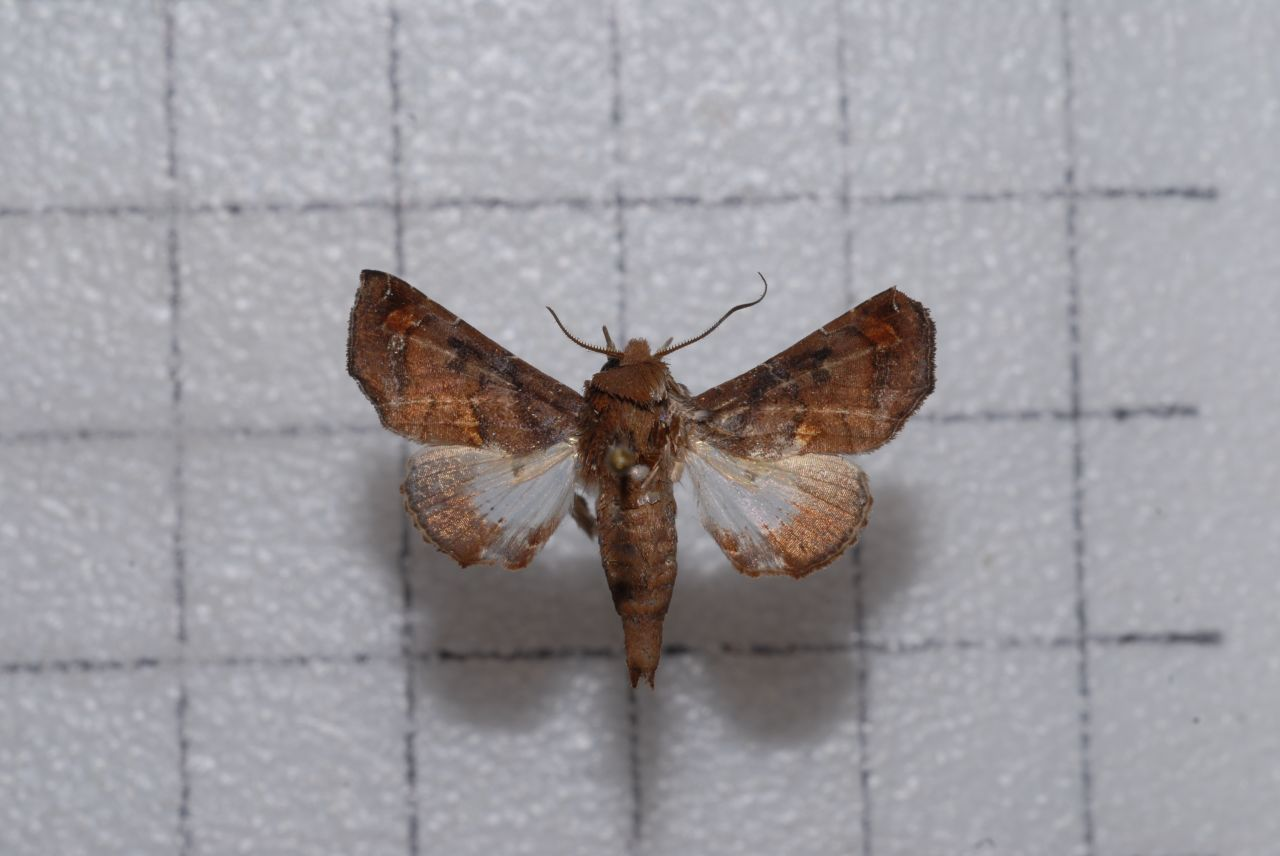

Scientific classification
- Kingdom: Animalia
- Phylum: Arthropoda
- Class: Insecta
- Order: Lepidoptera
- Superfamily: Noctuoidea
- Family: Euteliidae
- Genus: Penicillaria
- Species: P. simplex

Binomial name
- Penicillaria simplex (Walker, 1865)

Synonyms
- Eutelia simplex Walker, 1865; Bombotelia simplex; Bombotelia connectens Mell, 1943

= Penicillaria simplex =

Species of moth

Penicillaria simplex is a moth of the family Euteliidae first described by Francis Walker in 1865. It is found from the Oriental tropics east to New Guinea.
