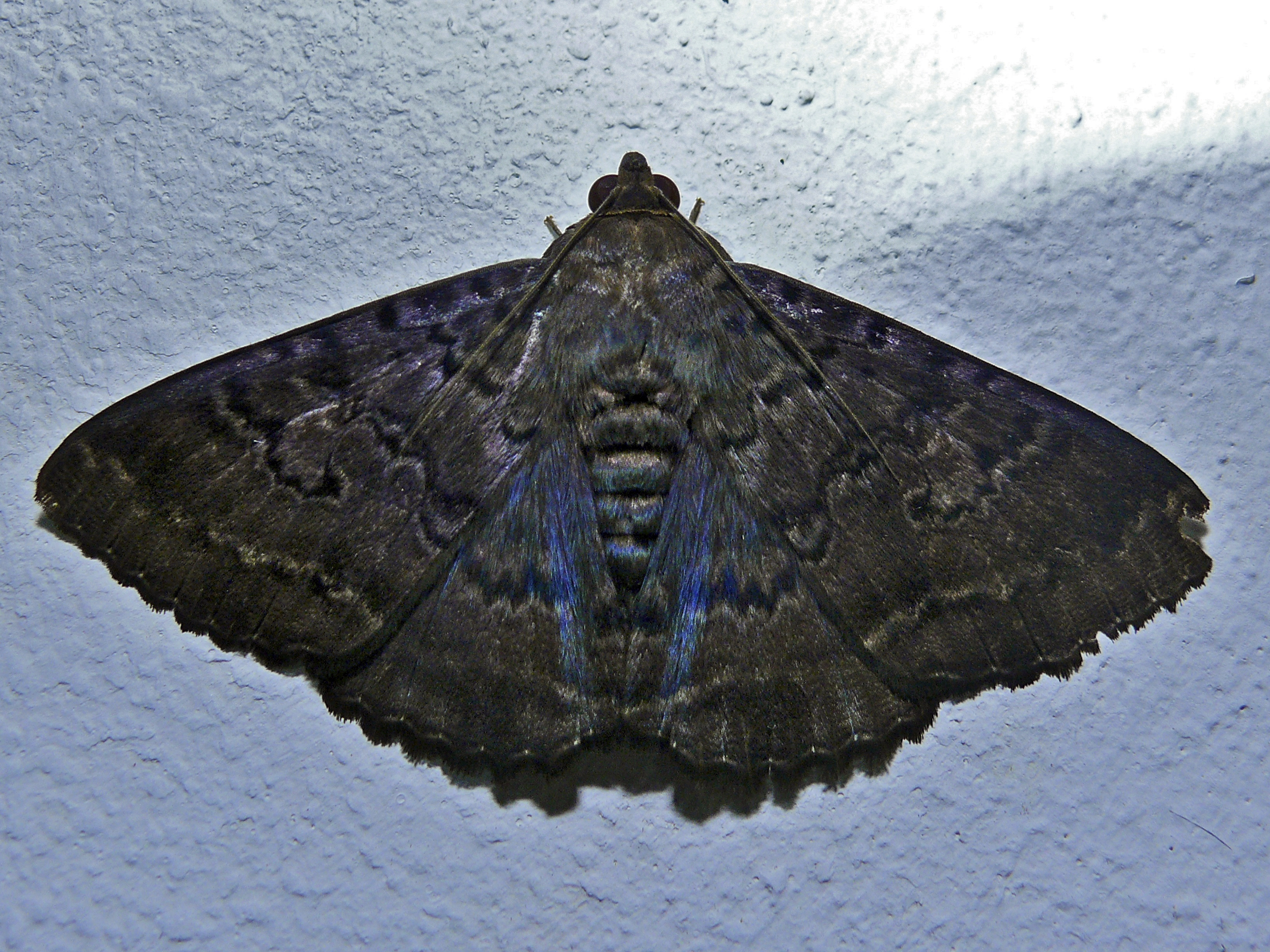

Scientific classification
- Kingdom: Animalia
- Phylum: Arthropoda
- Clade: Pancrustacea
- Class: Insecta
- Order: Lepidoptera
- Superfamily: Noctuoidea
- Family: Erebidae
- Genus: Speiredonia
- Species: S. mutabilis

Binomial name
- Speiredonia mutabilis (Fabricius, 1794)

Synonyms
- Noctua mutabilis Fabricius, 1794; Sericia anops Guenée, 1852

= Speiredonia mutabilis =

Species of moth

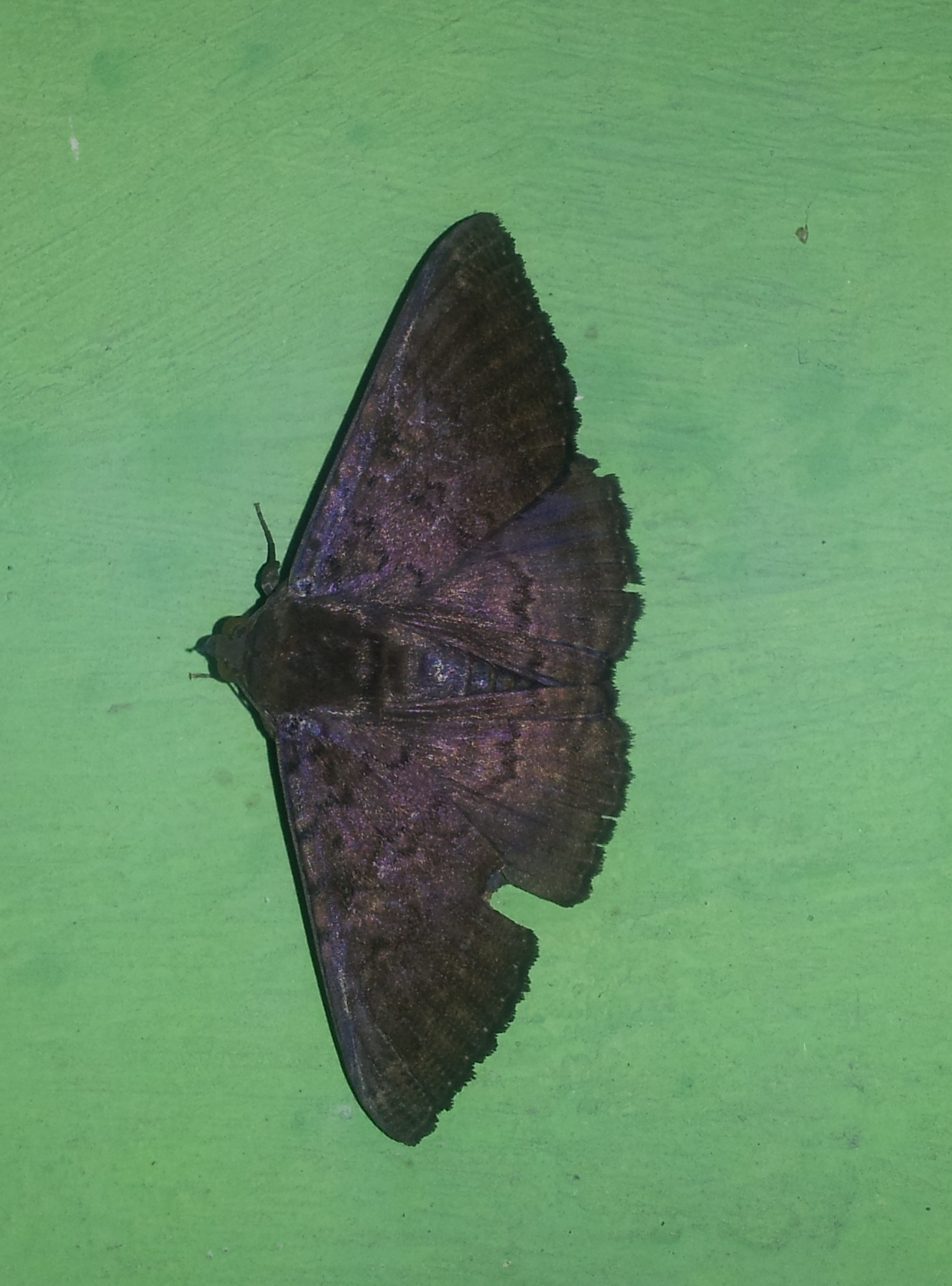
From Sri Lanka

Speiredonia mutabilis is a species of moth of the family Erebidae first described by Johan Christian Fabricius in 1794. It is found in India, Sri Lanka, Vietnam, Taiwan, the Philippines, from Sundaland eastwards to Australia, the Solomon Islands, New Caledonia, Vanuatu, Fiji and Tonga.

== Description ==
Its wingspan is about 70–78 mm. Adult blackish brown with purplish tinged. Forewings with waved sub-basal, antemedial, and medial black lines. There is a spot in cell and a double post-medial waved line excurved from vein 2 to lower angle o cell. An indistinct sinuous sub-marginal double line also present. Hindwings with medial lunulate line and traces of a sinuous double sub-marginal line.

The larvae feed on Acacia species.
