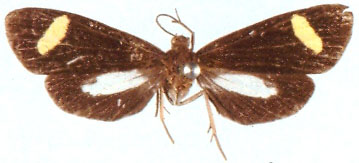

Scientific classification
- Kingdom: Animalia
- Phylum: Arthropoda
- Clade: Pancrustacea
- Class: Insecta
- Order: Lepidoptera
- Superfamily: Noctuoidea
- Family: Notodontidae
- Genus: Proutiella
- Species: P. simplex

Binomial name
- Proutiella simplex (Walker, 1856)

Synonyms
- Ephialtias simplex Walker, 1856

= Proutiella simplex =

Species of moth

Proutiella simplex is a moth of the family Notodontidae. It is only known from the lower Amazon in Brazil.

The length of the forewings is 14–15 mm.
