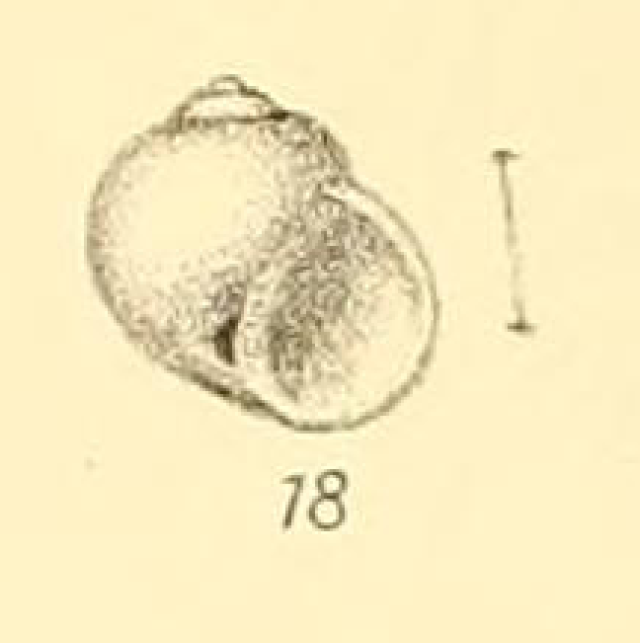

Scientific classification
- Kingdom: Animalia
- Phylum: Mollusca
- Class: Gastropoda
- Subclass: Caenogastropoda
- Order: Littorinimorpha
- Family: Naticidae
- Genus: Natica
- Species: N. simplex

Binomial name
- Natica simplex G. B. Sowerby III, 1897

Synonyms
- Natica decipiens E. A. Smith, 1904; Natica kowiensis Turton, 1932; Natica saldontiana Bartsch, 1915; Natica simplex f. saldontiana Bartsch, 1915; Natica whitechurchi Turton, 1932

= Natica simplex =

Species of gastropod

Natica simplex is a species of predatory sea snail, a marine gastropod mollusk in the family Naticidae, the moon snails.
