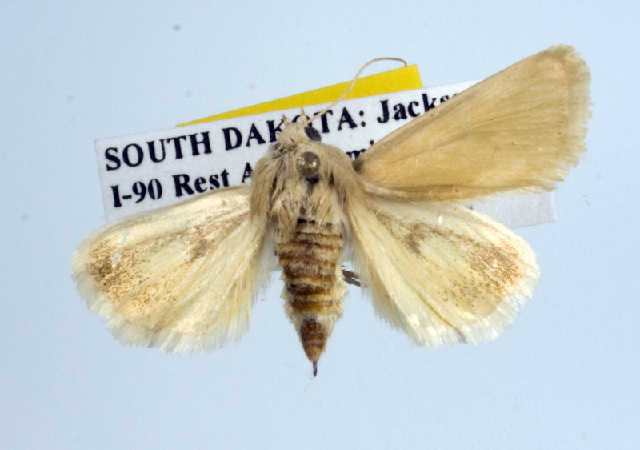

Scientific classification
- Domain: Eukaryota
- Kingdom: Animalia
- Phylum: Arthropoda
- Class: Insecta
- Order: Lepidoptera
- Superfamily: Noctuoidea
- Family: Noctuidae
- Genus: Schinia
- Species: S. simplex

Binomial name
- Schinia simplex Smith, 1891

= Schinia simplex =

Species of moth

Schinia simplex is a moth of the family Noctuidae. It is found in the western Great Plains from North Dakota to New Mexico.

The wingspan is about 30 mm.

Larvae have been recorded on Ipomoea leptophylla.
