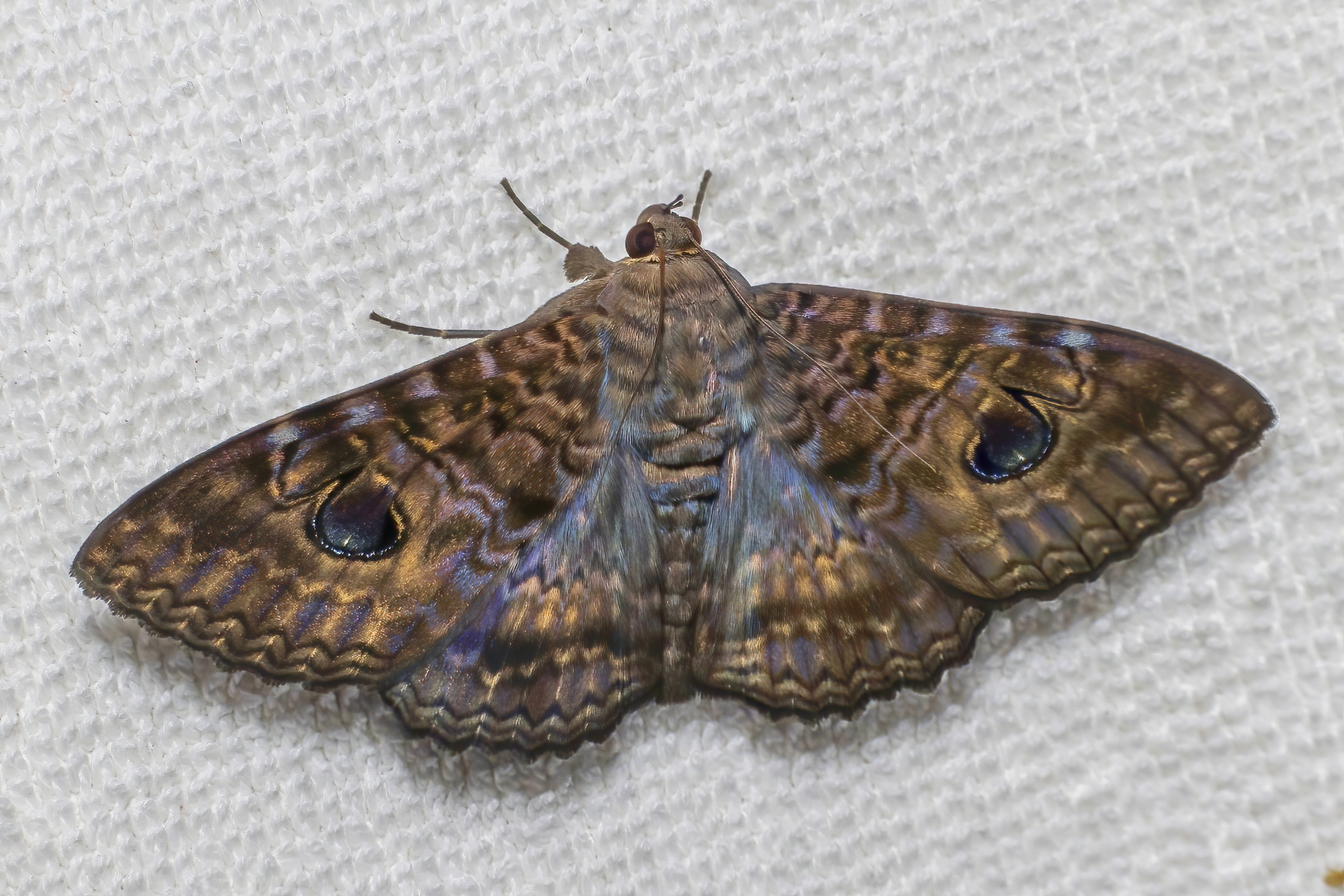
- male, from Sri Lanka

Scientific classification
- Domain: Eukaryota
- Kingdom: Animalia
- Phylum: Arthropoda
- Class: Insecta
- Order: Lepidoptera
- Superfamily: Noctuoidea
- Family: Erebidae
- Genus: Speiredonia
- Species: S. obscura

Binomial name
- Speiredonia obscura (Cramer, 1780)

Synonyms
- Phalaena Noctua obscura Cramer, 1780; Phalaena Noctua zamis Stoll, 1790; Sericia diops Walker, 1858; Speiredonia retrahens Walker, 1858; Ommatophora albifascia Walker, 1865; Spiredonia conspicua R. Felder, 1874; Sericia sumbana Swinhoe, 1918; Sericia layardi Hampson, 1926; Spirama obscura; Speiredonia zamis (Stoll, 1790)

= Speiredonia obscura =

Species of moth

Speiredonia obscura is a species of moth of the family Erebidae first described by Pieter Cramer in 1780.

== Distribution ==
It is found in India, Sri Lanka, Myanmar, Taiwan, the Andamans, Thailand, Cambodia, Vietnam, the Philippines, Palawan, from Sundaland eastwards to Australia, the Bismarck Archipelago, Solomon Islands, Loyalty Islands, New Caledonia, Marianas, western Carolines.

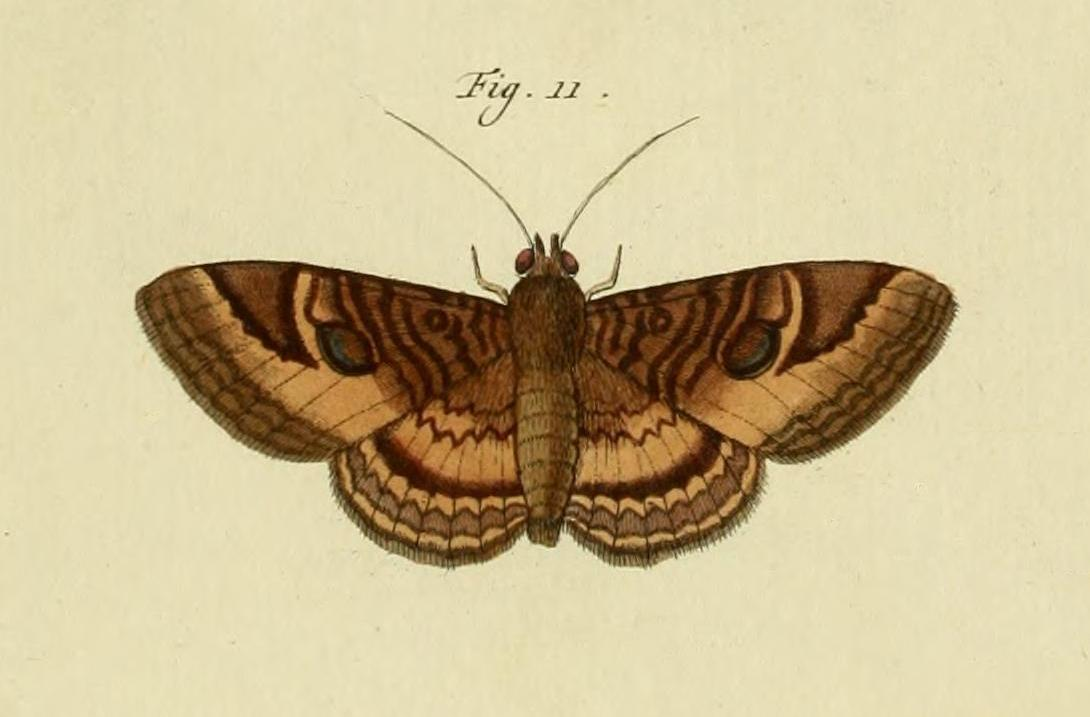
Illustration from Pieter Cramer and Caspar Stoll's De uitlandsche kapellen

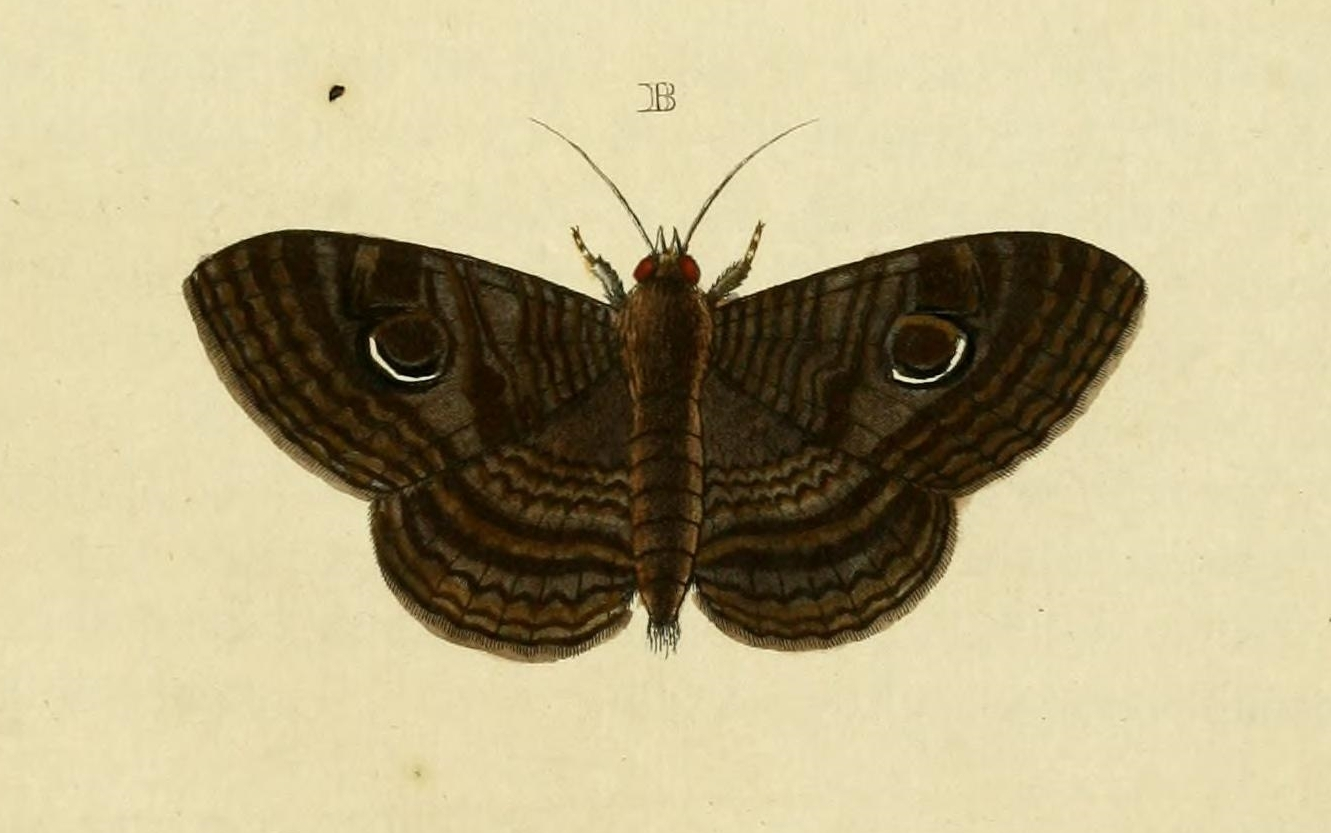
Illustration from the same work
