= Speiredonia darwiniana =

Scientific classification
- Domain: Eukaryota
- Kingdom: Animalia
- Phylum: Arthropoda
- Class: Insecta
- Order: Lepidoptera
- Superfamily: Noctuoidea
- Family: Erebidae
- Genus: Speiredonia
- Species: S. darwiniana

Binomial name
- Speiredonia darwiniana Zilli, 2010

Species of moth

Speiredonia darwiniana is a species of moth of the family Erebidae first described by Alberto Zilli in 2010. It is found in north-western Australia, where it has been recorded from Western Australia and the Northern Territory.

The wingspan is 68–73 mm.
