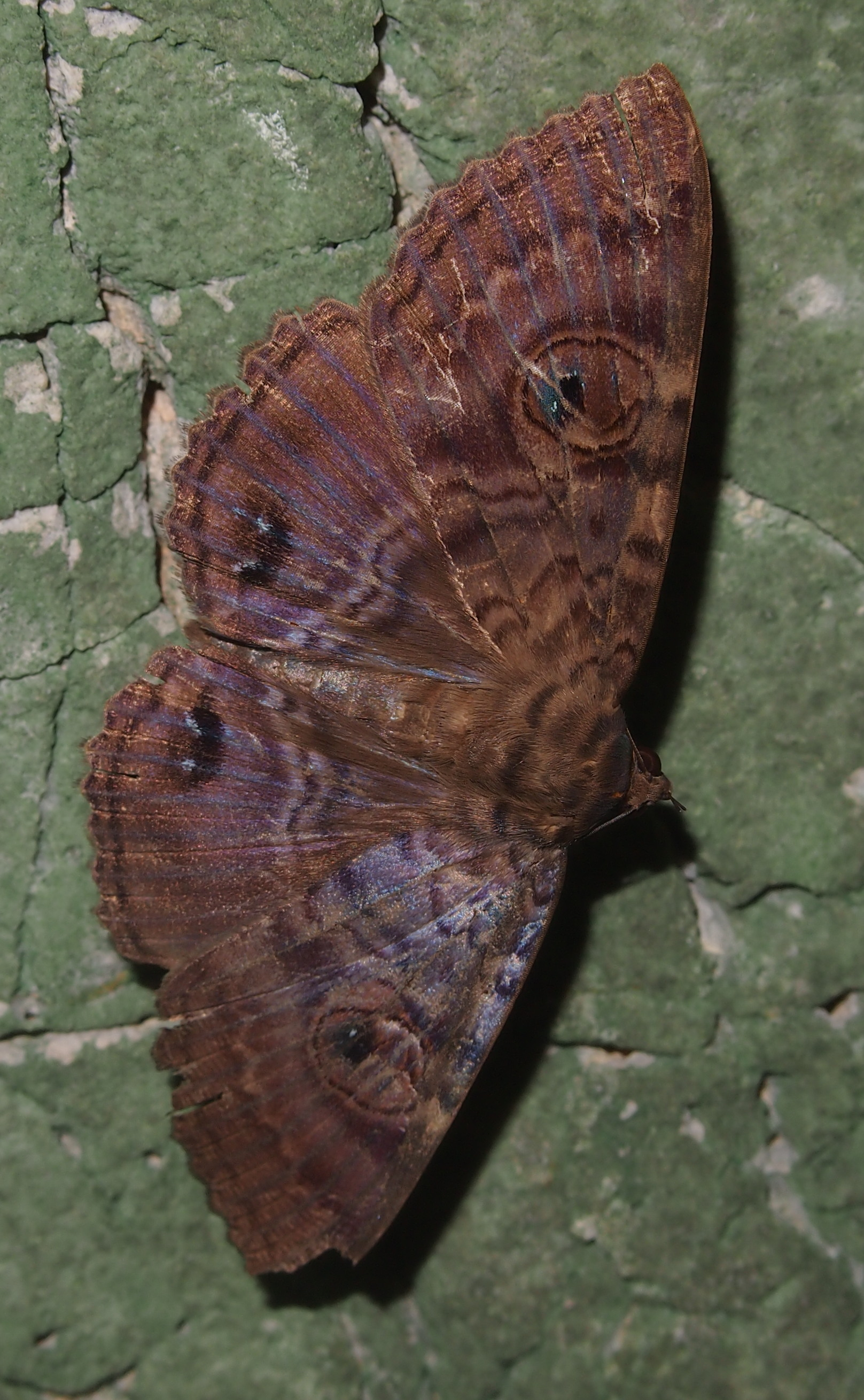

Scientific classification
- Kingdom: Animalia
- Phylum: Arthropoda
- Class: Insecta
- Order: Lepidoptera
- Superfamily: Noctuoidea
- Family: Erebidae
- Genus: Speiredonia
- Species: S. spectans

Binomial name
- Speiredonia spectans (Guenée, 1852)

Synonyms
- Sericia spectans Guenée, 1852

= Speiredonia spectans =

Species of moth

Speiredonia spectans, the granny's cloak moth, is a moth of the family Erebidae. The species was first described by Achille Guenée in 1852. It is found in north-eastern Australia and Tasmania. Strays have been recorded on Norfolk Island and in New Zealand.

The wingspan is about 70 mm.

The larvae feed on Acacia species.

== Gallery ==
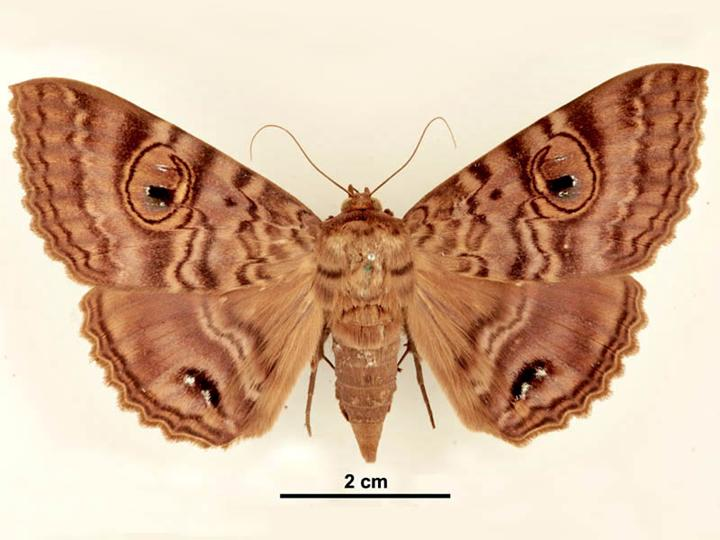
Female, dorsal view

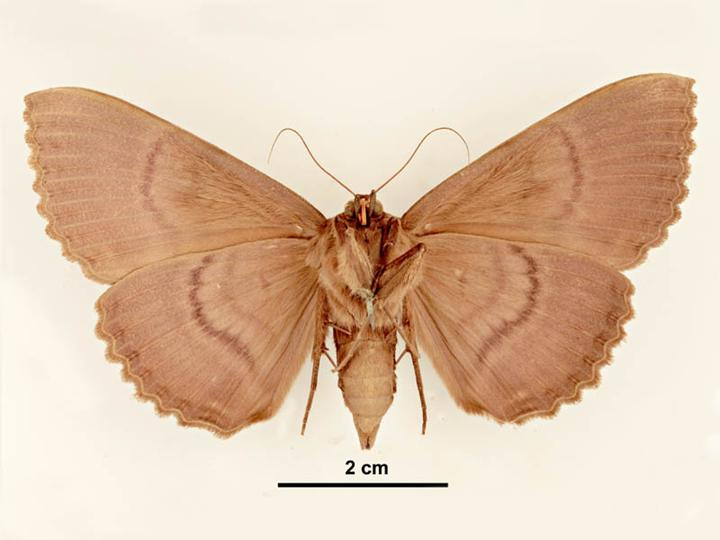
Female, ventral view

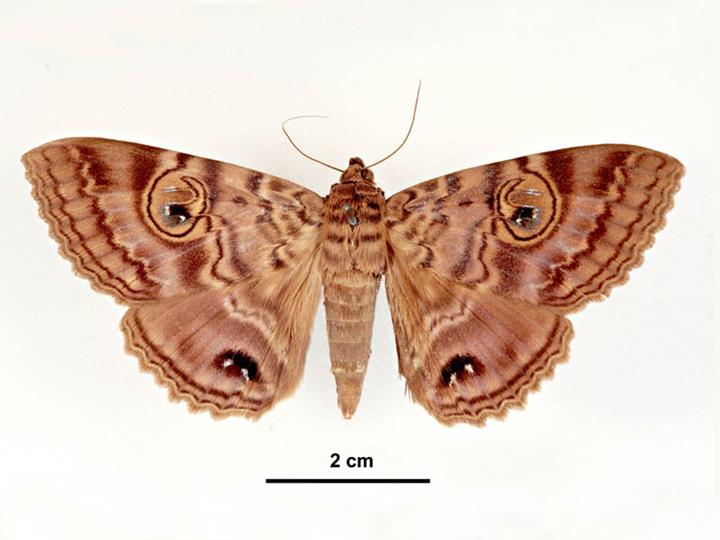
Male, dorsal view

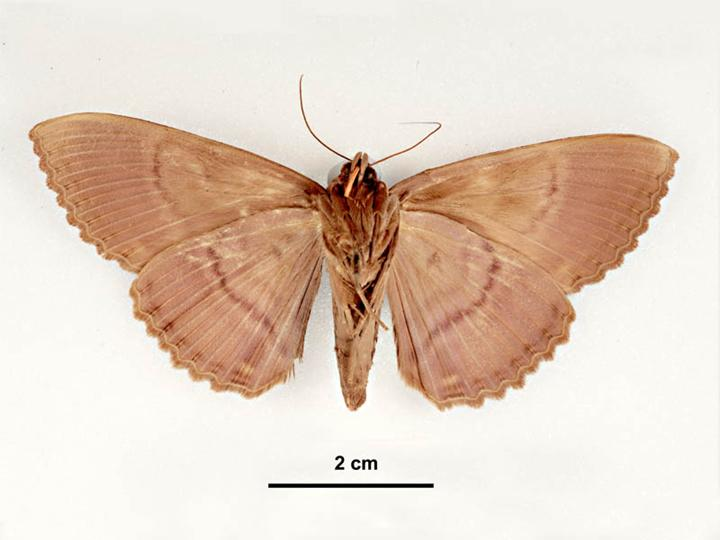
Male, ventral view
