= Vriesea simplex =

Scientific classification
- Kingdom: Plantae
- Clade: Tracheophytes
- Clade: Angiosperms
- Clade: Monocots
- Clade: Commelinids
- Order: Poales
- Family: Bromeliaceae
- Genus: Vriesea
- Species: V. simplex

Binomial name
- Vriesea simplex (Vellozo) Beer

Synonyms
- Tillandsia simplex Vell.

Species of epiphyte

Vriesea simplex is a plant species in the genus Vriesea. This species is native to Trinidad, Colombia, eastern Brazil and Venezuela.

== Cultivars ==
- Vriesea 'Charles W.'
- Vriesea 'Golden Tips'
- Vriesea 'Karamea Tipsy'
- Vriesea 'Maroon Delight'
- Vriesea 'Redtail'
- Vriesea 'Sidewinder'
