= Speiredonia simplex =

Scientific classification
- Domain: Eukaryota
- Kingdom: Animalia
- Phylum: Arthropoda
- Class: Insecta
- Order: Lepidoptera
- Superfamily: Noctuoidea
- Family: Erebidae
- Genus: Speiredonia
- Species: S. simplex

Binomial name
- Speiredonia simplex Butler, 1877

Synonyms
- Sericia obalauae Bethune-Baker, 1915

Species of moth

Speiredonia simplex is a species of moth of the family Erebidae first described by Arthur Gardiner Butler in 1877. It is found on the Loyalty Islands, Vanuatu, Fiji and Tonga.
