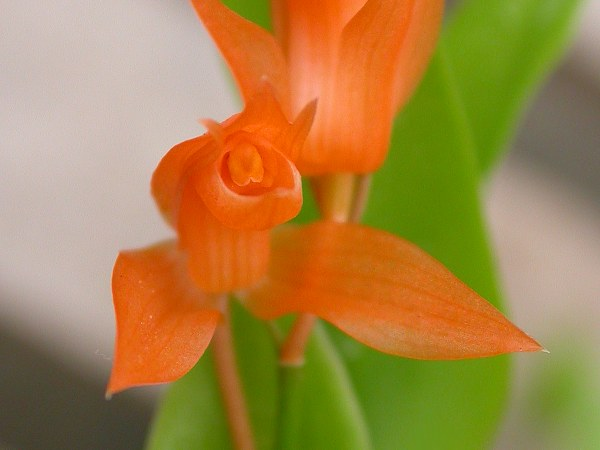

Scientific classification
- Kingdom: Plantae
- Clade: Embryophytes
- Clade: Tracheophytes
- Clade: Spermatophytes
- Clade: Angiosperms
- Clade: Monocots
- Order: Asparagales
- Family: Orchidaceae
- Subfamily: Epidendroideae
- Tribe: Arethuseae
- Genus: Coelogyne
- Species: C. miniata

Binomial name
- Coelogyne miniata (Blume) Lindl. (1833)

Synonyms
- Chelonanthera miniata Blume (1825) (Basionym); Coelogyne simplex Lindl. (1854); Pleione miniata (Blume) Kuntze (1891); Pleione simplex (Lindl.) Kuntze (1891); Coelogyne lauterbachiana Kraenzl. (1895); Pleione lauterbachiana (Kraenzl.) Kuntze (1903); Hologyne miniata (Blume) Pfitzer (1907); Hologyne lauterbachiana (Kraenzl.) Pfitzer (1907)

= Coelogyne miniata =

Species of orchid

Coelogyne miniata is a species of epiphytic or lithophytic orchid in the genus Coelogyne, native to the western Malesian islands of Sumatra, Java, Bali and the Lesser Sunda Islands. It is a small, straggling, creeping plant, distinguished within its mostly white- or cream-flowered genus by unusually vivid orange-red flowers, and it is the type species of Coelogyne section Hologyne.

== Taxonomy ==
The species was first described in 1825 by the German-Dutch botanist Carl Ludwig Blume as Chelonanthera miniata, in his Bijdragen tot de Flora van Nederlandsch Indië (p. 385), based on material collected in Java during his botanical surveys for the Dutch colonial government. In 1833, John Lindley transferred it to the genus Coelogyne in his Genera and Species of Orchidaceous Plants (p. 42), giving rise to the currently accepted name Coelogyne miniata (Blume) Lindl.

The species has accumulated several synonyms over subsequent decades of taxonomic revision, including Coelogyne simplex Lindl. (1854), Coelogyne lauterbachiana Kraenzl. (1895), Hologyne miniata (Blume) Pfitzer (1907), Hologyne lauterbachiana (Kraenzl.) Pfitzer (1907), and combinations placed in Pleione by Otto Kuntze. The genus name Hologyne, proposed by Ernst Pfitzer in 1907, was later reduced to a section of Coelogyne; in Dorothy Clayton's 2002 monographic revision of the genus, The Genus Coelogyne: A Synopsis, C. miniata was designated the type species for section Hologyne, a small group that also includes C. malipoensis and C. obtusifolia.

The broader generic classification of Coelogyne has itself been unsettled. Traditional treatments, following the sectional system built up by Pfitzer and Kraenzlin, De Vogel (1994) and Clayton (2002), recognised more than twenty sections within a genus of a little over 200 species, but molecular phylogenetic work by Gravendeel and colleagues found Coelogyne to be polyphyletic, with the genera Neogyna and Pholidota nested within it. A subsequent, much larger expansion of the genus proposed by Chase, Gravendeel and colleagues in 2021 merged fourteen further segregate genera (including Dendrochilum, Pholidota and Bulleyia) into Coelogyne on the same molecular grounds; C. miniata, belonging to the core clade of the genus, is unaffected by this expansion and retains its name and sectional placement.

== Description ==
Coelogyne miniata is a small, cool- to warm-growing sympodial epiphyte, or occasionally a lithophyte on exposed rock faces, with a long, wiry, creeping rhizome. The cylindrical to ovoid pseudobulbs are widely spaced along the rhizome, typically 1–2.5 cm apart, and are enclosed when young by a few basal sheaths. This spaced, wandering growth habit gives mature plants a straggling or "rambling" appearance quite unlike the compact clumps formed by many other Coelogyne species, a trait repeatedly noted by growers as a distinguishing, if horticulturally inconvenient, feature of the species.

Each pseudobulb bears a pair of apical, elliptic, plicate (pleated), seven-nerved leaves that narrow abruptly at the base into a grooved petiole. Andy's Orchids, a specialist nursery, describes the leaves as bright green and around 10 cm long.

The inflorescence is produced synanthously or proteranthously (that is, with or just before the new leaf growth) from near the base of the young shoot. It is short, stiff, zig-zagged (fractiflex), around 7.5–10 cm long, and bears up to four flowers that open more or less simultaneously; the floral bracts, unusually for the genus, fall away as the flowers open rather than persisting. The flowers themselves are small, around 2.5 cm across, but conspicuous for their colour: an intense, glossy orange-red unlike the whites, creams and browns typical of most Coelogyne flowers. The Latin epithet miniata, meaning "coloured with red lead" or vermilion, refers directly to this flower colour and is shared with a number of unrelated plants named for the same striking hue, including Clivia miniata and Eucalyptus miniata. Growers also note that the flowers tend to remain rather closed or cup-shaped rather than opening flat, and that the inflorescences carry only a small number of blooms at a time compared with the larger, showier displays of many related species.

== Distribution and habitat ==
Coelogyne miniata is endemic to the western part of the Malay Archipelago, with a native range spanning Sumatra, Java, Bali and the Lesser Sunda Islands of Indonesia. It grows as an epiphyte on trees, or as a lithophyte on large rocks, in lower and upper montane forest, generally at elevations of about 1,000 to 2,400 metres, though some sources report plants at up to 2,500 metres. At these elevations it experiences a consistently cool, wet, tropical montane climate, and Kew's Plants of the World Online places it within the wet tropical biome.

== Cultivation ==
In cultivation, Coelogyne miniata is generally regarded as an easy-to-grow but horticulturally unremarkable species, valued chiefly by species collectors for its unusual flower colour rather than for showiness or fragrance. Its montane origin means it tolerates a range of temperatures from cool to warm-intermediate, but it requires consistently high humidity and frequent watering throughout the year, reflecting the constant moisture of its native cloud-forest habitat; growers are typically advised to water several times a week and to avoid the plant drying out. Because of its creeping, widely spaced growth habit, it is usually grown mounted on bark or in a hanging basket rather than in a standard pot, so that the rhizome has room to ramble. Flowering is not strongly seasonal in cultivation, with sources reporting blooms produced from new growths at various points through the year, including winter and spring.

== Conservation status ==
Coelogyne miniata has not been formally assessed on the IUCN Red List. It is described in horticultural and taxonomic sources as occurring across a fairly wide range of montane forest on several Indonesian islands, but no population data or dedicated conservation assessment appears to have been published.
