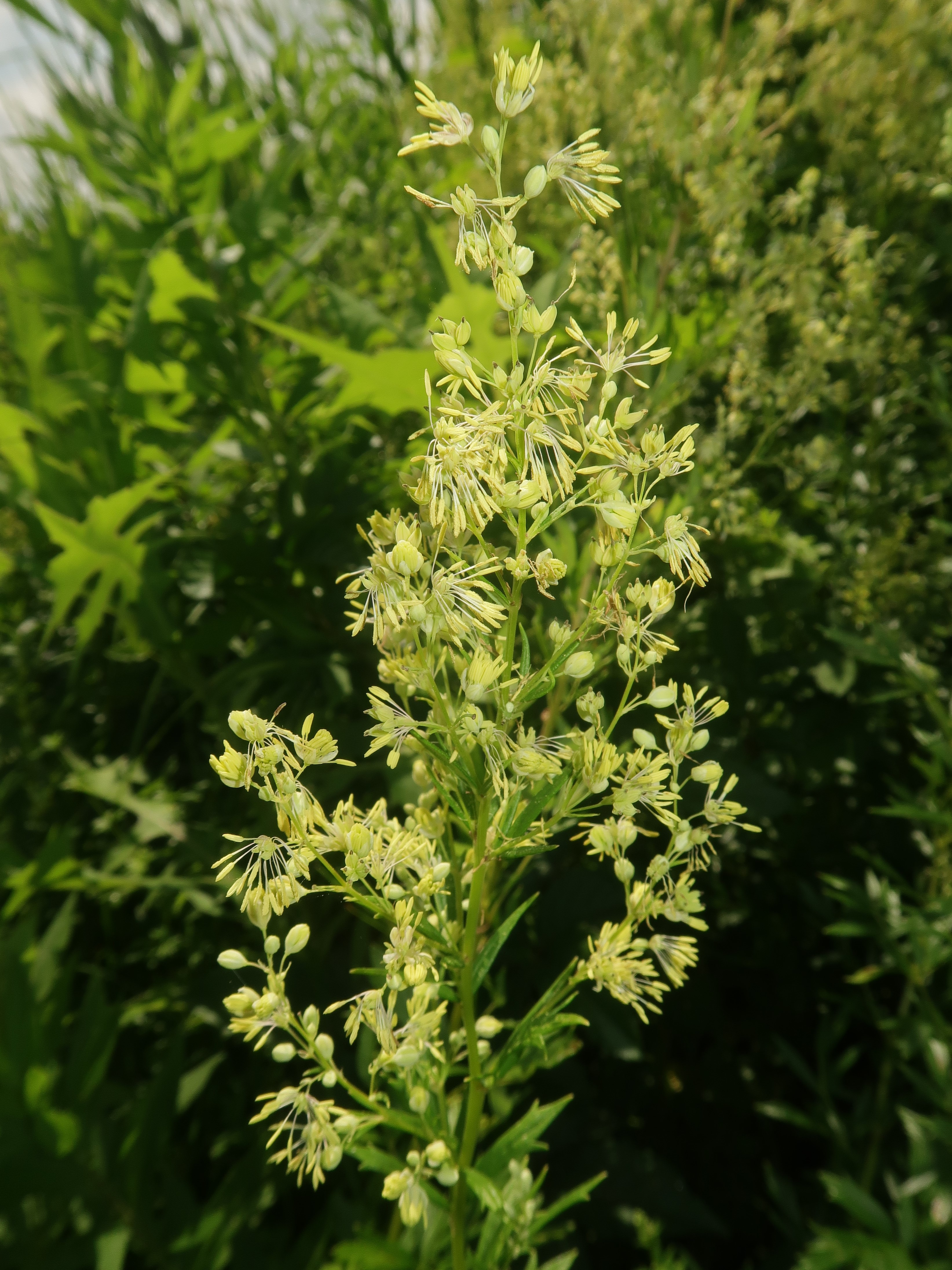

Scientific classification
- Kingdom: Plantae
- Clade: Tracheophytes
- Clade: Angiosperms
- Clade: Eudicots
- Order: Ranunculales
- Family: Ranunculaceae
- Genus: Thalictrum
- Species: T. simplex

Binomial name
- Thalictrum simplex L.

= Thalictrum simplex =

Species of flowering plant

Thalictrum simplex is a species of flowering plant belonging to the family Ranunculaceae.

Its native range is Temperate Eurasia.
