= Declinata =

Declinata may refer to:

- Acacia declinata, species of shrub
- Metachanda declinata, species of moth
- Paectes declinata, species of tree
- Saraca declinata, species of tree
- Scopula declinata, species of moth
- Vriesea declinata, species of plant
- Yucca declinata, species of plant
