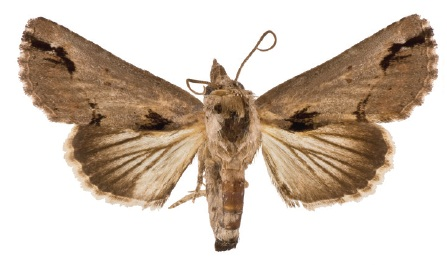
- Female
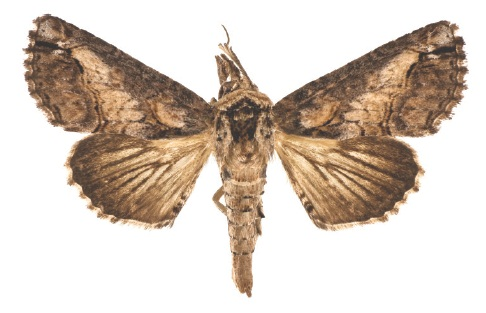
- Male

Scientific classification
- Kingdom: Animalia
- Phylum: Arthropoda
- Class: Insecta
- Order: Lepidoptera
- Superfamily: Noctuoidea
- Family: Euteliidae
- Genus: Paectes
- Species: P. nana

Binomial name
- Paectes nana (Walker, 1865)

Synonyms
- Edema nana Walker, 1865; Ingura burserae Dyar, 1901; Paectes burserae; Paectes indefatigabilis Schaus, 1923; Paectes isabel Schaus, 1923

= Paectes nana =

Species of moth

Paectes nana is a moth in the family Euteliidae. It is widespread from Florida through the Greater Antilles (except for Puerto Rico) and from Mexico to Costa Rica. In South America, it is found in Venezuela, Colombia and northern Ecuador. It has been introduced to the Galapagos Islands.

The forewing length is 10.9–11.6 mm for males and 9.4–9.9 mm for females. Adults are sexually dimorphic. There are two distinct forms. The most easily recognized bears exaggerated dark markings on the apical portion of the postmedial line that is contiguous with the subapical dash. The other form most resembles both Paectes asper, but in Paectes nana, the forewing costa is gray with small, faint, dark-gray quadrate spots along the margin. Adults are probably on wing year round with recorded dates from January to March, June to July, September to October and December.

The larvae have been reared from Schinus terebinthifolius. Other records include Bursera simaruba and Bursera tomentosa.

Thinking he was describing a new species, this moth was redescribed in 1923 by William Schaus and named Paectes isabel in honour the artist Isabel Cooper (artist).
