= Pallinup =

Pallinup may refer to:

- Pallinup, Western Australia, a locality in the Shire of Gnowangerup
- Pallinup River, a river in Western Australia
- Pallinup Nature Reserve, a nature reserve in Western Australia, located along the above river
- Beaufort Inlet (Western Australia), an inlet fed by the above river, also referred to as Pallinup Estuary
- Acacia declinata, also referred to as Pallinup gold
