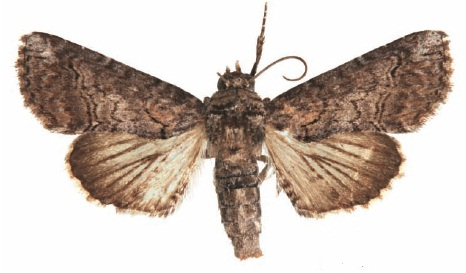
- Male
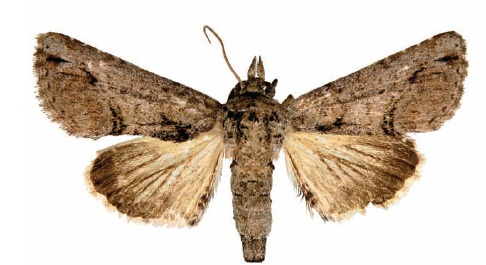
- Female

Scientific classification
- Domain: Eukaryota
- Kingdom: Animalia
- Phylum: Arthropoda
- Class: Insecta
- Order: Lepidoptera
- Superfamily: Noctuoidea
- Family: Euteliidae
- Genus: Paectes
- Species: P. sinuosa

Binomial name
- Paectes sinuosa Pogue, 2013

= Paectes sinuosa =

Species of moth

Paectes sinuosa is a moth in the family Euteliidae first described by Michael G. Pogue in 2013. It is found in the Brazilian states of Goiás and São Paulo, north-western Paraguay and the Argentine province of Tucumán.

The forewing length is 10.5 mm for males and 9.5 mm for females. The costal area of the forewings is dark gray with a few white scales forming short dashes along the costa, especially from the postmedial band to just below the apex. There is a distinct ovate cream-colored basal spot. The hindwings are white with a dark gray marginal shading. The veins are highlighted in dark gray and the anal fold has a white and dark gray striped pattern.

The larvae have been reared from Schinus terebinthifolius and Lithraea molleoides.

== Etymology ==
The specific name is derived from the Latin sinuo (meaning bend) and refers to the sinuate free saccular extension of the male genitalia.
