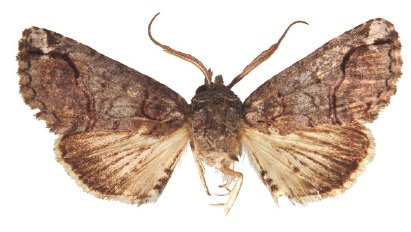
- Male

Scientific classification
- Domain: Eukaryota
- Kingdom: Animalia
- Phylum: Arthropoda
- Class: Insecta
- Order: Lepidoptera
- Superfamily: Noctuoidea
- Family: Euteliidae
- Genus: Paectes
- Species: P. similis

Binomial name
- Paectes similis Pogue, 2013

= Paectes similis =

Species of moth

Paectes similis is a moth in the family Euteliidae first described by Michael G. Pogue in 2013. It is found in the north-eastern Brazilian state of Pernambuco.

The length of the forewings is 10.5 mm for males. The forewing costal area has pale-gray scales tipped with white. There are minute white dots from the postmedial line to the apex and a prominent white apical spot. The basal area is ferruginous mixed with a few pale-gray and white scales. The antemedial line is black and incomplete. The medial area is slightly paler in overall color from the terminal area. The hindwings are white, the marginal shading and veins are highlighted dark gray and the anal fold is diffuse white with a dark-gray striped pattern.

== Etymology ==
The specific name is the Latin term for "like" which refers to the similarity between this species and Paectes longiformis.
