= Bharatiana =

Scientific classification
- Kingdom: Animalia
- Phylum: Arthropoda
- Class: Insecta
- Order: Hemiptera
- Suborder: Sternorrhyncha
- Superfamily: Psylloidea
- Family: Mastigimatidae
- Genus: Bharatiana; Mathur, 1973

Genus of true bugs

Bharatiana is a genus of Asian plant lice in the recently (2021) restored family Mastigimatidae; previously it was included in the Calophyidae and this placement currently (February 2025) remains in many databases. The genus and type species were described by R.N. Mathur in 1973, after Bharat, an ancient name for India; other species have been recorded subsequently from China.

== Species ==
The Global Biodiversity Information Facility includes:

1. Bharatiana octospinosa Mathur, 1973 - type species
2. Bharatiana septentrionalis Yang & Li, 1983
3. Bharatiana toonae Yang & Li, 1983
4. Bharatiana toonaqiana Yang & Li, 1983
