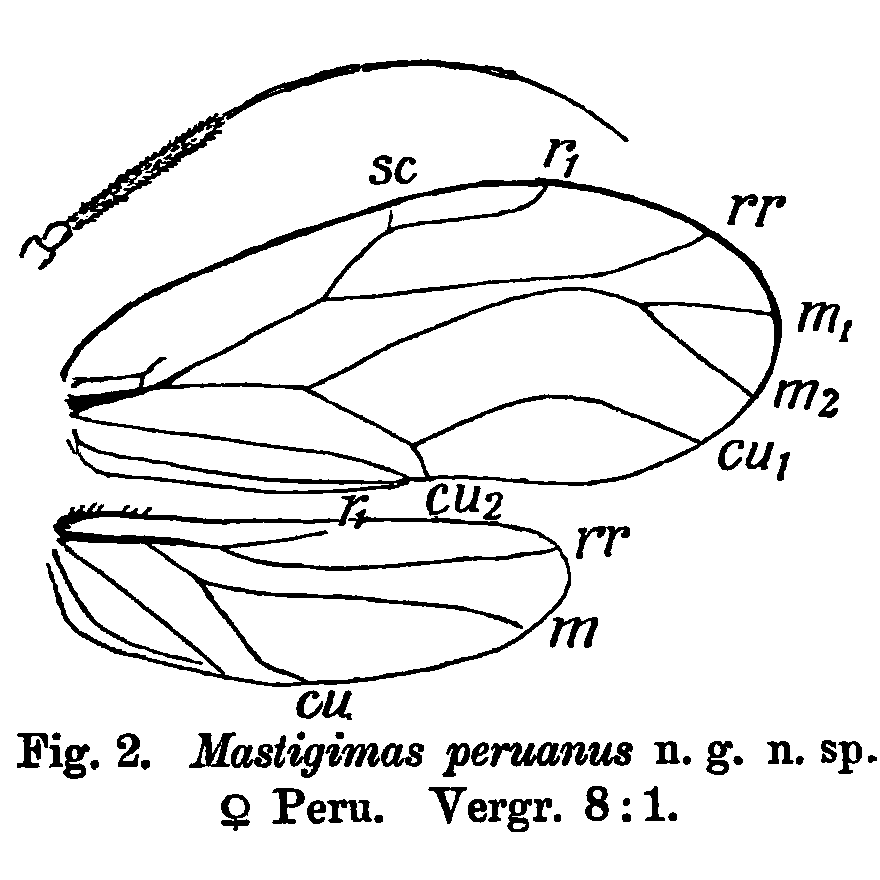
- Characteristic features of Mastigimas peruanus

Scientific classification
- Kingdom: Animalia
- Phylum: Arthropoda
- Clade: Pancrustacea
- Class: Insecta
- Order: Hemiptera
- Suborder: Sternorrhyncha
- Superfamily: Psylloidea
- Family: Mastigimatidae
- Genus: Mastigimas; Enderlein, 1921

Synonyms
- Coelocara Tuthill, 1945

= Mastigimas =

Genus of true bugs

Mastigimas is the type genus of plant lice in the recently (2021) restored family Mastigimatidae; previously it was included in the Calophyidae and this placement currently (February 2025) remains in many databases. The genus was erected by Günther Enderlein in 1921 and species have been recorded from central and southern America.

== Species ==
The Global Biodiversity Information Facility lists:

1. Mastigimas anjosi Burckhardt, Queiroz, Queiroz, Andrade, Zanol & Reze
2. Mastigimas cedrelae (Schwarz, 1899)
3. Mastigimas colombianus Burckhardt, Queiroz & Drohojowska, 2013
4. Mastigimas drepanodis Burckhardt, Queiroz & Drohojowska, 2013
5. Mastigimas ernstii (Schwarz, 1899)
6. Mastigimas peruanus Enderlein, 1921
7. Mastigimas reseri Burckhardt, Queiroz & Drohojowska, 2013
8. Mastigimas schwarzi (Tuthill, 1945)
