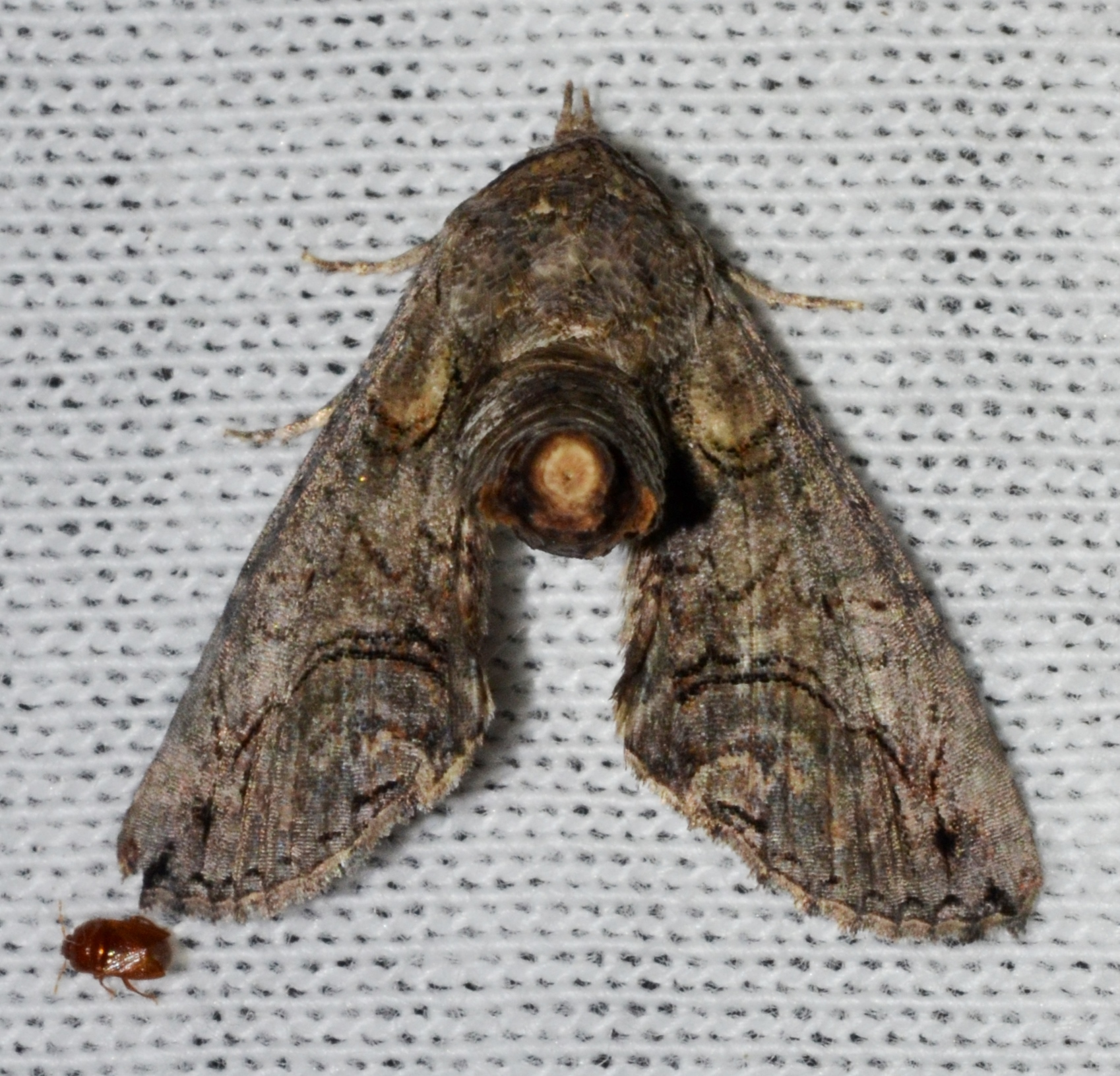

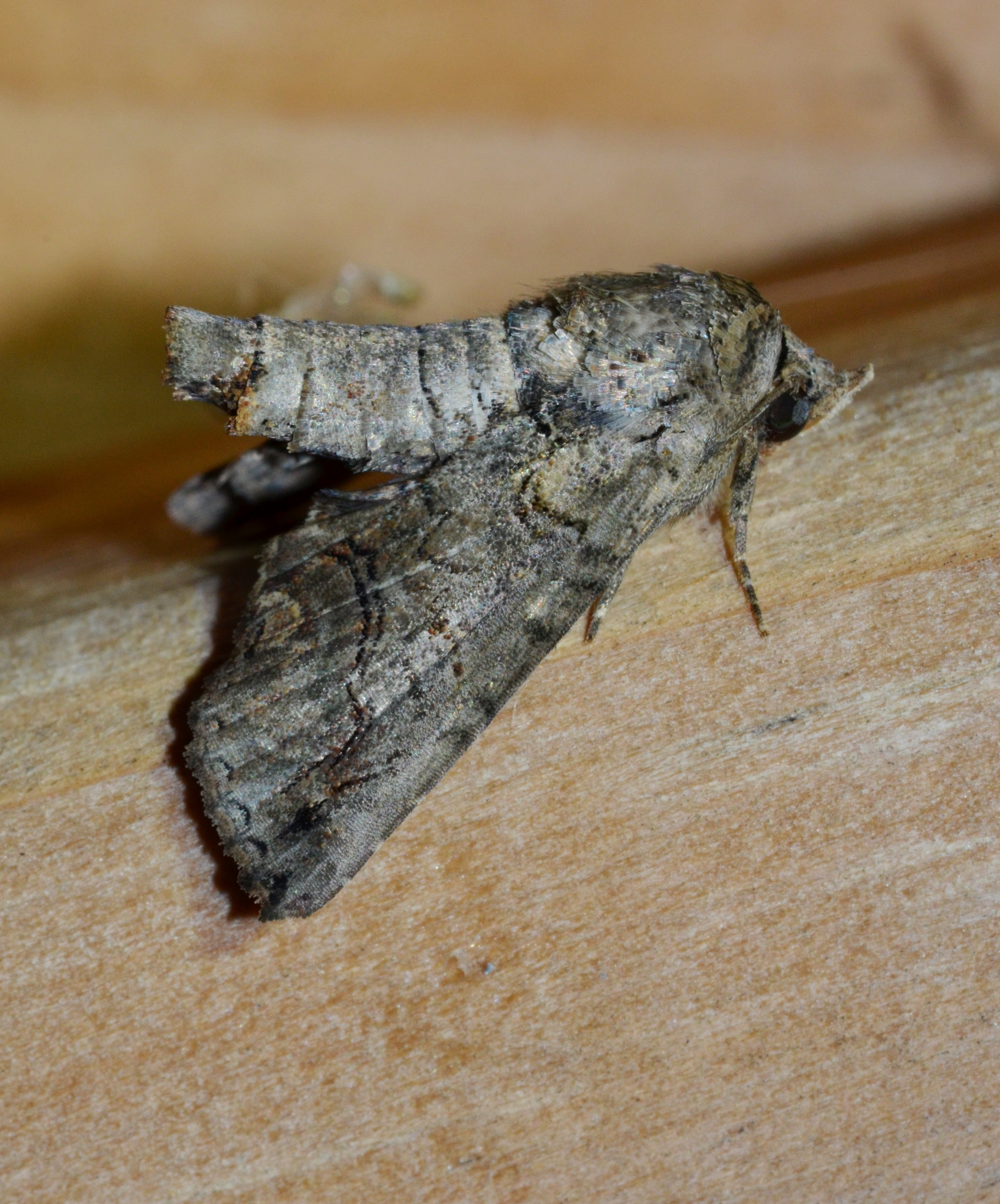

Scientific classification
- Kingdom: Animalia
- Phylum: Arthropoda
- Class: Insecta
- Order: Lepidoptera
- Superfamily: Noctuoidea
- Family: Euteliidae
- Genus: Paectes
- Species: P. abrostoloides

Binomial name
- Paectes abrostoloides (Guenée, 1852)

Synonyms
- Ingura abrostoloides Guenée, 1852; Edema producta Walker, 1855

= Paectes abrostoloides =

Species of moth

Paectes abrostoloides, the large paectes moth or sweetgum defoliator, is a moth of the family Euteliidae. The species was first described by Achille Guenée in 1852. It is found in the US from Massachusetts to Florida, west to Arizona and north to Utah. It has also been recorded from the Antilles and Honduras.

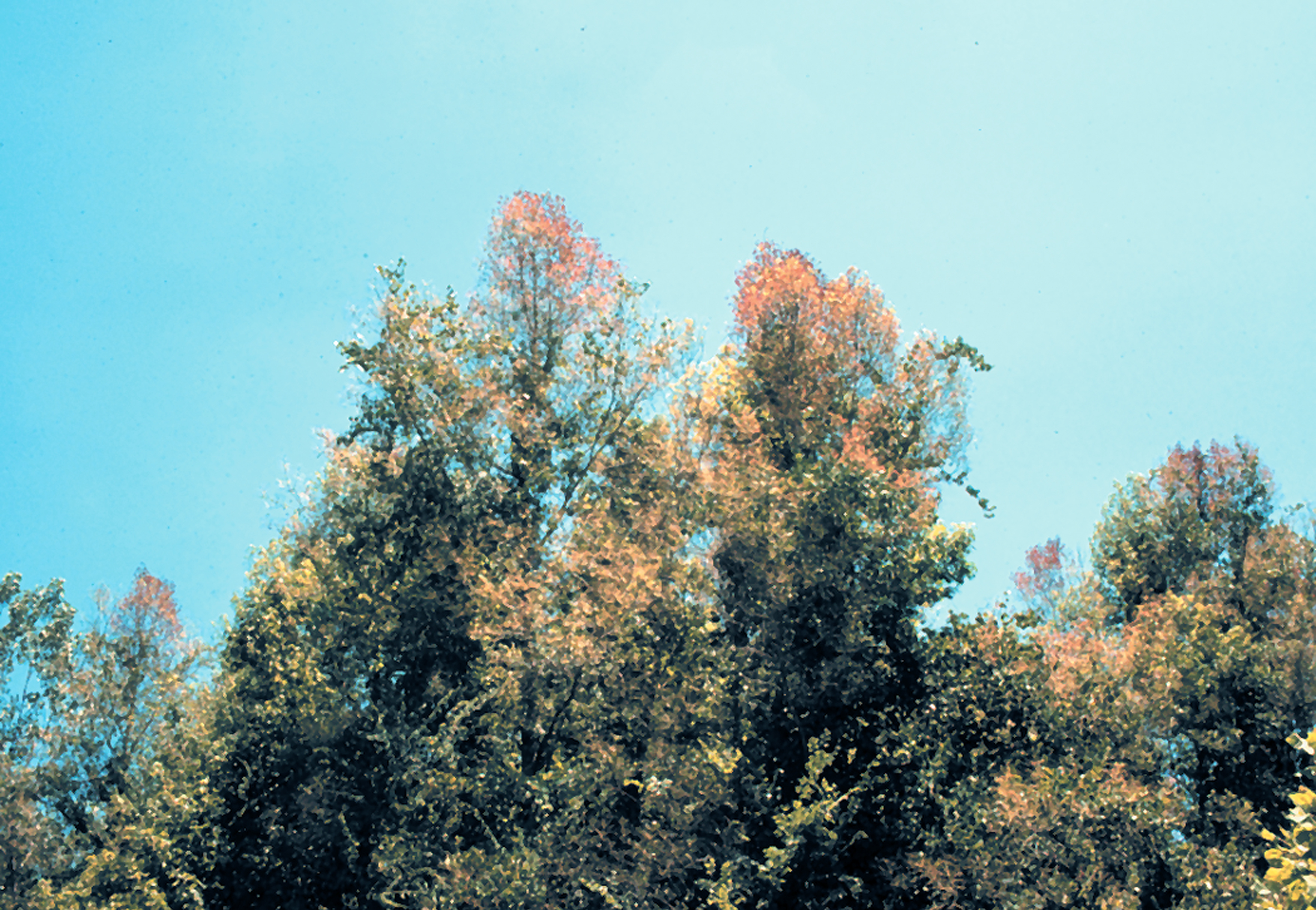
Damage

The wingspan is 27–32 mm. Adult are on wing from April to October.

The larvae feed on the leaves of Liquidambar styraciflua.
