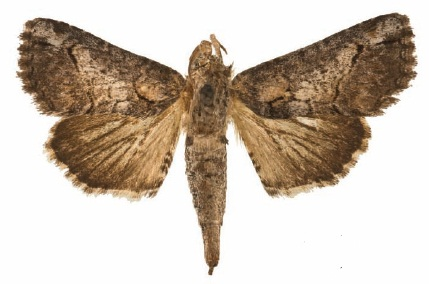
- Male
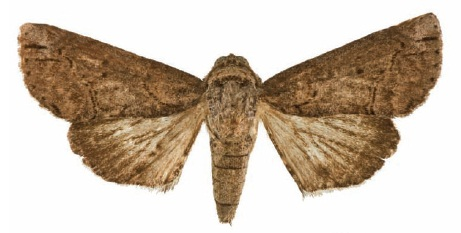
- Female

Scientific classification
- Domain: Eukaryota
- Kingdom: Animalia
- Phylum: Arthropoda
- Class: Insecta
- Order: Lepidoptera
- Superfamily: Noctuoidea
- Family: Euteliidae
- Genus: Paectes
- Species: P. medialba

Binomial name
- Paectes medialba Pogue, 2013

= Paectes medialba =

Species of moth

Paectes medialba is a moth in the family Euteliidae first described by Michael G. Pogue in 2013. It is found in north-western Argentina.

The forewing length is 9.4 mm for males and 9.9 mm for females. The costal area of the forewings is dark gray mottled with white scales and faint white dashes along the costa from just beyond the middle to below the apex. There is a distinct ovate basal spot and a few dark gray and white scales basally, the remainder of the scales is tan. The hindwings are white, with dark gray marginal shading. The veins are highlighted with dark gray and the anal fold has a white and dark-gray striped pattern.

== Etymology ==
The species name is derived from the combination of the Latin terms medius (meaning middle) and albus (meaning white) and refers to the white medial area of the male forewing.
