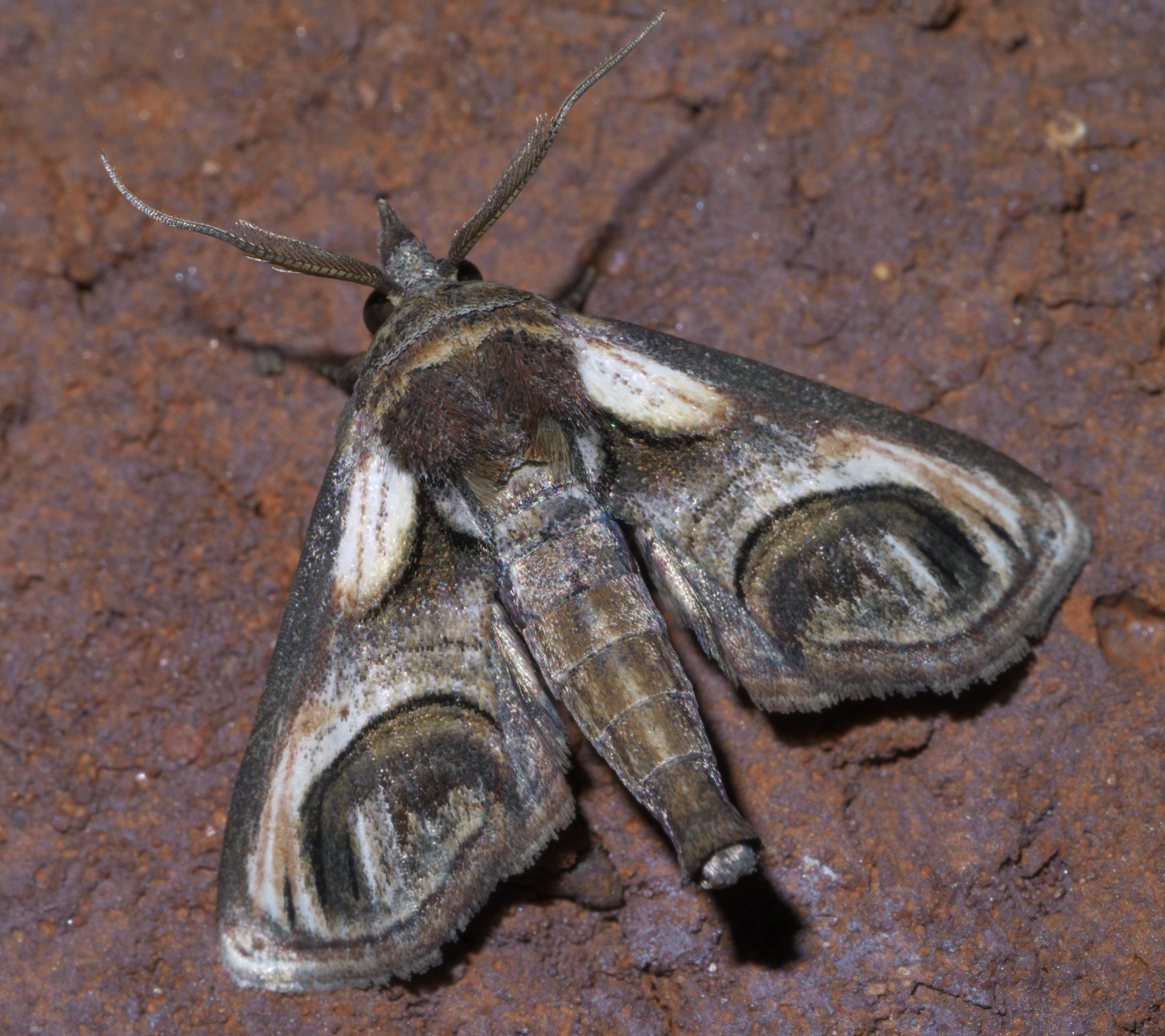

Scientific classification
- Kingdom: Animalia
- Phylum: Arthropoda
- Class: Insecta
- Order: Lepidoptera
- Superfamily: Noctuoidea
- Family: Euteliidae
- Genus: Paectes
- Species: P. oculatrix

Binomial name
- Paectes oculatrix (Guenee, 1852)

= Paectes oculatrix =

Species of moth

Paectes oculatrix, the eyed paectes, is a moth in the family Euteliidae. The species was first described by Achille Guenée in 1852. It is found in North America.

The MONA or Hodges number for Paectes oculatrix is 8957.
