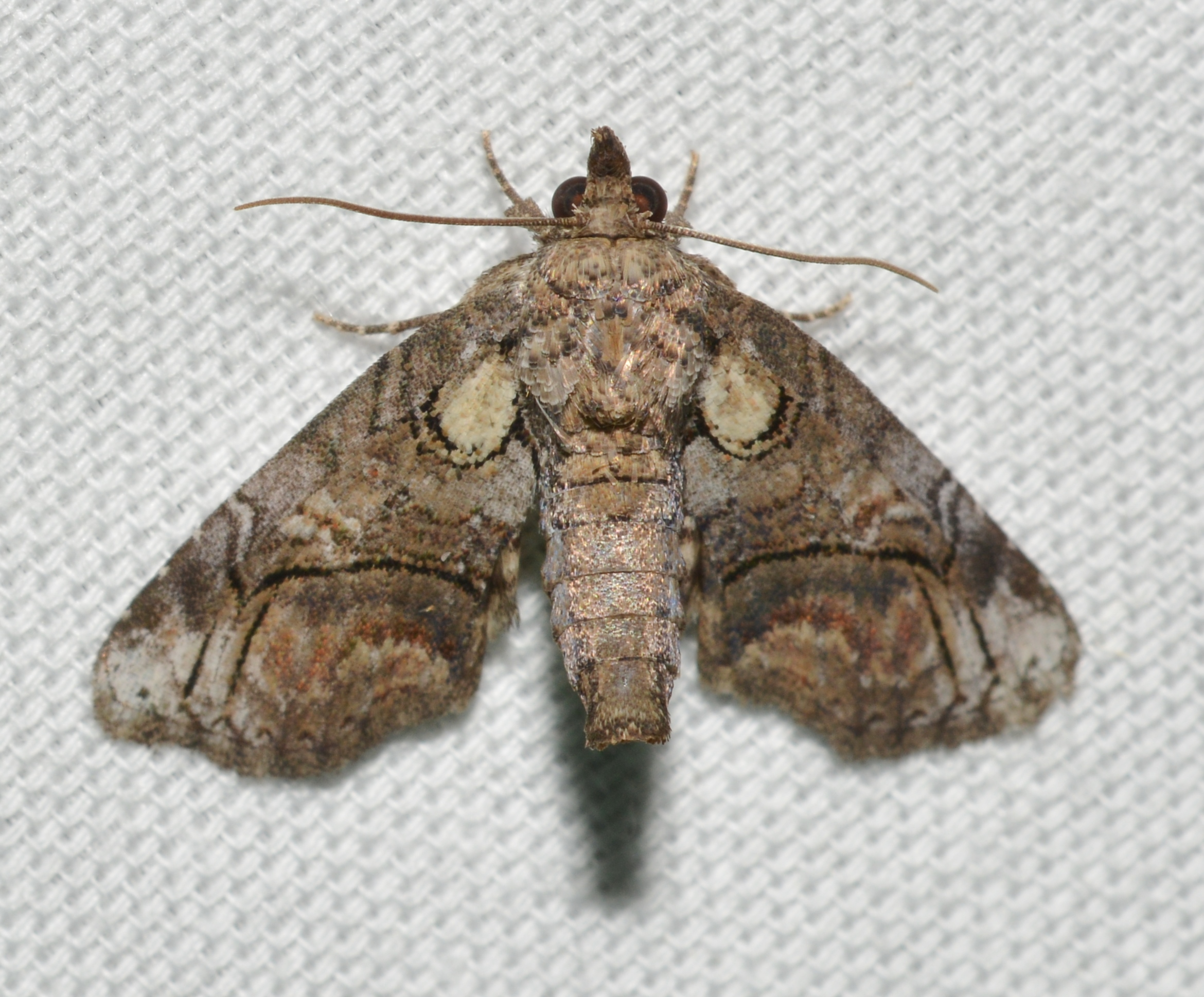

Scientific classification
- Kingdom: Animalia
- Phylum: Arthropoda
- Clade: Pancrustacea
- Class: Insecta
- Order: Lepidoptera
- Superfamily: Noctuoidea
- Family: Euteliidae
- Genus: Paectes
- Species: P. pygmaea

Binomial name
- Paectes pygmaea Hübner, 1818

Synonyms
- Paectes flabella (Grote, 1879)

= Paectes pygmaea =

Species of moth

Paectes pygmaea, the pygmy paectes, is a species of moth in the family Euteliidae. The species was first described by Jacob Hübner in 1818. It is found in North America.

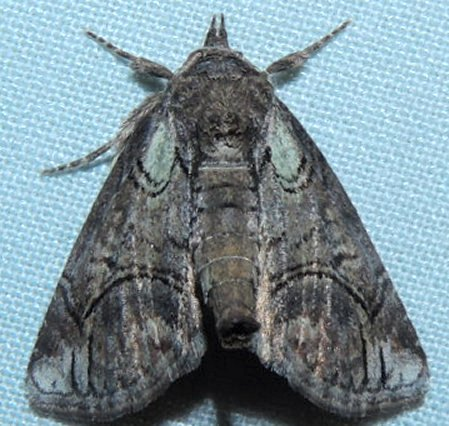
Pygmy paectes, Paectes pygmaea

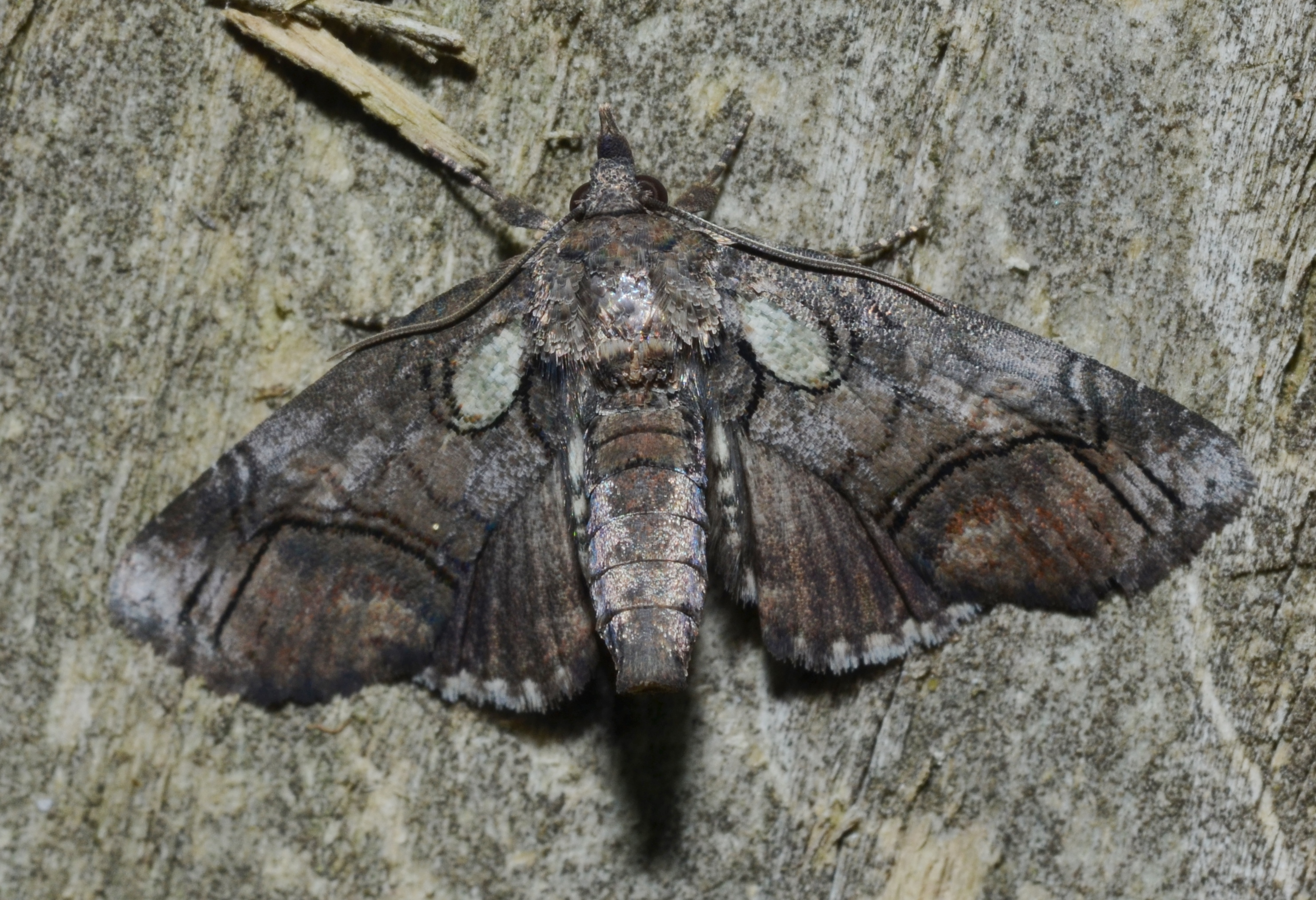
Pygmy paectes, Paectes pygmaea
