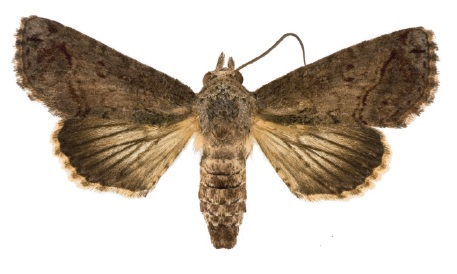
- Female
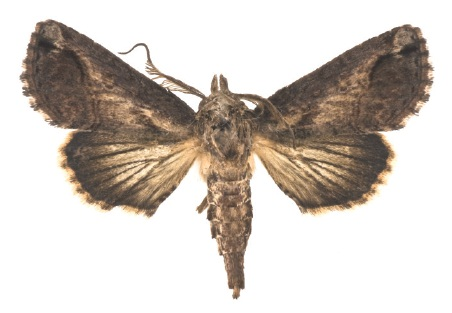
- Male

Scientific classification
- Domain: Eukaryota
- Kingdom: Animalia
- Phylum: Arthropoda
- Class: Insecta
- Order: Lepidoptera
- Superfamily: Noctuoidea
- Family: Euteliidae
- Genus: Paectes
- Species: P. longiformis

Binomial name
- Paectes longiformis Pogue, 2012

= Paectes longiformis =

Species of moth

Paectes longiformis is a moth in the family Euteliidae first described by Michael G. Pogue in 2012. It is found in the north-eastern Brazilian state of Bahia.

The larvae have been reared from Schinus terebinthifolius.
