= Paectes nubifera =

Scientific classification
- Kingdom: Animalia
- Phylum: Arthropoda
- Class: Insecta
- Order: Lepidoptera
- Superfamily: Noctuoidea
- Family: Euteliidae
- Genus: Paectes
- Species: P. nubifera

Binomial name
- Paectes nubifera Hampson, 1912

Species of moth

Paectes nubifera is a species of moth in the family Euteliidae. It is found in North America.

The MONA or Hodges number for Paectes nubifera is 8965.
