= Paectes abrostolella =

Scientific classification
- Kingdom: Animalia
- Phylum: Arthropoda
- Class: Insecta
- Order: Lepidoptera
- Superfamily: Noctuoidea
- Family: Euteliidae
- Genus: Paectes
- Species: P. abrostolella

Binomial name
- Paectes abrostolella (Walker, 1866)

Species of moth

Paectes abrostolella is a species of moth in the family Euteliidae. It is found in North America.

The MONA or Hodges number for Paectes abrostolella is 8959.1.
