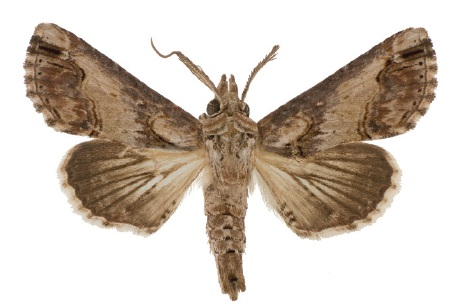
- Paectes arcigera

Scientific classification
- Kingdom: Animalia
- Phylum: Arthropoda
- Clade: Pancrustacea
- Class: Insecta
- Order: Lepidoptera
- Superfamily: Noctuoidea
- Family: Euteliidae
- Subfamily: Euteliinae
- Genus: Paectes; Hübner, 1818

Synonyms
- Tribonophora Hübner, 1808 (Suppr.); Ingura Guenée, 1852; Adrana Walker, 1858; Orthoclostera Butler, 1878; Callingura Butler, 1894

= Paectes =

Genus of moths

Paectes is a genus of moths of the family Euteliidae erected by Jacob Hübner in 1818.

== Description ==
Palpi upturned, reaching just above vertex of head. Thorax smoothly scaled. Abdomen with tufts on first segment and very long, with a large anal tubular tuft especially in male. Forewing with nearly straight costa, rectangular apex, obliquely curved outer margin and near base lobed inner margin. in most species, antennae of male bipectinated and tibia hairy. And in some, antennae of male pectinated for two-thirds of length and fore tibia with a tuft of long hair from femur-tibia joint.

== Species ==
- Paectes abrostolella Walker, 1866
- Paectes abrostoloides Guenée, 1852
- Paectes acutangula Hampson, 1912
- Paectes arcigera Guenée, 1852
- Paectes asper Pogue, 2013
- Paectes costistrigata Bethune-Baker, 1906
- Paectes cyanodes Turner, 1902
- Paectes declinata Grote, 1879
- Paectes delineata Guenée, 1852
- Paectes fuscescens Walker, 1855
- Paectes longiformis Pogue, 2012
- Paectes lunodes (Guenée, 1852)
- Paectes medialba Pogue, 2013
- Paectes nana (Walker, 1865)
- Paectes nubifera Hampson, 1912
- Paectes obrotunda Guenée, 1852
- Paectes oculatrix Guenée, 1852
- Paectes pygmaea Hübner, 1818 (syn: Paectes flabella (Grote, 1879))
- Paectes silvaini Barbut & Lalanne-Cassou, 2005
- Paectes similis Pogue, 2013
- Paectes sinuosa Pogue, 2013
- Paectes tumida Pogue, 2013
