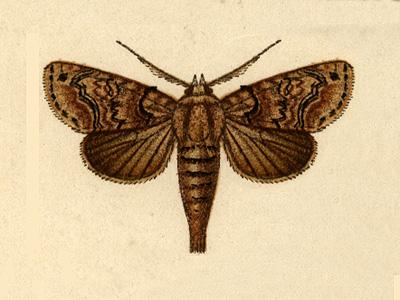

Scientific classification
- Kingdom: Animalia
- Phylum: Arthropoda
- Class: Insecta
- Order: Lepidoptera
- Superfamily: Noctuoidea
- Family: Euteliidae
- Genus: Paectes
- Species: P. fuscescens

Binomial name
- Paectes fuscescens (Walker, 1855)

Synonyms
- Edema fuscescens Walker, 1855; Adrada pseudopsis Walker, 1858

= Paectes fuscescens =

Species of moth

Paectes fuscescens is a moth of the family Euteliidae first described by Francis Walker in 1855. It is found from Central America to Paraguay and Brazil and on the Antilles.
