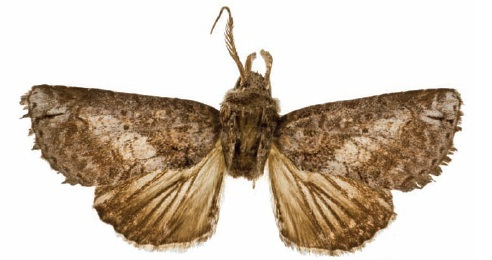
- Male
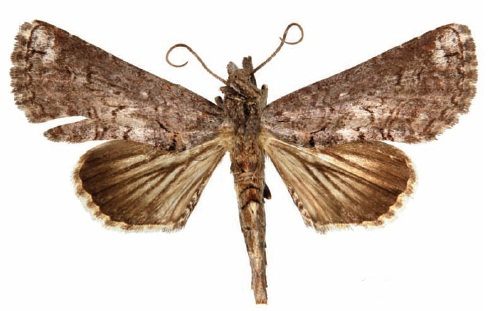
- Female

Scientific classification
- Domain: Eukaryota
- Kingdom: Animalia
- Phylum: Arthropoda
- Class: Insecta
- Order: Lepidoptera
- Superfamily: Noctuoidea
- Family: Euteliidae
- Genus: Paectes
- Species: P. tumida

Binomial name
- Paectes tumida Pogue, 2013

= Paectes tumida =

Species of moth

Paectes tumida is a moth in the family Euteliidae first described by Michael G. Pogue in 2013. It is found in Colombia (Villavicencio), Guyana, Suriname and French Guiana.

The forewing length is 10.9 mm for males and 11.5 mm for females. The costal area of the forewings is brown. The basal area is a mixture of white, pale-ferruginous and brown scales. There is a not well-defined ovate spot. The hindwings have a marginal shading of dark gray and the veins are heavily highlighted in dark gray. The areas between the veins are white. The anal fold is white with a dark-gray striped pattern.

== Etymology ==
The specific name is derived from the Latin tumeo (meaning swell) and refers to the swollen base of the free saccular extension in the male genitalia.
