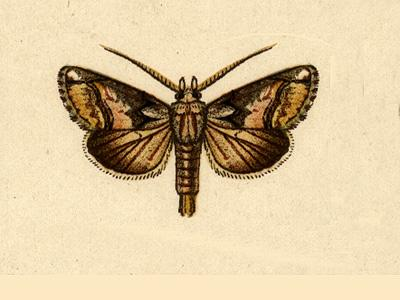

Scientific classification
- Kingdom: Animalia
- Phylum: Arthropoda
- Class: Insecta
- Order: Lepidoptera
- Superfamily: Noctuoidea
- Family: Euteliidae
- Genus: Paectes
- Species: P. obrotunda

Binomial name
- Paectes obrotunda (Guenée, 1852)

Synonyms
- Ingura obrotunda Guenée in Boisduval and Guenée, 1852

= Paectes obrotunda =

Species of moth

Paectes obrotunda is a moth of the family Euteliidae first described by Achille Guenée in 1852. It is found in Brazil. The species is only known from the female holotype. Formerly, the species was recorded from Southern North America (including Florida) through Central America to South America. It is also found on the Greater Antilles and Lesser Antilles. These records were based on misidentifications.

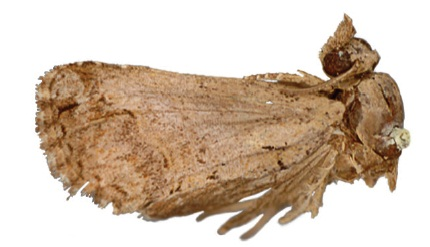
Left forewing

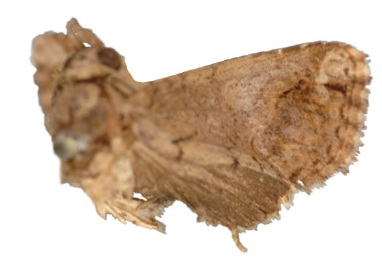
Right forewing

The forewing length is 9.2mm for females. There are a few white scales forming short dashes along the costa, especially from the postmedial band to just below the apex. There is a thin black antemedial line running from the posterior margin, forming ventral border to the faint basal spot. The medial area of the wing has some scattered white scales forming an indistinct area proximal to the postmedial line. This postmedial line is black and faint at the posterior margin, becoming more distinct prior to a subapical, marginal black dash. The apical spot is white and the terminal line consists of a series of black, recurved lines between the veins. The hindwings have a dark gray marginal band that extends to the middle of the wing with the veins highlighted in dark gray.
