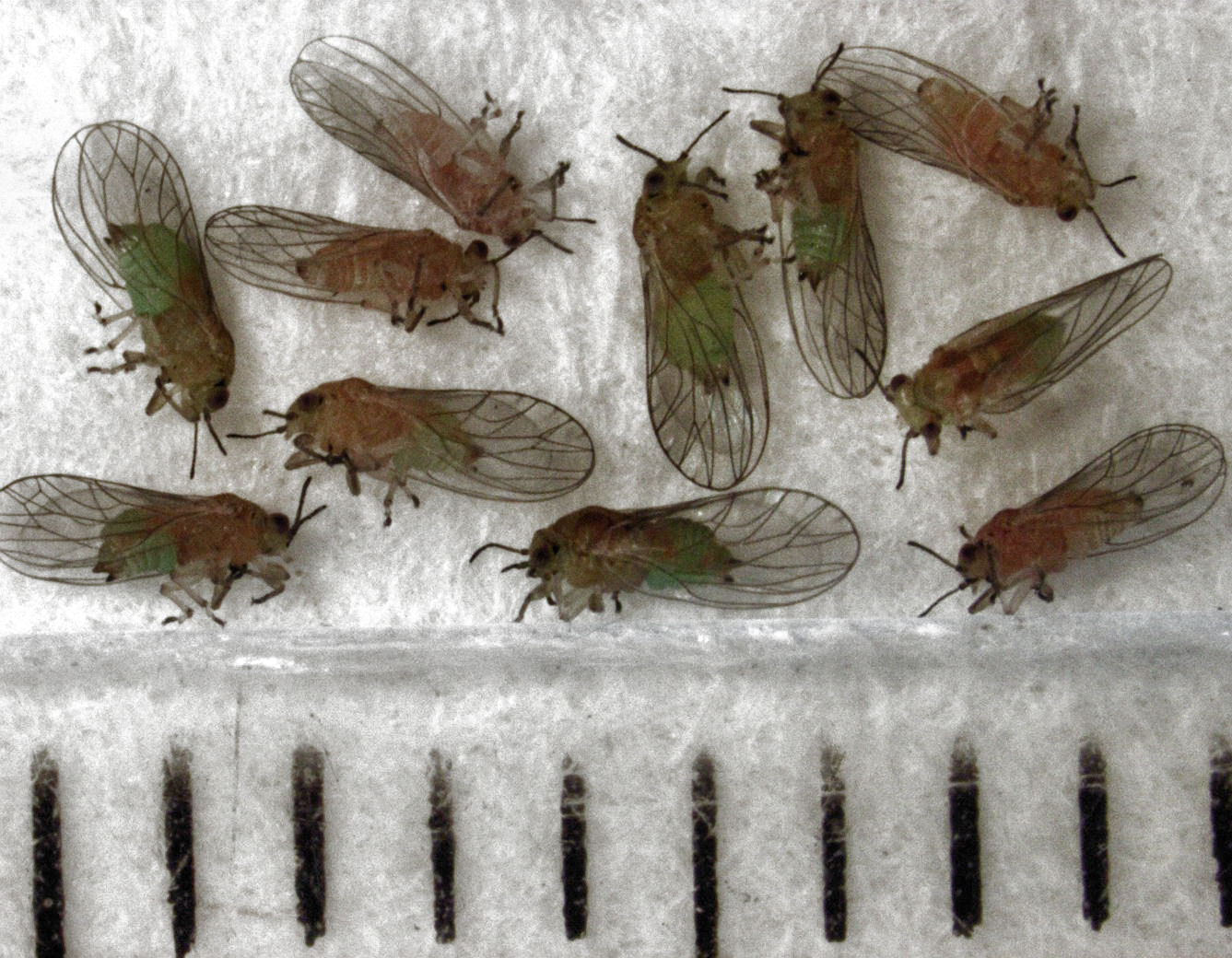

Scientific classification
- Domain: Eukaryota
- Kingdom: Animalia
- Phylum: Arthropoda
- Class: Insecta
- Order: Hemiptera
- Suborder: Sternorrhyncha
- Superfamily: Psylloidea
- Family: Calophyidae
- Genus: Calophya
- Species: C. schini

Binomial name
- Calophya schini Tuthill, 1959

= Calophya schini =

Species of true bug

Calophya schini is a psyllid common on Schinus molle with a wide distribution wherever this tree has been distributed as a garden ornamental.

== Distribution ==
C. schini is endemic to Central America but widespread further distribution including USA and New Zealand.

== Description ==
The adult, with wings folded, is 2mm long. Generally orange to pale yellow or green coloured, wings hyaline. Nymphs produce marked dimples on the leaves and in large numbers cause severe malformations.

== Gallery ==
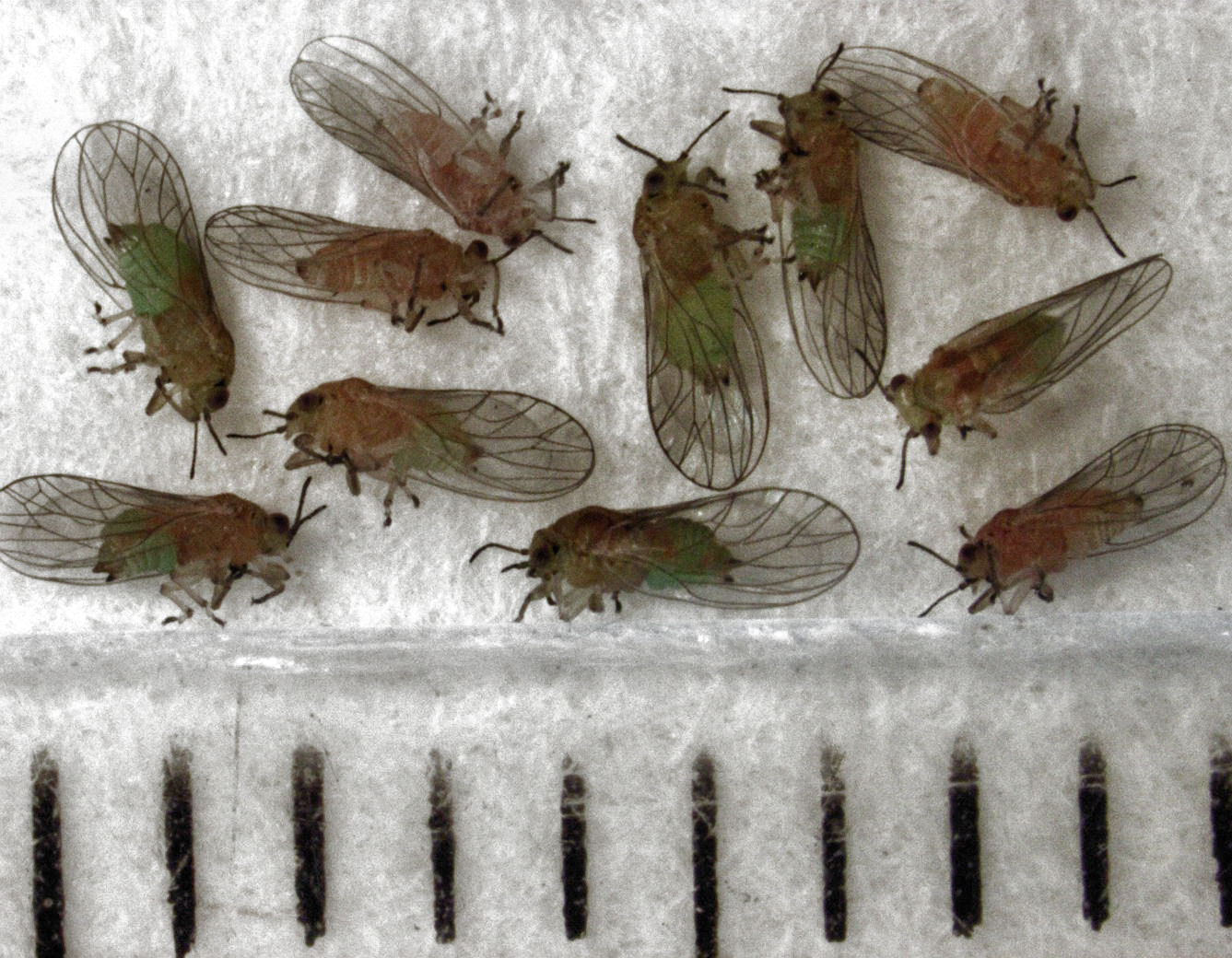
Calophya schini, adults with scale

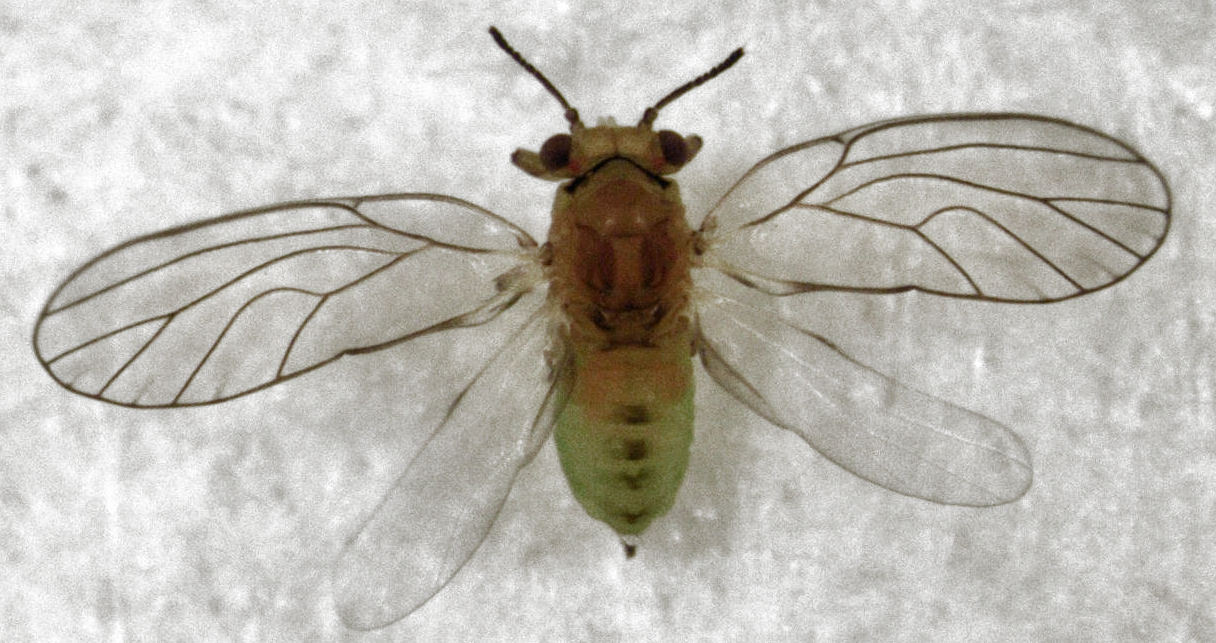
Calophya schini, adult female

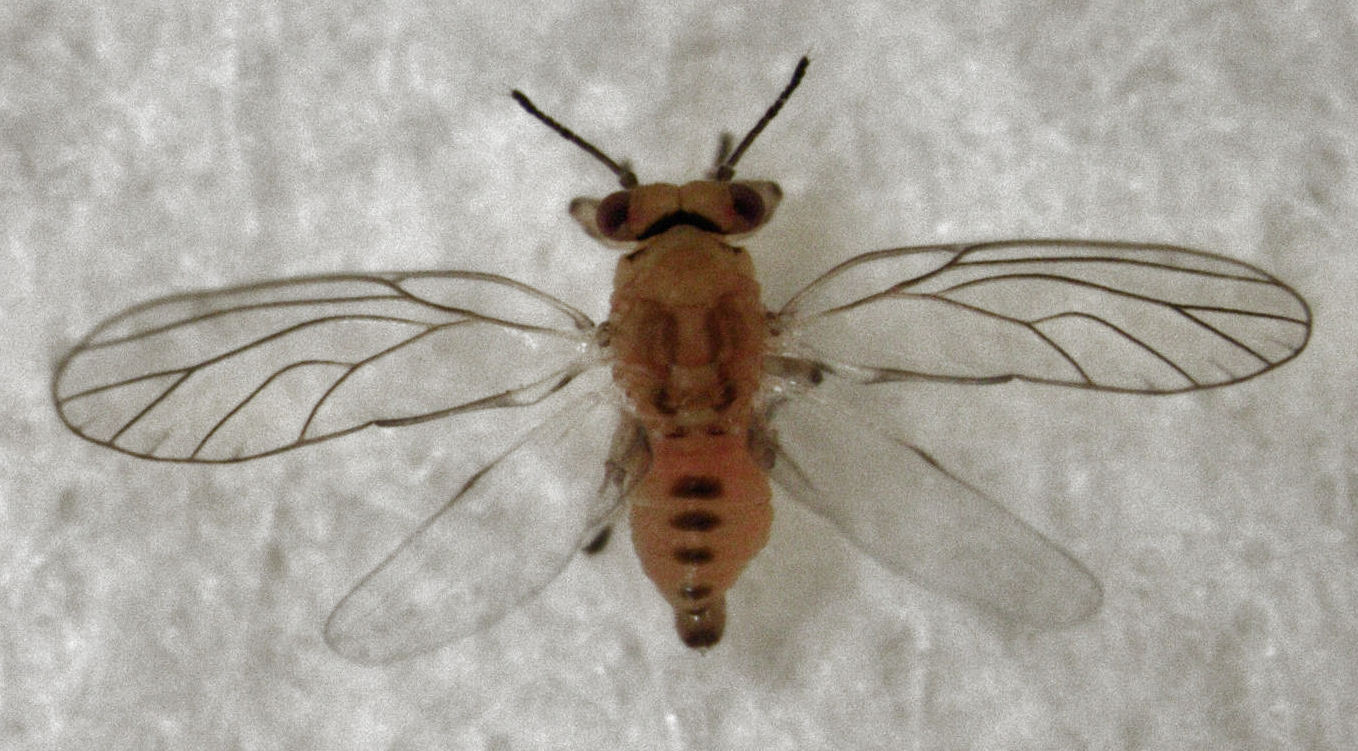
Calophya schini, adult male

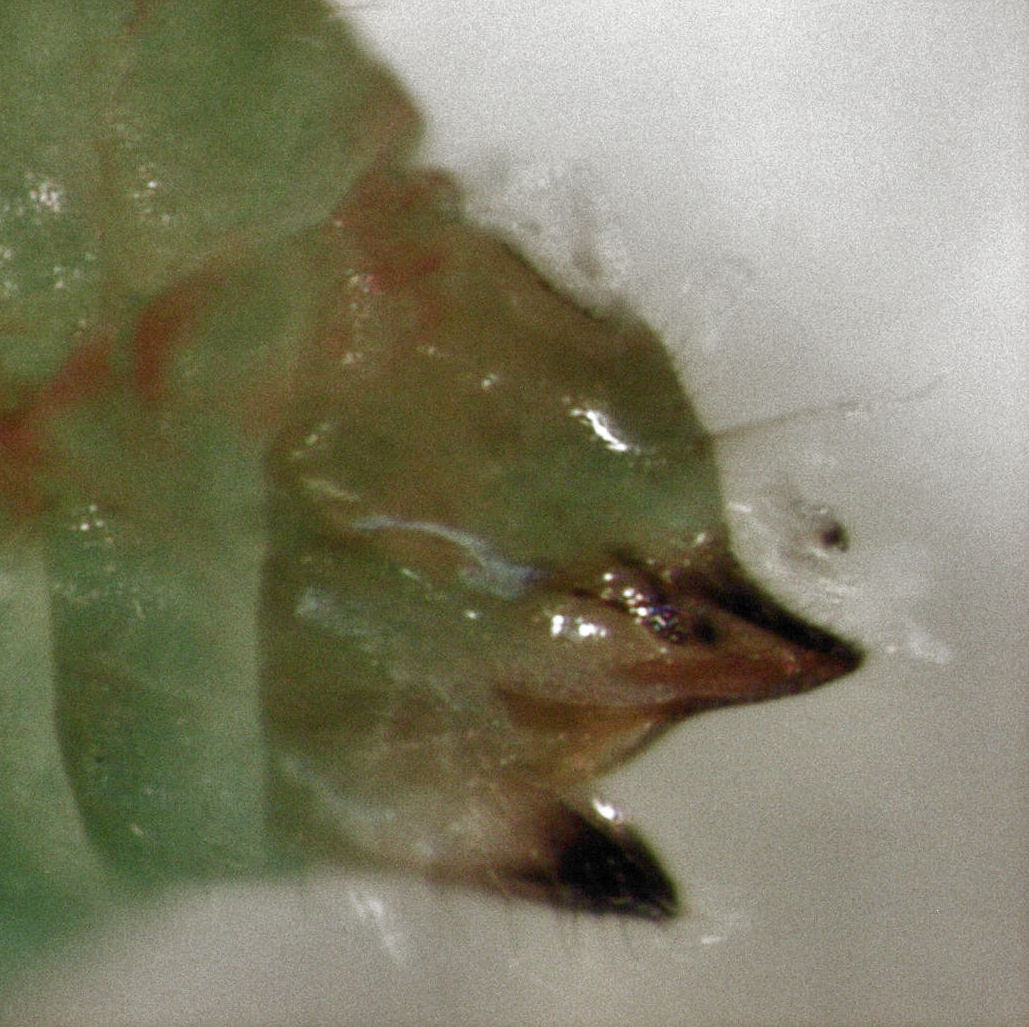
Calophya schini, female terminalia

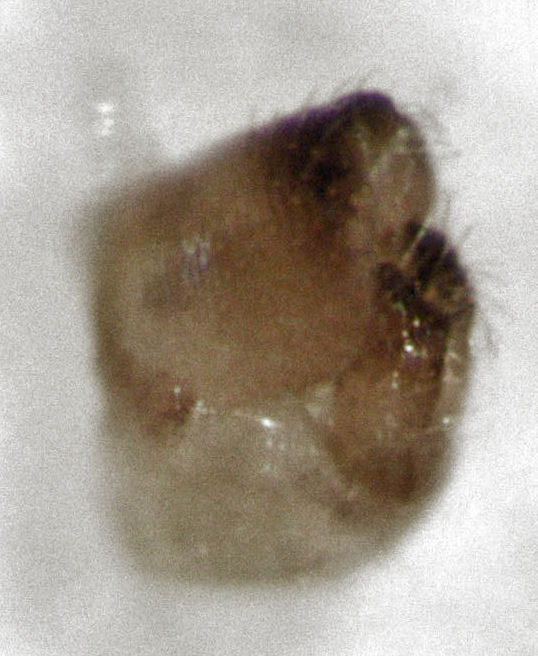
Calophya schini, male terminalia

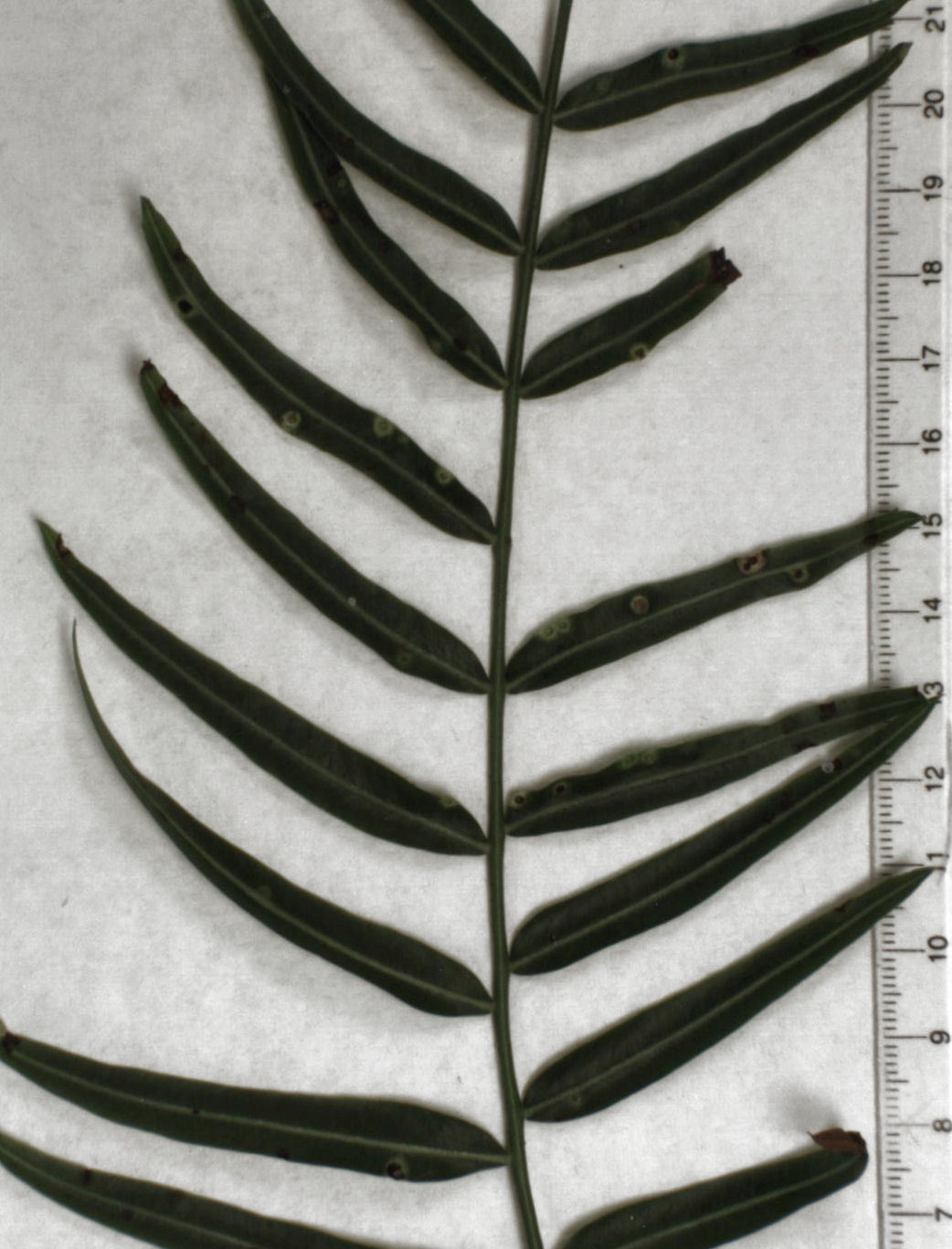
Calophya schini pit galls on Schinus molle

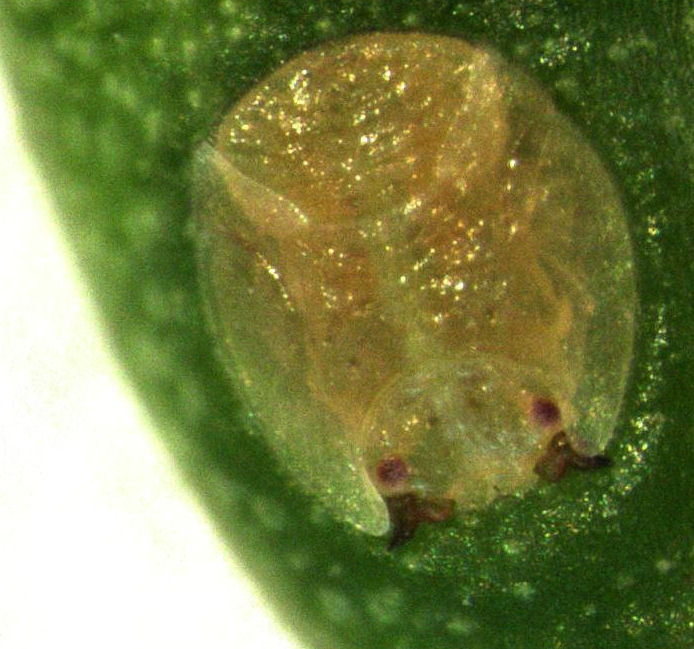
Calophya schini larva in pit gall on Schinus molle

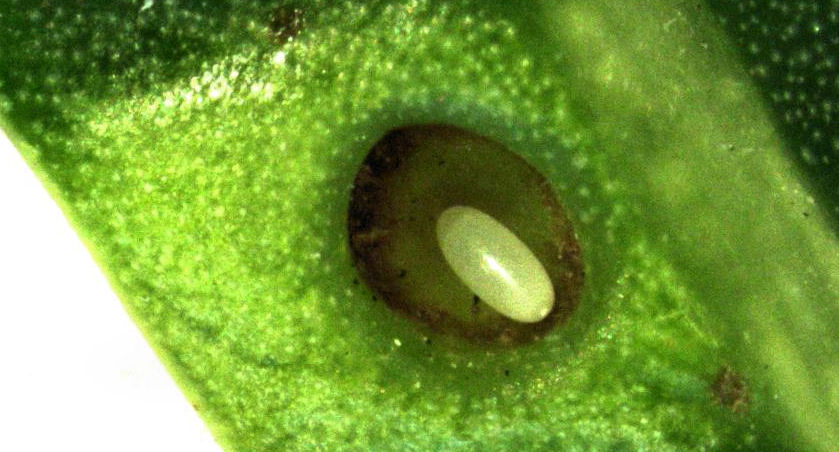
Presumed egg of Calophya schini in pit gall on Schinus molle
