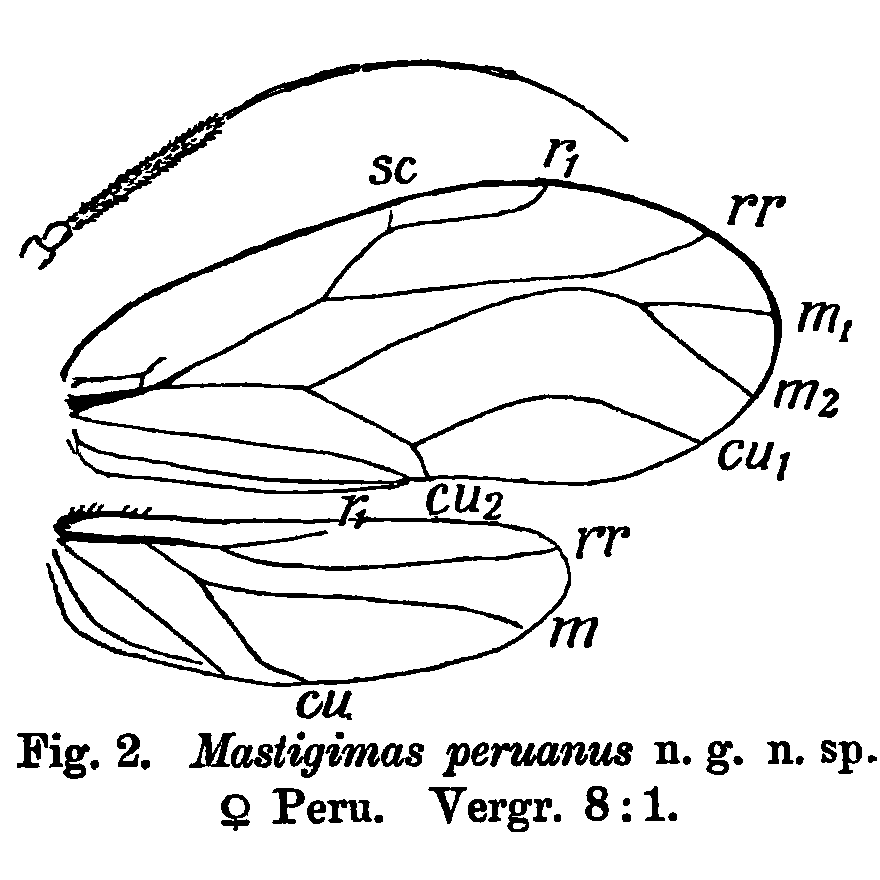
- Characteristic features of Mastigimas peruanus

Scientific classification
- Kingdom: Animalia
- Phylum: Arthropoda
- Class: Insecta
- Order: Hemiptera
- Suborder: Sternorrhyncha
- Superfamily: Psylloidea
- Family: Mastigimatidae; Bekker-Migdisova, 1973

= Mastigimatidae =

Family of true bugs

Mastigimatidae is a family of plant lice containing genera placed previously in the Calophyidae and recently (2021) restored. The type genus Mastigimas was erected by Günther Enderlein in 1921.

== Genera ==
The genera now placed here include:

1. Bharatiana Mathur, 1973 - Asia
2. Mastigimas Enderlein, 1921 - Americas
3. Synpsylla Yang, 1984 - monotypic S. wendlandiae Yang, 1984 - Taiwan
4. Toonapsylla Burckhardt, Sharma & Raman, 2018 - monotypic T. cedrelae (Kieffer, 1905) - Indochina
