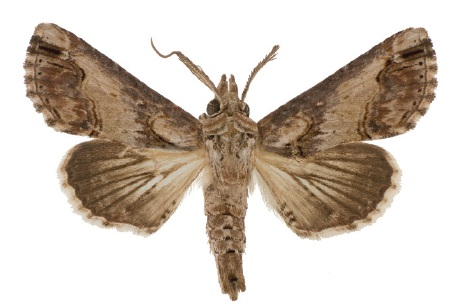
- Male
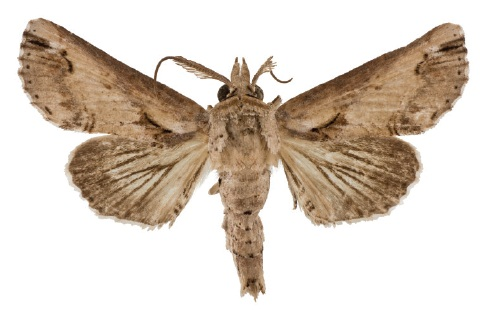
- Male

Scientific classification
- Kingdom: Animalia
- Phylum: Arthropoda
- Class: Insecta
- Order: Lepidoptera
- Superfamily: Noctuoidea
- Family: Euteliidae
- Genus: Paectes
- Species: P. arcigera

Binomial name
- Paectes arcigera (Guenée, 1852)

Synonyms
- Ingura arcigera Guenée in Boisduval and Guenée 1852

= Paectes arcigera =

Species of moth

Paectes arcigera is a moth in the family Euteliidae first described by Achille Guenée in 1852. It is restricted to the eastern Caribbean Islands, ranging from Puerto Rico to the Lesser Antilles (including the U.S. Virgin Islands, the British Virgin Islands, Guadeloupe, Dominica, St. Lucia and Trinidad).

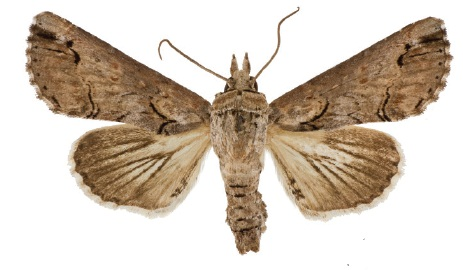
Female

The length of the forewings is 9.5–12.2 mm for males and 9.8–11.6 mm for females. The costal area of the forewings is gray. There is an ovate white basal spot in the ventral half and pale gray white-tipped scales in the dorsal half. The antemedial line is thin and black and forms the ventral border of the basal spot. The medial area between the antemedial and postmedial lines is mostly white mixed with pale gray scales. The hindwings have dark gray marginal shading and the veins are highlighted in dark gray, with white between the veins and at the base. The anal fold has a white and dark gray striped pattern. Adults are probably on wing throughout the year.
