= Paectes declinata =

Scientific classification
- Kingdom: Animalia
- Phylum: Arthropoda
- Class: Insecta
- Order: Lepidoptera
- Superfamily: Noctuoidea
- Family: Euteliidae
- Genus: Paectes
- Species: P. declinata

Binomial name
- Paectes declinata (Grote, 1879)

Species of moth

Paectes declinata is a species of moth in the family Euteliidae. It is found in North America.

The MONA or Hodges number for Paectes declinata is 8961.
