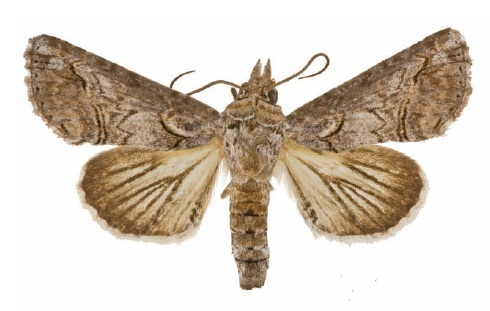
- Female

Scientific classification
- Kingdom: Animalia
- Phylum: Arthropoda
- Class: Insecta
- Order: Lepidoptera
- Superfamily: Noctuoidea
- Family: Euteliidae
- Genus: Paectes
- Species: P. asper

Binomial name
- Paectes asper Pogue, 2013

= Paectes asper =

- Male

Species of moth

Paectes asper is a moth in the family Euteliidae first described by Michael G. Pogue in 2013. It is widespread from southern Florida and the Bahamas to the Greater Antilles (except Puerto Rico), and the British Virgin Islands, U.S. Virgin Islands, and Dominica in the Lesser Antilles.

The forewing length is 9.4–12.9 mm for males and forewing length 9.2–12.5 mm for females. The costal area of the forewings is dark gray and ferruginous. There is a distinct ovate basal spot. The antemedial line is black, sharply angulate basally and continues around the ventral margin of the ovate spot. It is arrowhead shaped. The hindwings are white, with dark gray marginal shading. The veins are highlighted dark gray and the anal fold has a white and dark-gray striped pattern.

== Etymology ==
The specific name is the Latin term for rough, which refers to the roughened texture of the apex of the free saccular extension in the male genitalia.
