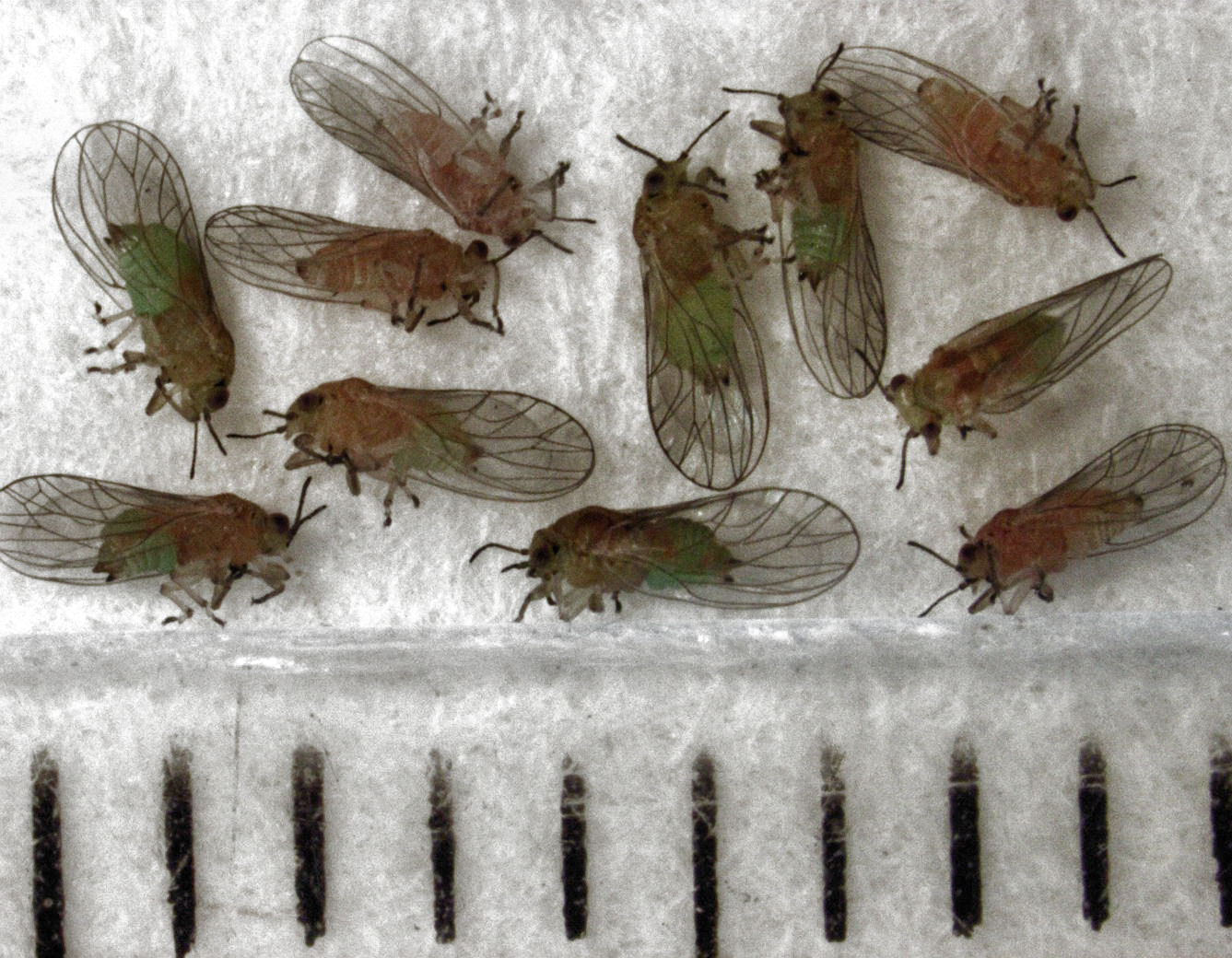
- Calophya schini, adults with scale

Scientific classification
- Domain: Eukaryota
- Kingdom: Animalia
- Phylum: Arthropoda
- Class: Insecta
- Order: Hemiptera
- Suborder: Sternorrhyncha
- Superfamily: Psylloidea
- Family: Calophyidae
- Genus: Calophya; Löw, 1879

Synonyms
- Holotrioza; Microceropsylla; Neocalophya; Paracalophya; Pelmatobrachia

= Calophya =

Genus of true bugs

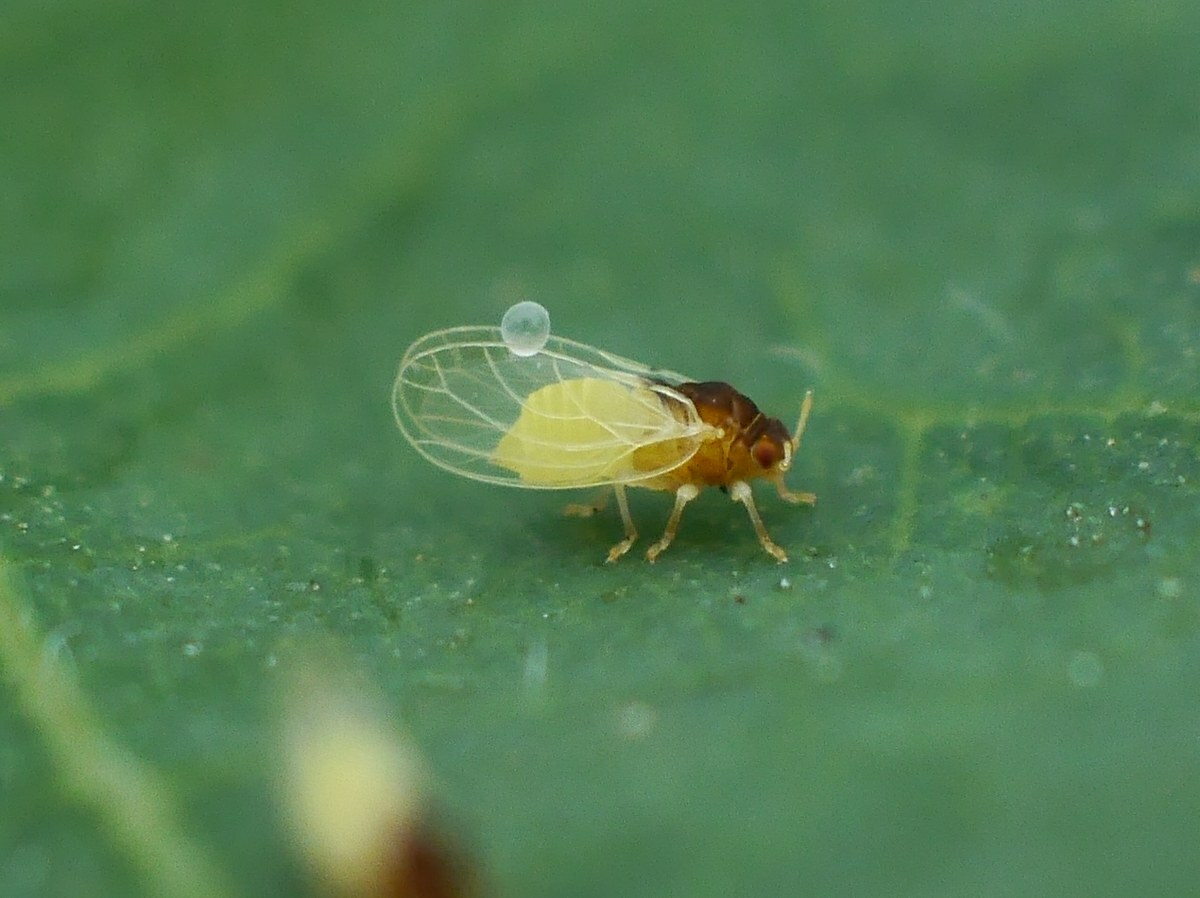
Calophya rhois, Ukraine

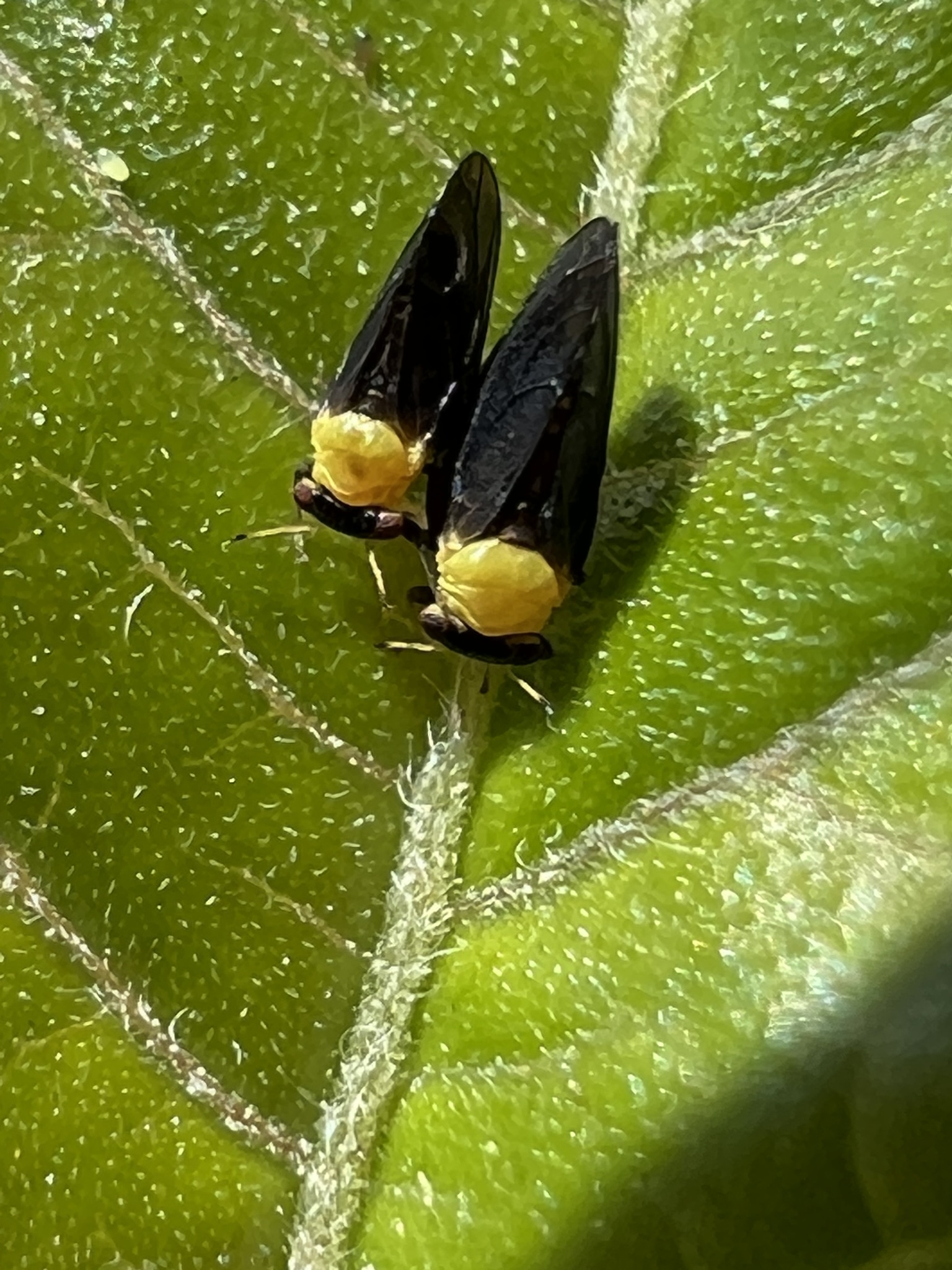
Calophya nigripennis, Virginia

Calophya is the type genus of the psyllid bug family Calophyidae.

== Species ==
These 69 species belong to the genus Calophya:

- Calophya actinodaphne Li, 2011
- Calophya acutipennis Tuthill, 1964
- Calophya andina Burckhardt & Basset, 2000
- Calophya angulipennis Brown & Hodkinson, 1988
- Calophya arcuata Caldwell, 1944
- Calophya aurea Tuthill, 1942
- Calophya brevicornis (Crawford, 1919)
- Calophya buchananiae (Miyatake, 1971)
- Calophya californica Schwarz, 1904
- Calophya catillicola Burckhardt & Basset, 2000
- Calophya chinensis Li, 1997
- Calophya clausa Burckhardt & Basset, 2000
- Calophya clavuligera Burckhardt & Basset, 2000
- Calophya dicksoni Jensen, 1957
- Calophya dubia Crawford, 1914
- Calophya duvauae (Scott, 1882)
- Calophya elaeocarpae Li, 2011
- Calophya evodiae Yang, 1984
- Calophya flavida Schwarz, 1904
- Calophya floricola Burckhardt & Basset, 2000
- Calophya fusca Brown & Hodkinson, 1988
- Calophya gallifex (Kieffer & Jörgensen, 1910)
- Calophya hermicitae Burckhardt & Basset, 2000
- Calophya hyalina Brown & Hodkinson, 1988
- Calophya latiforceps Burckhardt, 2011
- Calophya longispiculata (Mathur, 1975)
- Calophya lutea Burckhardt, 2018
- Calophya luzonensis Crawford, 1915
- Calophya maculata (Mathur, 1975)
- Calophya mammifex Burckhardt & Basset, 2000
- Calophya mangiferae Burckhardt & Basset, 2000
- Calophya melanocephala Li, 1997
- Calophya meliorata Yang, 1984
- Calophya minuta Tuthill, 1942
- Calophya miramariensis Brown & Hodkinson, 1988
- Calophya monticola Brown & Hodkinson, 1988
- Calophya nigra Kuwayama, 1908
- Calophya nigrella Jensen, 1957
- Calophya nigriconis Brown & Hodkinson, 1988
- Calophya nigridorsalis Kuwayama, 1908
- Calophya nigrilineata Brown & Hodkinson, 1988
- Calophya nigripennis Riley, 1885
- Calophya octimaculata Li, 2011
- Calophya orbicola Burckhardt & Basset, 2000
- Calophya oweni Tuthill, 1939
- Calophya pallidula McAtee, 1926
- Calophya patagonica Burckhardt & Basset, 2000
- Calophya phaeosticta Li, 2011
- Calophya phellodendri Loginova, 1976
- Calophya praestigiator Burckhardt, 2018
- Calophya rhicola Li, 1992
- Calophya rhois (Löw, 1877)
- Calophya rhopenjabensis Li, 2011
- Calophya rotundipennis White & Hodkinson, 1980
- Calophya rubra (Blanchard, 1852)
- Calophya schini Tuthill, 1959 (Pepper tree psyllid)
- Calophya scrobicola Burckhardt & Basset, 2000
- Calophya shinjii Sasaki, 1954
- Calophya spondiasae (Crawford, 1915)
- Calophya stigmotacta Brown & Hodkinson, 1988
- Calophya terebinthifolii Burckhardt & Basset, 2000
- Calophya triangula Yang, 1984
- Calophya triozomima Schwarz, 1904
- Calophya venusta (Tuthill, 1964)
- Calophya verrucosa (Mathur, 1975)
- Calophya verticis (Crawford, 1919)
- Calophya verticornis Kwon, 1983
- Calophya vertifuliginea Li, 2011
- Calophya washingtonia (Klyver, 1931)
