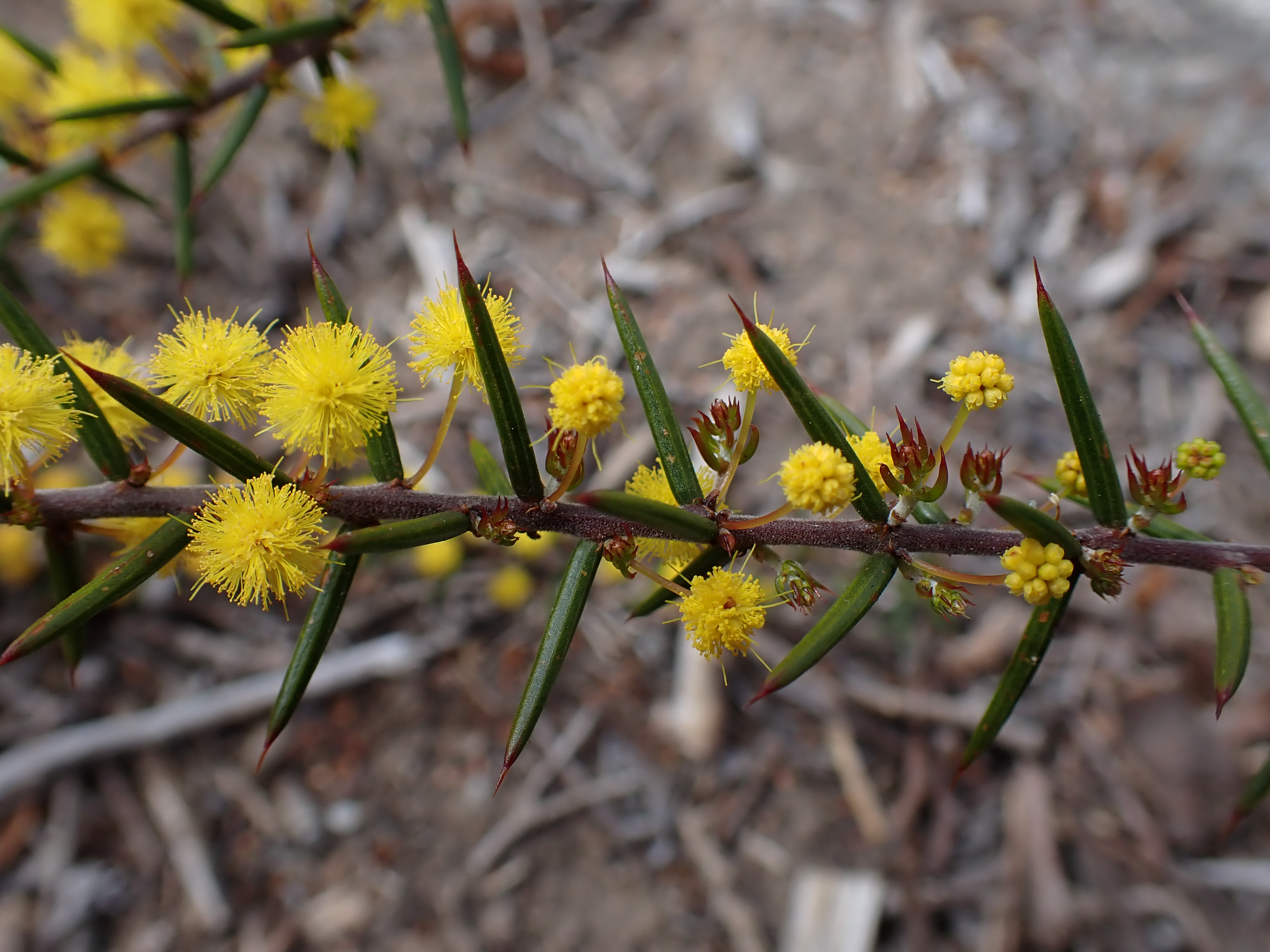

Conservation status
- Priority Four — Rare Taxa (DEC)

Scientific classification
- Kingdom: Plantae
- Clade: Tracheophytes
- Clade: Angiosperms
- Clade: Eudicots
- Clade: Rosids
- Order: Fabales
- Family: Fabaceae
- Subfamily: Caesalpinioideae
- Clade: Mimosoid clade
- Genus: Acacia
- Species: A. declinata

Binomial name
- Acacia declinata R.S.Cowan & Maslin
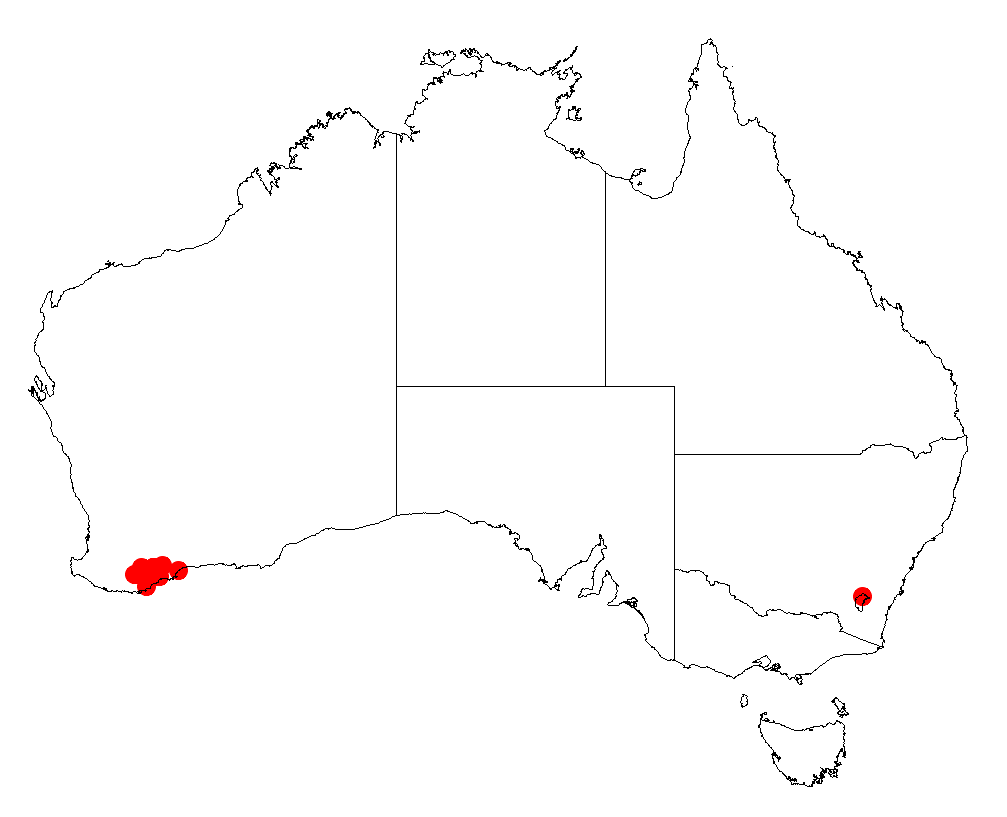
- Occurrence data from AVH

Synonyms
- Acacia aff. sulcata [P53] (A.M.Ashby 4603); Racosperma declinatum (R.S.Cowan & Maslin) Pedley

= Acacia declinata =

Species of legume

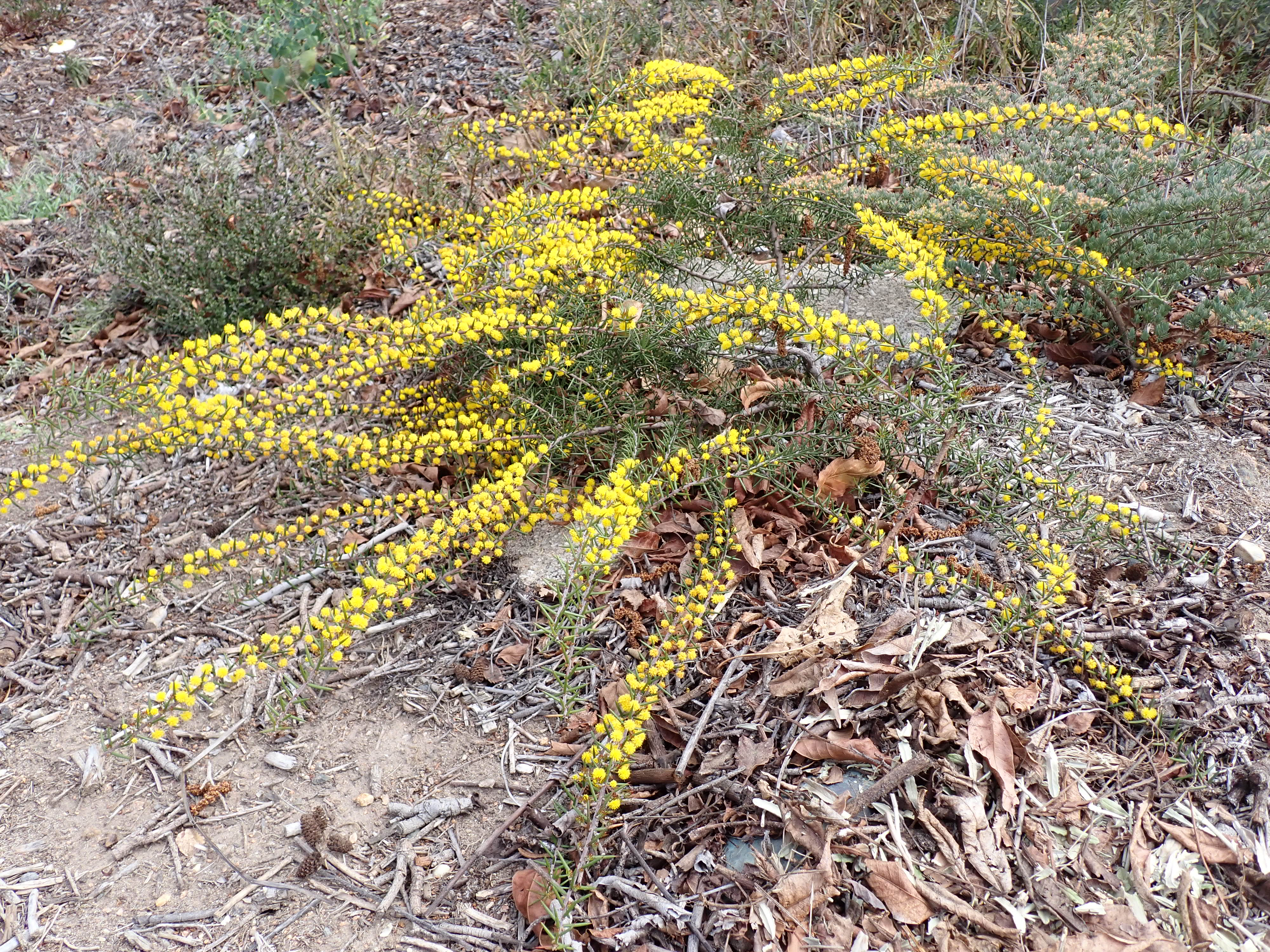
Habit, cultivated specimen

Acacia declinata is a species of flowering plant in the family Fabaceae and is endemic to the south-west of Western Australia. It is a prostrate shrub with sessile, sharply pointed phyllodes, spherical heads of golden yellow flowers and linear, thinly leathery pods.

== Description ==
Acacia declinata is a dense, intricately branched, prostrate shrub that typically grows to a height of 20–40 cm (7.9–15.7 in) with terete branchlets densely covered with short, soft hairs. Its phyllodes are sessile, sharply pointed and tapering with a rigid, brown tip and glabrous, 7–22 mm (0.28–0.87 in) long and 0.8–1.2 mm (0.031–0.047 in) wide. There are triangular to tapering, semi-persistent stipules up to 1 mm (0.039 in) long at the base of the phyllodes. The flowers are borne in one or two spherical heads in axils on a peduncle 4–8.5 mm (0.16–0.33 in) long, each head 4–6 mm (0.16–0.24 in) in diameter with 9 to 20 golden yellow flowers. Flowering occurs in August and September, and the pods are linear, thinly leathery, up to 30 mm (1.2 in) long and 2.0–2.5 mm (0.079–0.098 in) wide and strongly raised over the seeds. The seeds are oblong to broadly elliptic, about 2.5 mm (0.098 in) long and glossy black with a helmet shaped aril near the tip.

== Taxonomy ==
Acacia declinata was first formally described in 1990 by the botanists Richard Sumner Cowan and Bruce Maslin in The Western Australian Naturalist from specimens collected near Amelup by Alison Marjorie Ashby in 1972. The specific epithet (declinata) means 'growing downwards in a curve'.

== Distribution and habitat ==
This species of wattle is restricted to near Borden, Manypeaks and Boxwood Hill where it grows in tall shrubland and woodland in the Avon Wheatbelt, Esperance Plains, Jarrah Forest, Mallee and Swan Coastal Plain bioregions of south-western Western Australia.

== Conservation status ==
Acacia declinata in listed as "Priority Four" by the Government of Western Australia Department of Biodiversity, Conservation and Attractions, meaning that it is rare or near threatened.

== See also ==
- List of Acacia species
