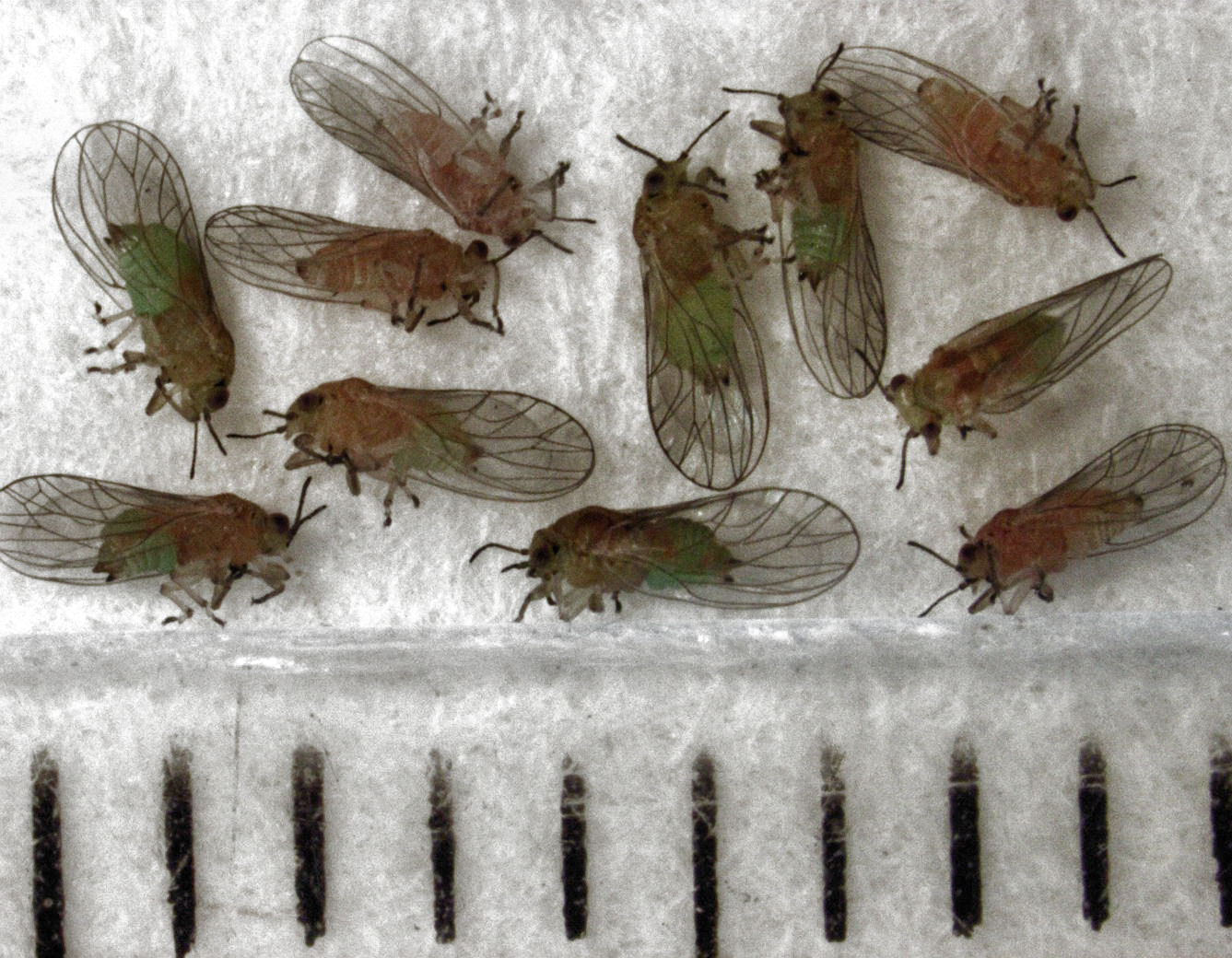
- Calophya schini, adults with scale

Scientific classification
- Kingdom: Animalia
- Phylum: Arthropoda
- Class: Insecta
- Order: Hemiptera
- Suborder: Sternorrhyncha
- Superfamily: Psylloidea
- Family: Calophyidae; Vondráček, 1957

= Calophyidae =

Family of true bugs

Calophyidae is a bug family in the superfamily Psylloidea.

== Subfamilies and genera ==
In a recent (2021) review, the following subfamilies were confirmed:

=== Atmetocraniinae ===
Authority: Becker-Migdisova, 1973; distribution: Australia, New Zealand

1. Atmetocranium Tuthill, 1952

=== Calophyinae ===
Authority: Vondráček, 1957; synonyms: Microceropsyllini Bekker-Migdisova, 1973, Strogylocephalidae Li, 2011

1. Calophya Löw, 1879` – type genus (syn. Calophya (Neocalophya), Holotrioza, Microceropsylla, Paracalophya, Pelmatobrachia)
2. Pseudoglycaspis Brown & Hodkinson, 1988
3. Strogylocephala Crawford, 1917 (syn. Synaphalara)

=== Metapsyllinae ===
Authority: Kwon, 1983; distribution: Asia

1. Metapsylla Kuwayama, 1908

=== Symphorosinae ===
Authority: Li, 2002

1. Symphorosus Li, 2002

Note

- Four genera previously placed here, are now included in the restored family Mastigimatidae Bekker-Migdisova, 1973, but currently (March 2026) remain here in some databases.
- Allophorina Hodkinson, 1991 is now assigned to the Psyllidae: Platycoryphinae;
- Cecidopsylla Kieffer, 1905 is now assigned to the Aphalaridae: Cecidopsyllinae;
- †Psyllites is a synonym of †Catopsylla Scudder, 1890 in the Aphalaridae.
