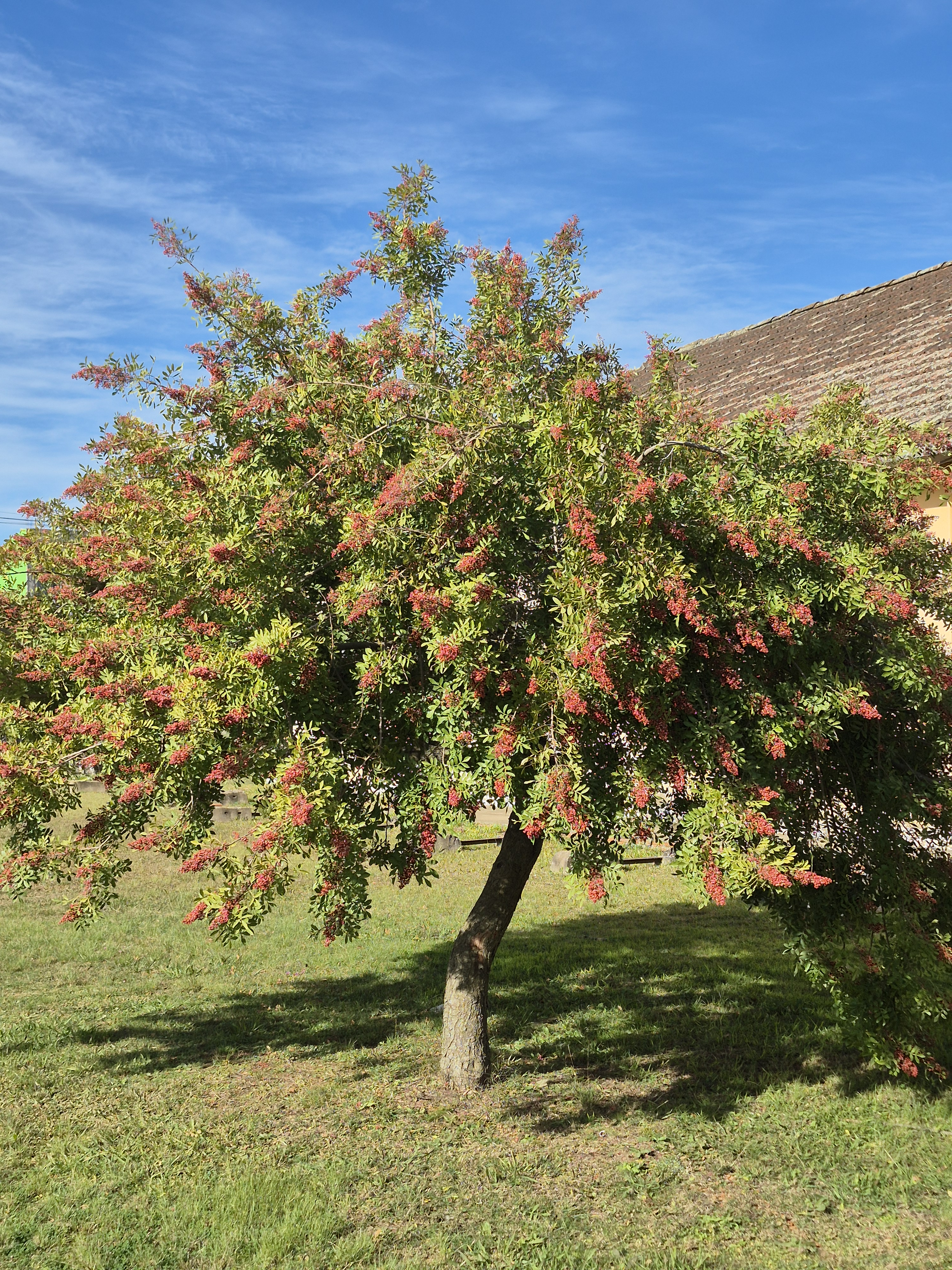
- Tree in Brazil

Scientific classification
- Kingdom: Plantae
- Clade: Tracheophytes
- Clade: Angiosperms
- Clade: Eudicots
- Clade: Rosids
- Order: Sapindales
- Family: Anacardiaceae
- Genus: Schinus
- Species: S. terebinthifolia

Binomial name
- Schinus terebinthifolia G. Raddi

= Schinus terebinthifolia =

Species of flowering plant in the cashew family

Schinus terebinthifolia is a species of flowering plant in the cashew family, Anacardiaceae, that is native to subtropical and tropical South America. Common names include Brazilian peppertree, aroeira, rose pepper, broadleaved pepper tree, wilelaiki (or wililaiki), Christmasberry tree and Florida holly. The species name has been very commonly misspelled as 'terebinthifolius'. (Note: The misspelling 'terebinthifolius' of [correct] Schinus terebinthifolia is due to considerable historic confusion as to the correct gender of the genus name; as of 2015, this has been resolved with the determination that the correct gender of Schinus is feminine (rather than masculine), and adjectival names within the genus must be spelled accordingly.)

== Description ==
Brazilian peppertree is a sprawling shrub or small tree, with a shallow root system, reaching a height of 7–10 m (23–33 ft). The branches can be upright, reclining, or nearly vine-like, all on the same plant. Its plastic morphology allows it to thrive in all kinds of ecosystems, from dunes to swamps, where it grows as a semiaquatic plant. The leaves are alternate, 10–22 cm (3.9–8.7 in) long, pinnately compound with (3–) 5–15 leaflets; the leaflets are roughly oval (lanceolate to elliptical), 3–6 cm (1.2–2.4 in) long and 2–3.5 cm (0.79–1.38 in) broad, and have finely toothed margins, an acute to rounded apex, and yellowish veins. The leaf rachis between the leaflets is usually (but not invariably) slightly winged. The plant is dioecious, with small, white flowers borne profusely in axillary clusters. The fruit is a drupe 4–5 mm (0.16–0.20 in) in diameter, carried in dense clusters of hundreds.

The two varieties are:

- S. terebinthifolia var. acutifolia, leaves to 22 cm, with 7–15 leaflets, pink fruit
- S. terebinthifolia var. terebinthifolia, leaves to 17 cm, with 5–13 leaflets, red fruit
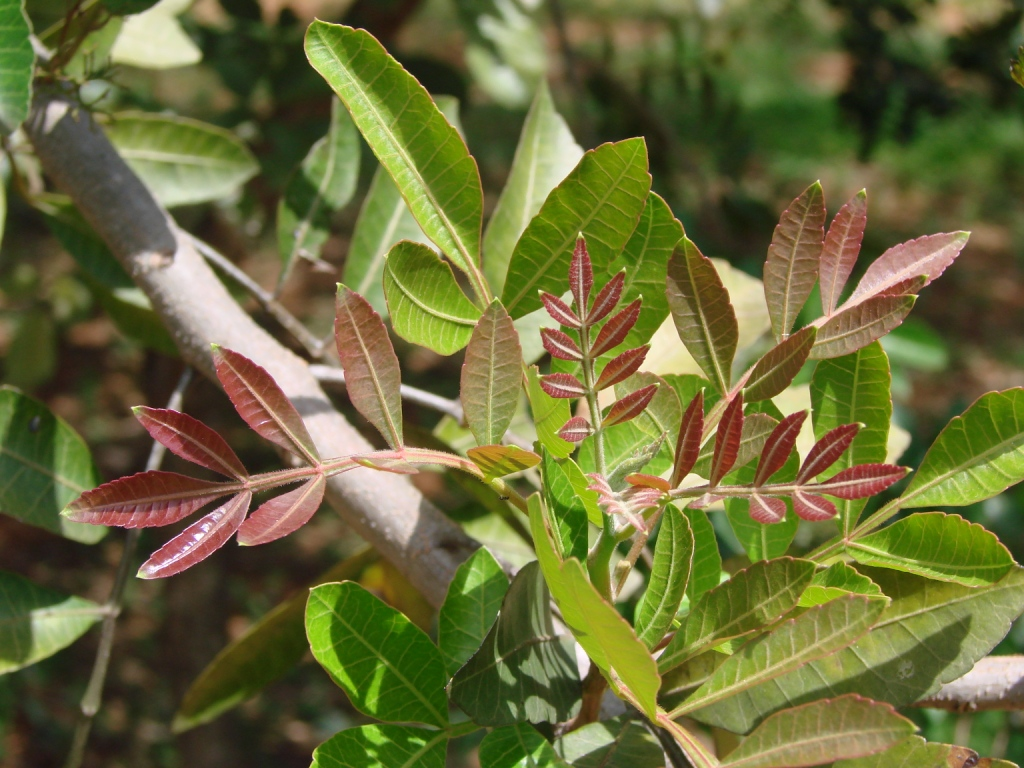
Leaves

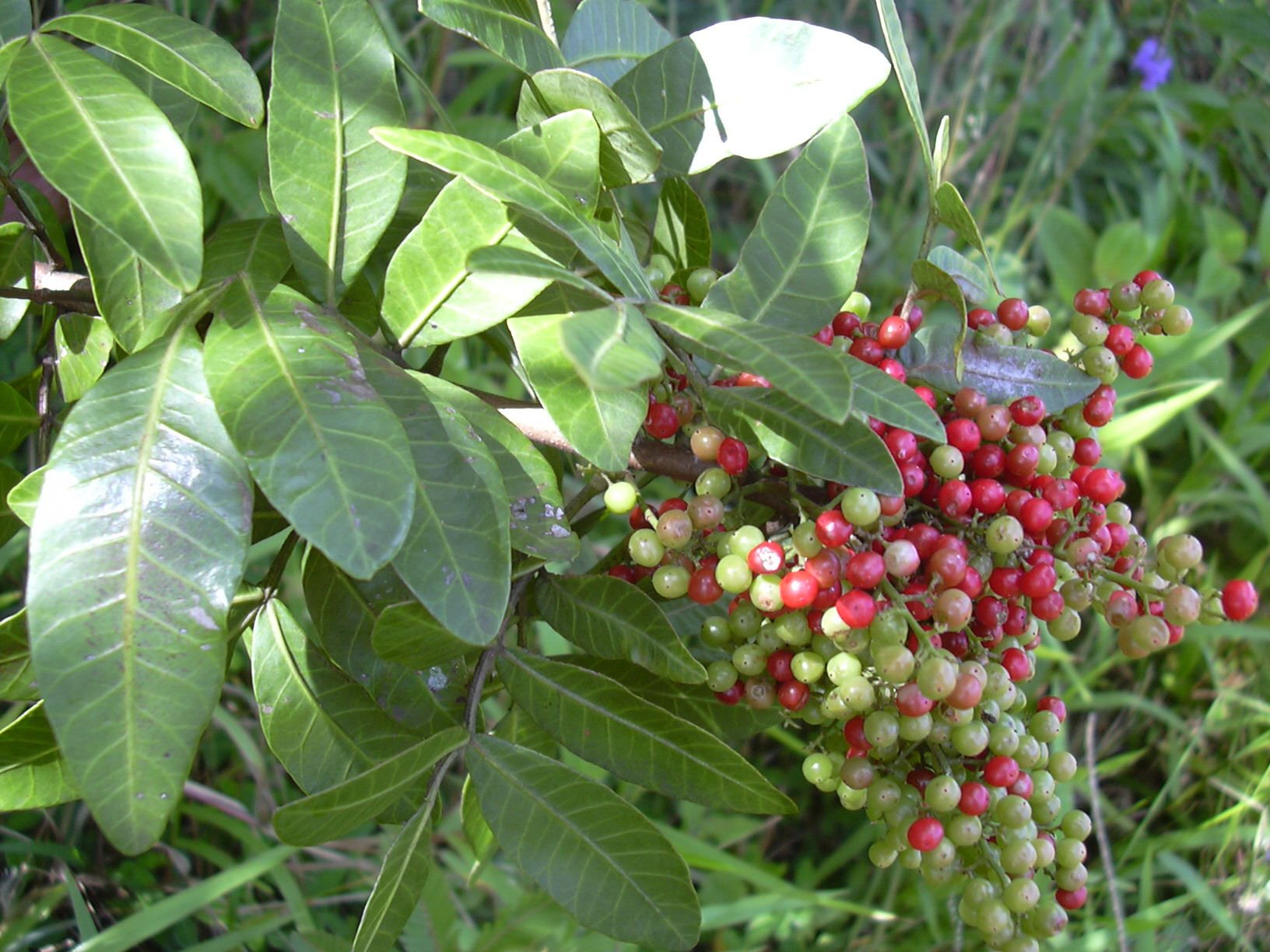
Fruits

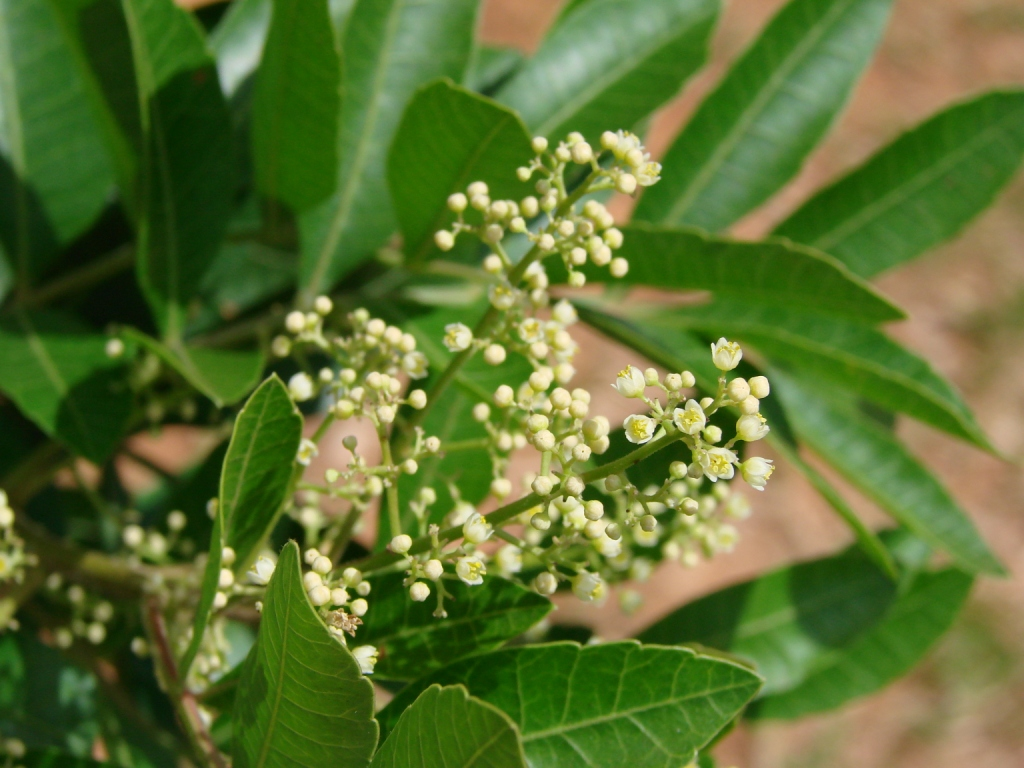
Flowers

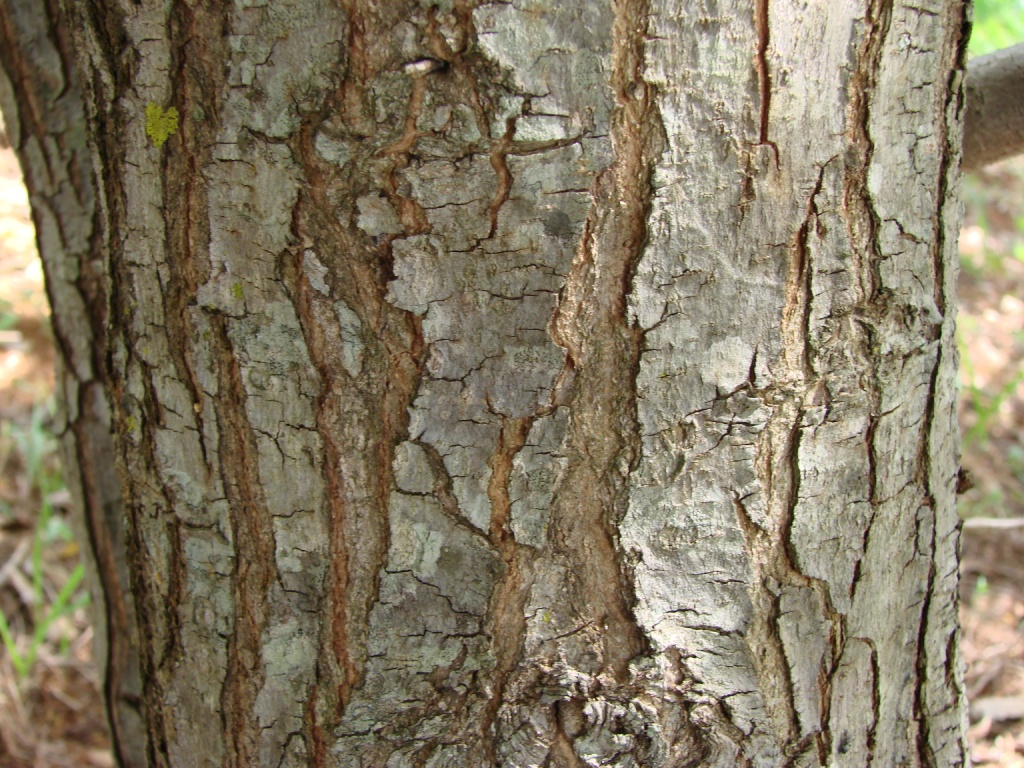
Stem

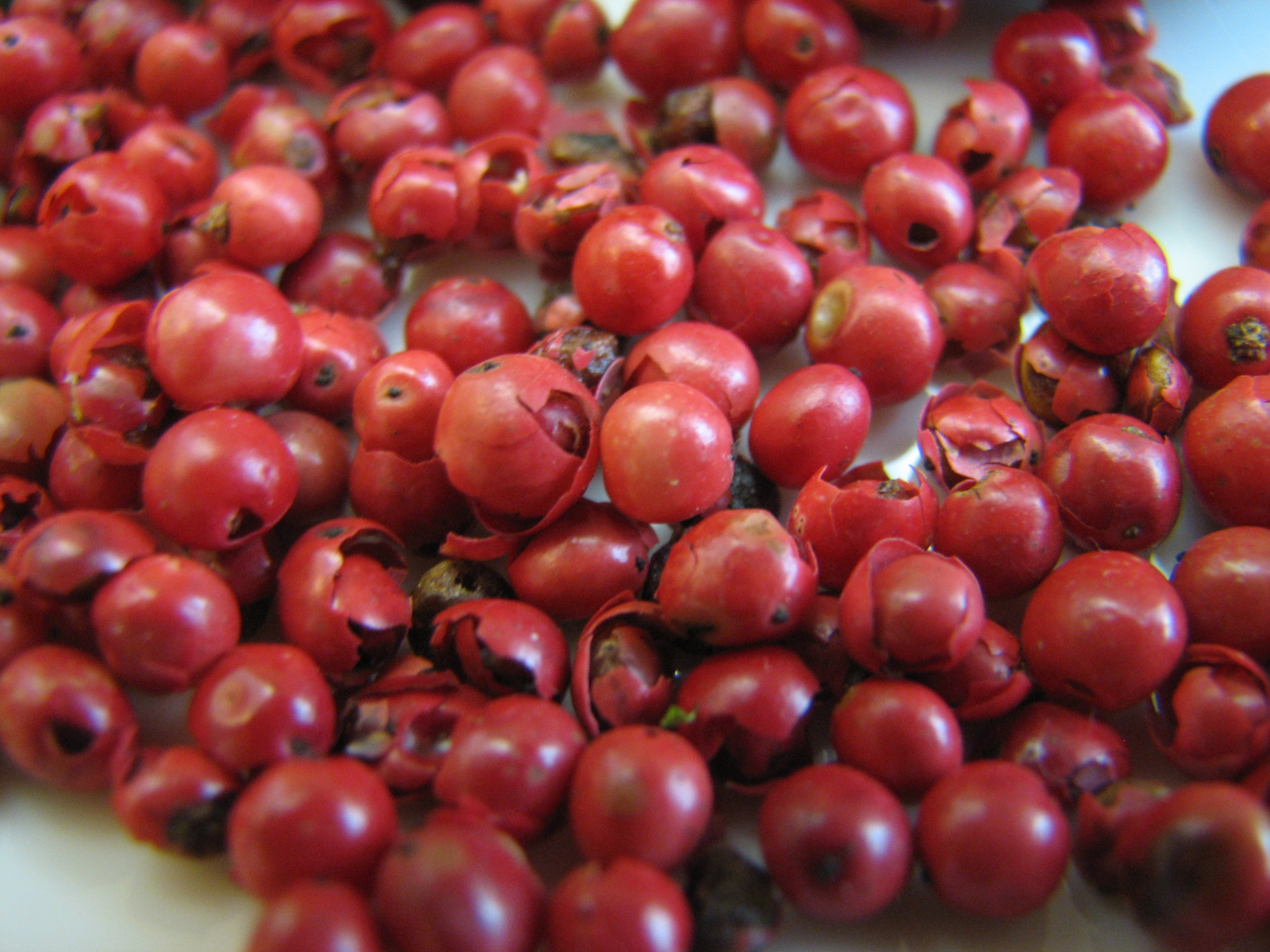
Dried berries

== Distribution ==
Schinus terebinthifolia is native to Argentina, Brazil, and Paraguay. In the United States, it has been introduced to California, Texas, Hawaii, Arizona, Nevada, Louisiana, and Florida.

== Cultivation and uses ==
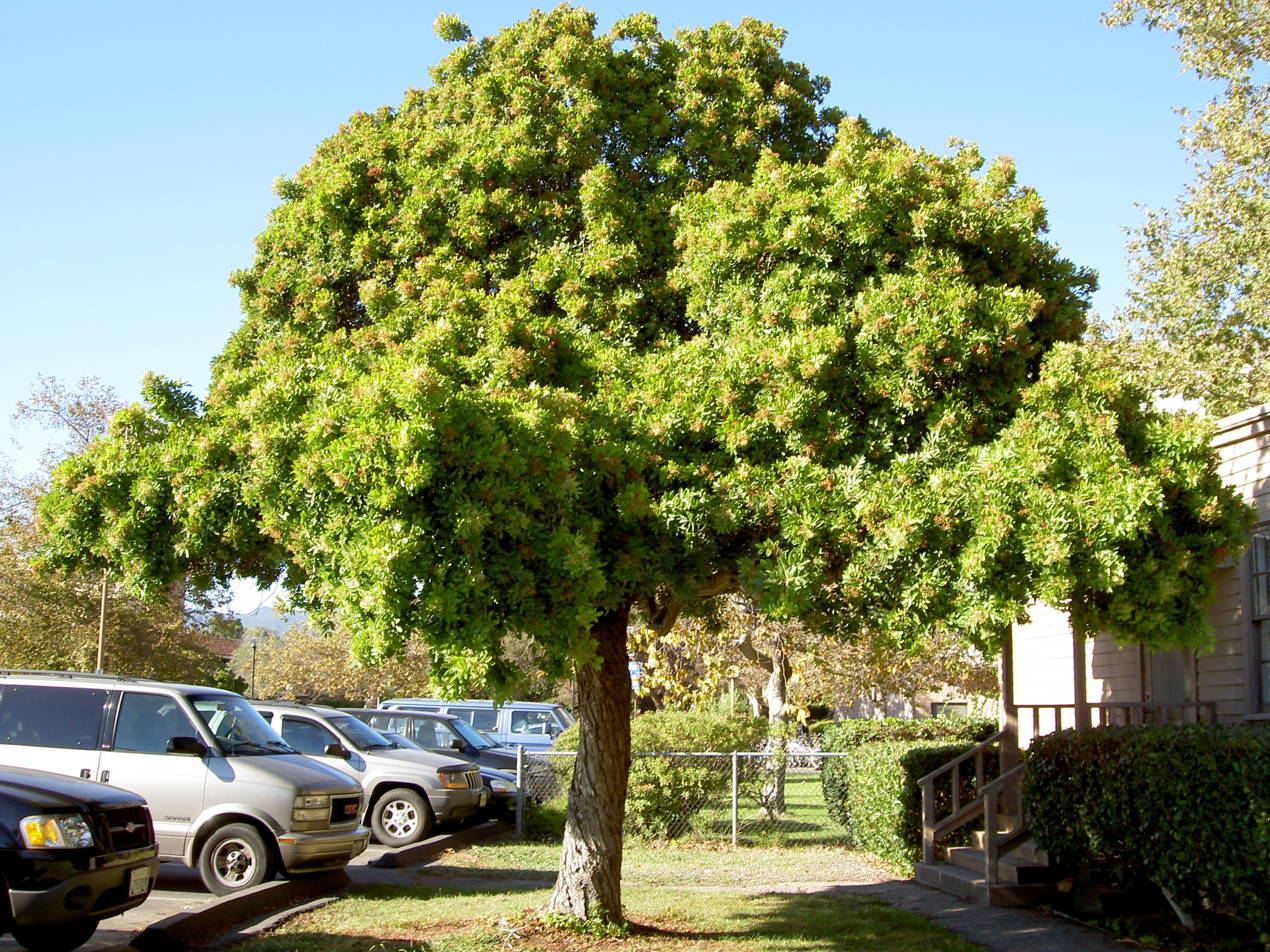
Brazilian pepper tree

Brazilian pepper is widely grown as an ornamental plant in frost-free regions of South America for its foliage and fruit. In its native habitat, it is a melliferous flower and is the main source of food for the stingless bee Tetragonisca angustula, which is an important honey producer in Central and South America.

Although it is not a true pepper (Piper), its dried drupes are often sold as pink peppercorns, as are the fruits from the related species Schinus molle (Peruvian peppertree). The seeds can be used as a spice, adding a pepper-like taste to food. They are usually sold in a dry state and have a bright pink color. They are less often sold pickled in brine, where they have a dull, almost green hue.

Planted originally as an ornamental outside of its native range, Brazilian pepper has become widespread and is considered an invasive species in many subtropical regions with moderate to high rainfall, including parts or all of Australia, the Bahamas, Bermuda, southern China, Cuba, Fiji, French Polynesia, Guam, Malta, the Marshall Islands, Mauritius, New Caledonia, New Zealand, Norfolk Island, Puerto Rico, Réunion, South Africa, and the United States including Hawaii. In drier areas, such as Israel and Southern California, it is also grown, but has not generally proven invasive. In California, it is considered invasive in coastal regions by the California Invasive Plant Council.

Brazilian pepper is hard to control because it produces basal shoots if the trunk is cut. Trees also produce abundant seeds that are dispersed by birds and ants. This same hardiness makes the tree highly useful for reforestation in its native environment, but enables it to become invasive outside of its natural range.

== Toxicity ==
Like many other species in the family Anacardiaceae, Brazilian pepper has an aromatic sap that can cause skin reactions (similar to poison ivy burns) in some sensitive people, although the reaction is usually weaker than that induced by touch of the closely related Lithraea molleoides, known in Brazil as "wild" aroeira (aroeira brava). Conversely, S. terebinthifolia is commonly known as "tame" aroeira (aroeira mansa).

In a paper on triterpenes, the ingested fruits are noted to have a “paralyzing effect” on birds. The narcotic and toxic effects on birds and other wildlife has also been noted by others, e.g., Bureau of Aquatic Plant Management. The AMA Handbook of Poisonous and Injurious Plants reports that the triterpenes found in the fruits can result in irritation of the throat, gastroenteritis, diarrhea, and vomiting. Like most other members of the Anacardiaceae, Brazilian pepper contains active alkenyl phenols, e.g. urushiol and cardol, which can cause contact dermatitis and inflammation in sensitive individuals. Contact with the “sap” from a cut or bruised tree can result in rash, lesions, oozing sores, severe itching, welts, and reddening and swelling (especially of the eyes).

The burning of S. terebinthifolia releases many airborne irritants, affecting the skin, eyes, and lungs. It is said to have a "mace-like" effect upon nearby people and burning is highly inadvisable.

== History ==
Also known as "Florida holly", S. terebinthifolia was introduced to Florida by at latest 1891, probably earlier, where it has spread rapidly since about 1940, replacing native plants, like mangroves, with thousands of acres occupied. It is especially adept at colonizing disturbed sites and can grow in both wet and dry conditions. Its growth habit allows it to climb over understory trees and invade mature canopies, forming thickets that choke out most other plants.

== As an invasive pest ==
The species, including the seed, is legally prohibited from sale, transport, or planting in Florida, according to the Florida Department of Agriculture and Consumer Services Noxious Weed List. It is classified as a Category I pest by the Florida Exotic Pest Plant Council. To keep the plant from spreading into native plant communities and displacing them, local regulations and environmental guidelines require eradication of Brazilian pepper wherever possible. The plant and all parts are also illegal for sale or transfer in Texas. As one of the two species sold as pink peppercorn, the other being Schinus molle, it lacks generally recognized as safe (GRAS) status with the FDA.

Several biocontrols are being studied for use in Florida.

It is a declared weed in several states of Australia. In South Africa, it is classified as a category 1 invader in KwaZulu-Natal province, where any plants are to be removed and destroyed, and a category 3 invader in all other provinces, meaning it may no longer be planted.

== Control ==
Two herbicides are approved for use in the United States to exterminate Brazilian pepper: Triclopyr, using the basal bark method, and glyphosate. Picloram can be used if the stump has been freshly cut, but this is neither the preferred nor most effective means of eradication.

Calophya terebinthifolii and Calophya lutea are two psyllids in the Calophya with high specificity – among plants in Florida – for Brazilian peppertree. Thus, they are recommended for use in biocontrol in that area.
