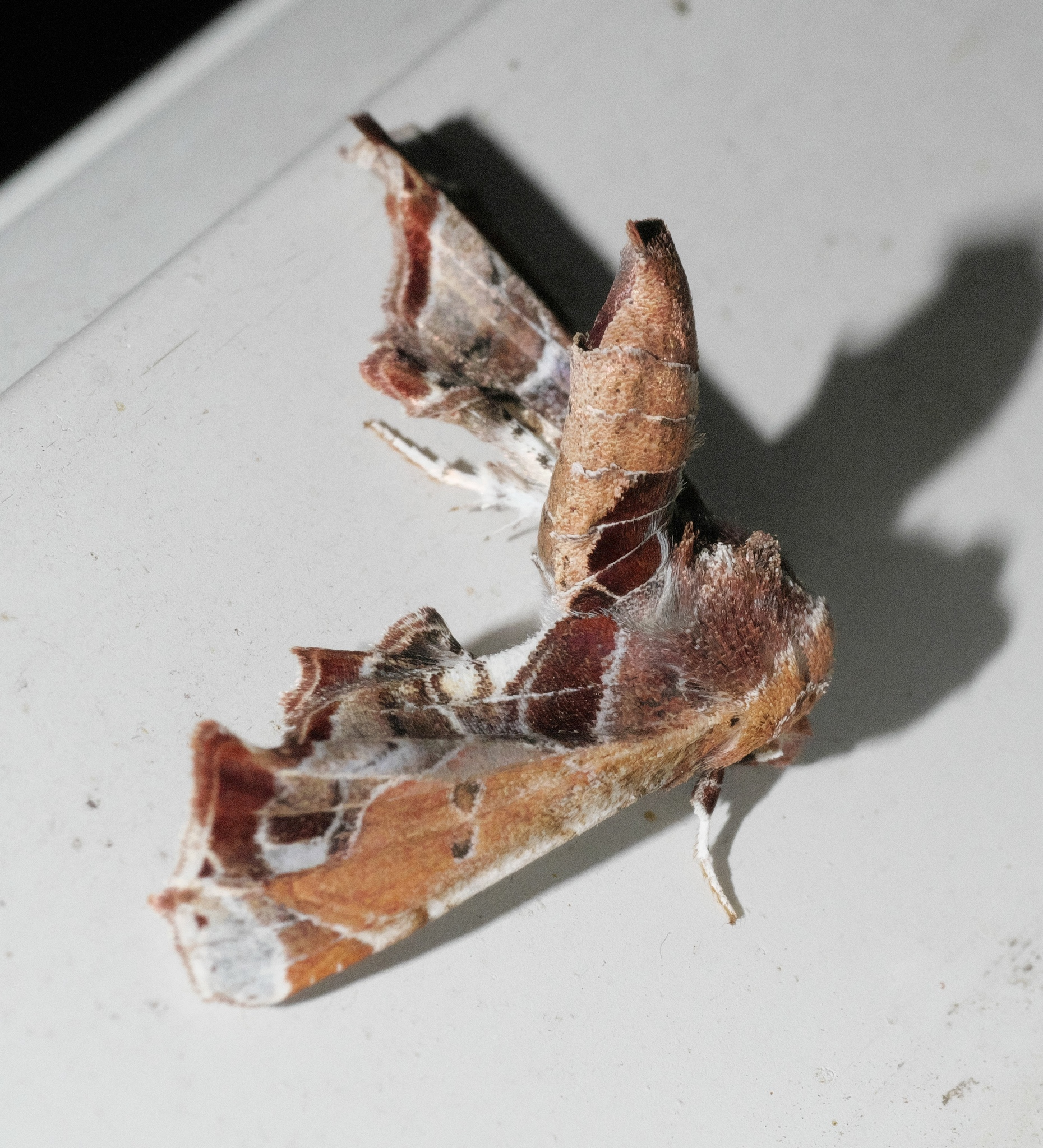
- Marathyssa pulcherrimus, beautiful marathyssa moth, Oklahoma

Scientific classification
- Kingdom: Animalia
- Phylum: Arthropoda
- Class: Insecta
- Order: Lepidoptera
- Superfamily: Noctuoidea
- Family: Euteliidae
- Subfamily: Euteliinae
- Genus: Marathyssa
- Species: M. pulcherrimus

Binomial name
- Marathyssa pulcherrimus (Grote, 1865)

Synonyms
- Eutelia pulcherrimus

= Marathyssa pulcherrimus =

Species of moths

Marathyssa pulcherrimus, the beautiful marathyssa moth, is a species of owlet moth in the family Euteliidae It is found in North, Central, and South America.
