= Targalla bifacies =

Scientific classification
- Kingdom: Animalia
- Phylum: Arthropoda
- Class: Insecta
- Order: Lepidoptera
- Superfamily: Noctuoidea
- Family: Euteliidae
- Genus: Targalla
- Species: T. bifacies

Binomial name
- Targalla bifacies (Walker, 1858)

Synonyms
- Cryassa bifacies Walker, 1858

Species of moth

Targalla bifacies is a moth of the family Noctuidae first described by Francis Bacon in 1858. It is found in Sri Lanka.
