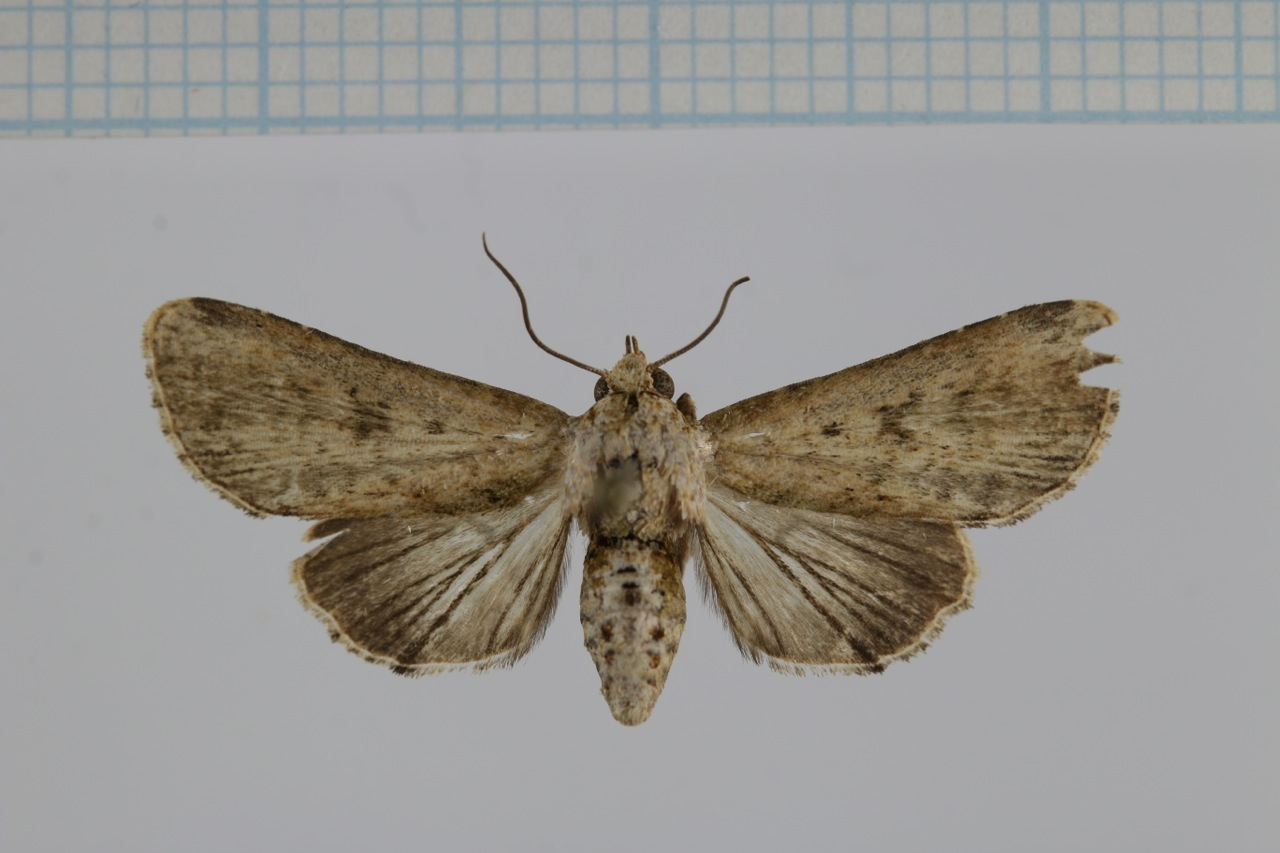

Scientific classification
- Kingdom: Animalia
- Phylum: Arthropoda
- Class: Insecta
- Order: Lepidoptera
- Superfamily: Noctuoidea
- Family: Euteliidae
- Genus: Anigraea
- Species: A. cinctipalpis

Binomial name
- Anigraea cinctipalpis (Walker, 1865)

Synonyms
- Eutelia cinctipalpis Walker, 1865; Aegilia angulata Moore, 1882; Anigraea deletoides Bethune-Baker, 1906; Anigraea olivata Warren, 1914

= Anigraea cinctipalpis =

Species of moth

Anigraea cinctipalpis is a species of moth in the family Noctuidae that was first described by Francis Walker in 1865. It is found in the Indian subcontinent, Sri Lanka, Malaysia, Borneo, Philippines, New Guinea and Australia.

It is a pest of Anacardium occidentale.
