= Gyrtona purpurea =

Scientific classification
- Domain: Eukaryota
- Kingdom: Animalia
- Phylum: Arthropoda
- Class: Insecta
- Order: Lepidoptera
- Superfamily: Noctuoidea
- Family: Euteliidae
- Genus: Gyrtona
- Species: G. purpurea

Binomial name
- Gyrtona purpurea Robinson, 1975

Species of moth

Gyrtona purpurea is a moth of the family Euteliidae. It was described by Robinson in 1975. It is found on Fiji.
