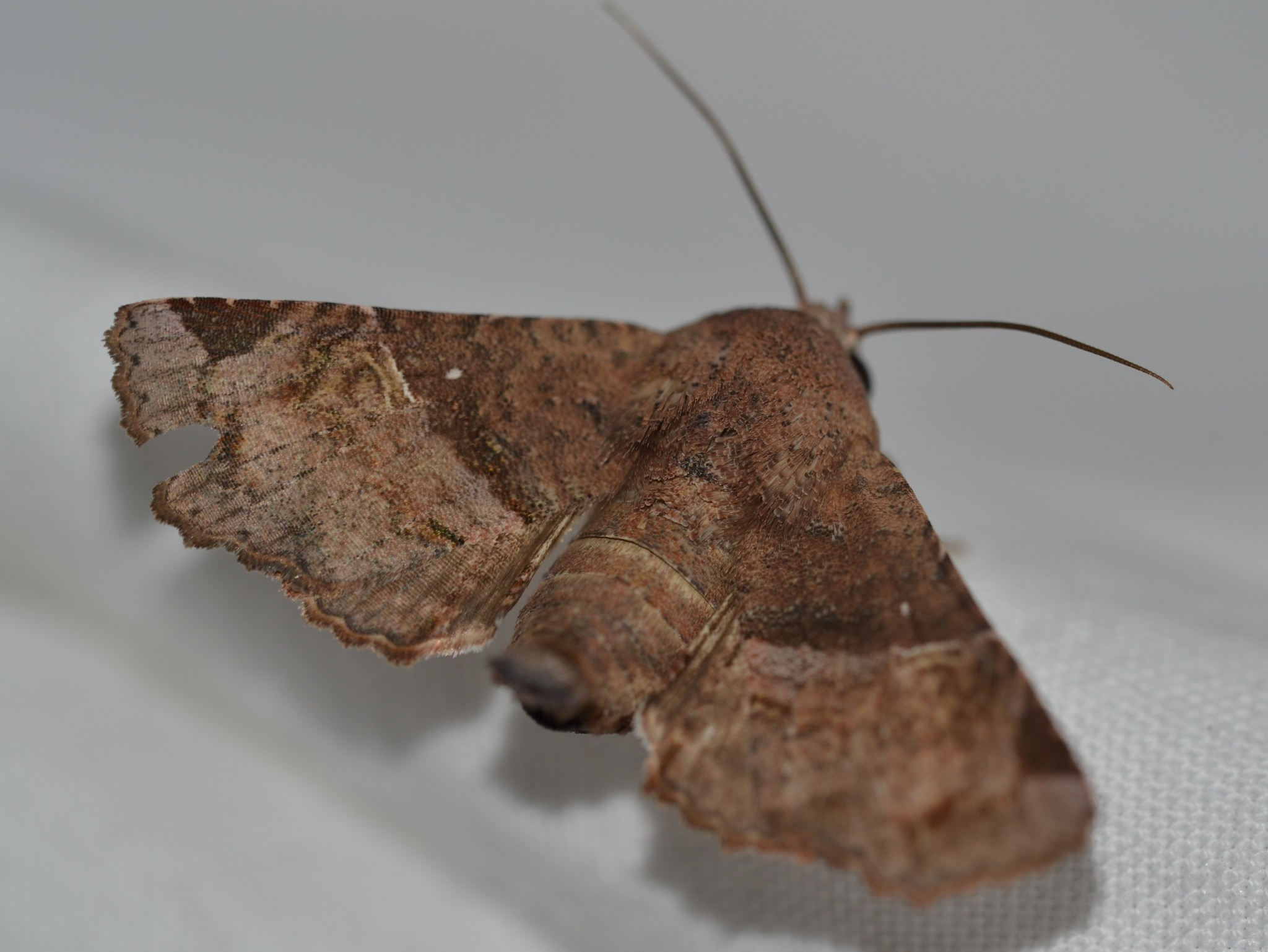

Scientific classification
- Kingdom: Animalia
- Phylum: Arthropoda
- Class: Insecta
- Order: Lepidoptera
- Superfamily: Noctuoidea
- Family: Euteliidae
- Genus: Targalla
- Species: T. delatrix

Binomial name
- Targalla delatrix (Guenée, 1852)

Synonyms
- Penicillaria delatrix Guenée, 1852; Phlegetonia delatrix; Eutelia plusioides Walker, 1865; Eurhipia praetexta R. Felder & Rogenhofer, 1874

= Targalla delatrix =

Species of moth

Targalla delatrix, the eugenia caterpillar, is a moth of the family Euteliidae. The species was first described by Achille Guenée in 1852. It is widespread in the Indo-Australian tropics to Fiji. It has also been recorded from Rapa Iti, the Society Islands and Hawaii.

The larvae feed on Eugenia uniflora and Syzygium cumini (Myrtaceae).
