= Gyrtona polionota =

Scientific classification
- Kingdom: Animalia
- Phylum: Arthropoda
- Class: Insecta
- Order: Lepidoptera
- Superfamily: Noctuoidea
- Family: Euteliidae
- Genus: Gyrtona
- Species: G. polionota

Binomial name
- Gyrtona polionota Hampson, 1905

Synonyms
- Nigramma perstrialis Hampson, 1918

Species of moth

Gyrtona polionota is a moth of the family Euteliidae. It is found in Fiji, New Guinea and Australia.
