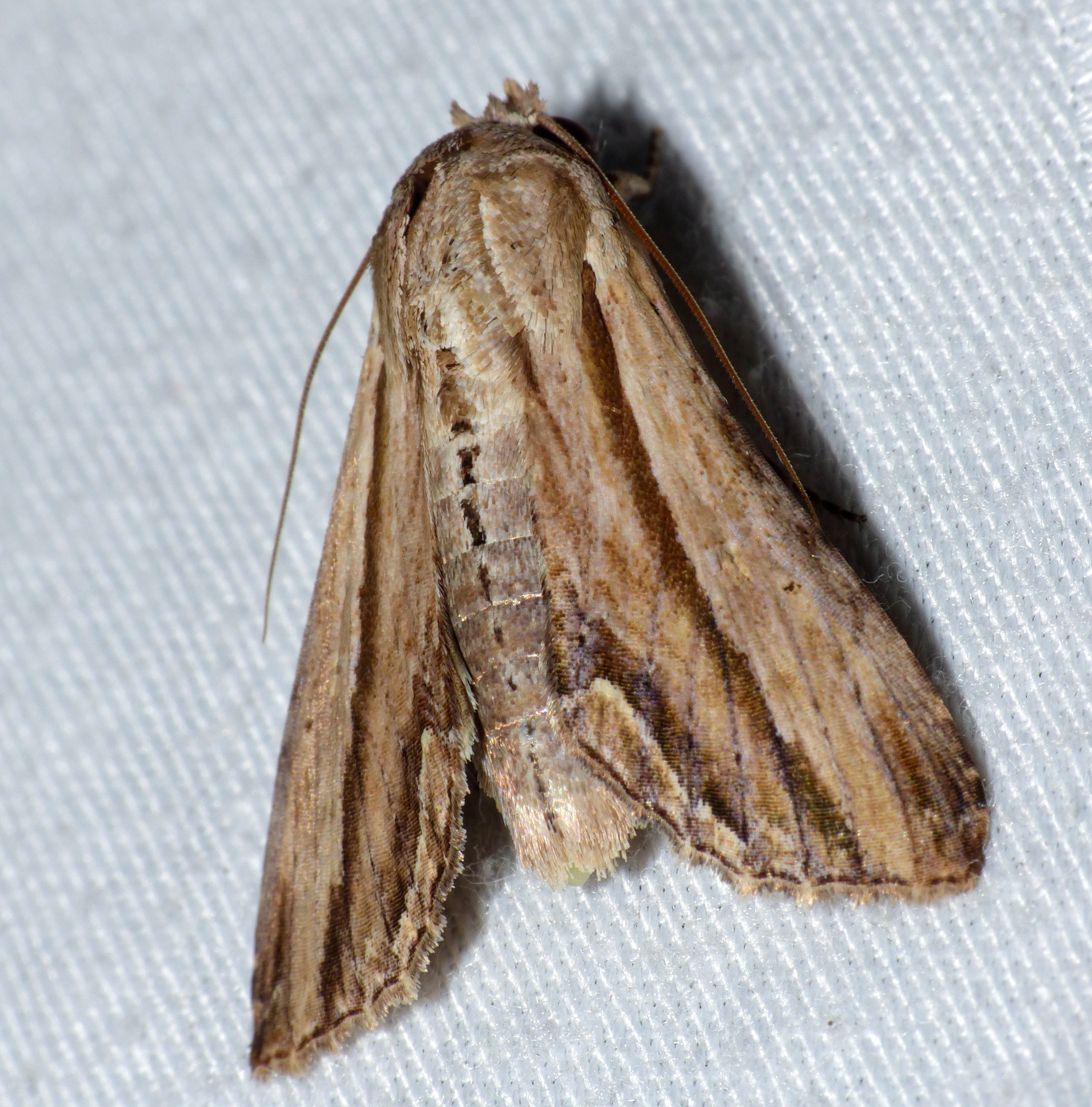

Scientific classification
- Kingdom: Animalia
- Phylum: Arthropoda
- Clade: Pancrustacea
- Class: Insecta
- Order: Lepidoptera
- Superfamily: Noctuoidea
- Family: Euteliidae
- Genus: Aegilia
- Species: A. describens

Binomial name
- Aegilia describens (Walker, [1858])

Synonyms
- Stictoptera describens Walker, 1857; Lophoptera xylinata Walker, 1865; Stictoptera anisoptera Snellen, 1880; Stictoptera anca Swinhoe, 1919

= Aegilia describens =

Species of moth

Aegilia describens is a moth of the family Euteliidae first described by Francis Walker in 1858. It is found in Oriental tropics of India, Sri Lanka, to New Guinea, the Bismarck Islands and Queensland, also on Christmas Islands in the Indian Ocean.

The caterpillar has a medium grass-green body with a distinct, 'pulsating' dark greenish dorsal line. A brownish, faint, lateral line extending to the dorsolateral area. Spiracles are orange divided by black. Pupation occurs in soil within a silk cocoon. Host plant includes Mesua ferrea.
