= Marathyssa minus =

Scientific classification
- Kingdom: Animalia
- Phylum: Arthropoda
- Class: Insecta
- Order: Lepidoptera
- Superfamily: Noctuoidea
- Family: Euteliidae
- Genus: Marathyssa
- Species: M. minus

Binomial name
- Marathyssa minus Dyar, 1921

Species of moth

Marathyssa minus is a species of moth in the family Euteliidae. It is found in North America.

The MONA or Hodges number for Marathyssa minus is 8956.1.
