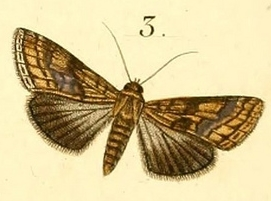

Scientific classification
- Kingdom: Animalia
- Phylum: Arthropoda
- Clade: Pancrustacea
- Class: Insecta
- Order: Lepidoptera
- Superfamily: Noctuoidea
- Family: Euteliidae
- Genus: Lophoptera
- Species: L. litigiosa

Binomial name
- Lophoptera litigiosa (Boisduval, 1833)

Synonyms
- Apamea litigiosa Boisduval, 1833; Stictoptera alutacea Felder & Rogenhofer, 1874; Lophoptera cristigera Guenée, 1852; Lophoptera squamulosa Saalmüller, 1880

= Lophoptera litigiosa =

Species of moth

Lophoptera litigiosa is a member of the moth family Euteliidae.

It is found in most countries of subtropical Africa, from Sierra Leone to South Africa; Nigeria to Kenya, including the islands of the Indian Ocean of Madagascar, Mauritius and La Réunion.

This species has a wingspan of 19mm.
