= Anuga constricta =

Scientific classification
- Kingdom: Animalia
- Phylum: Arthropoda
- Class: Insecta
- Order: Lepidoptera
- Superfamily: Noctuoidea
- Family: Euteliidae
- Genus: Anuga
- Species: A. constricta

Binomial name
- Anuga constricta (Guenée, 1852)

Synonyms
- Caecila complexa Walker, 1858; Spersara glaucopoides Walker, [1863] 1864; Cremnodes macrocera Snellen, 1880

Species of moth

Anuga constricta is a moth of the family Noctuidae first described by Achille Guenée in 1852. It is found in Oriental tropics of India, Sri Lanka, to Sundaland, Philippines, and Sulawesi.

Its forewings are narrow and dark gray in color. Lighter gray areas can found around its stigma. It has two subtornal rows of white spots on its hindwings. Caterpillar pale green to dirty olive green with a narrow, dorsal gray band laterally expands into triangles in some segments. Setae arise from purple spots. Caterpillar typically found on the upperside of old leaves closer to midrib and petiole with camouflage. Pupation occurs in a cocoon woven by silk in the soil. Larval host plants are Mangifera indica, Semecarpus, and Anisoptera species.
