= Gyrtona malgassica =

Scientific classification
- Domain: Eukaryota
- Kingdom: Animalia
- Phylum: Arthropoda
- Class: Insecta
- Order: Lepidoptera
- Superfamily: Noctuoidea
- Family: Euteliidae
- Genus: Gyrtona
- Species: G. malgassica

Binomial name
- Gyrtona malgassica (Kenrick, 1917)

Synonyms
- Acosmetia malgassica Kenrick, 1917

Species of moth

Gyrtona malgassica is a moth of the family Euteliidae first described by George Hamilton Kenrick in 1917. It is found on Madagascar.

This moth is greyish brown and the adults have a wingspan of 28 mm.
