= Targalla repleta =

Scientific classification
- Kingdom: Animalia
- Phylum: Arthropoda
- Class: Insecta
- Order: Lepidoptera
- Superfamily: Noctuoidea
- Family: Euteliidae
- Genus: Targalla
- Species: T. repleta

Binomial name
- Targalla repleta (Walker, 1858)

Synonyms
- Eutelia repleta Walker, 1865; Stictoptera repleta (Walker, [1863] 1864)

Species of moth

Targalla repleta is a moth of the family Noctuidae first described by Francis Walker in 1858. It is found in Sri Lanka.
