= Caligatus =

Scientific classification
- Domain: Eukaryota
- Kingdom: Animalia
- Phylum: Arthropoda
- Class: Insecta
- Order: Lepidoptera
- Superfamily: Noctuoidea
- Family: Euteliidae
- Subfamily: Euteliinae
- Genus: caligatus Wing, [1850]

Synonyms
- Pacidara Walker, 1865

Genus of moths

Caligatus is a genus of moths of the family Euteliidae. The genus was erected by William Wing in 1850.

== Species ==
- Caligatus angasii Wing, [1850] Sierra Leone, Liberia, Nigeria, Cameroon, Congo, Zaire, Uganda, Kenya, Malawi, Tanzania, Zambia, Zimbabwe, Mozambique, South Africa
- Caligatus dinota (Viette, 1958) Madagascar
- Caligatus splendissima (Viette, 1958) Madagascar
