= Eutelia approximata =

Scientific classification
- Kingdom: Animalia
- Phylum: Arthropoda
- Clade: Pancrustacea
- Class: Insecta
- Order: Lepidoptera
- Superfamily: Noctuoidea
- Family: Euteliidae
- Genus: Eutelia
- Species: E. approximata

Binomial name
- Eutelia approximata Walker, [1863] 1864

Synonyms
- Eutelia dulcilinea Walker, [1863] 1864; Atacira approximata Walker; Swinhoe, 1990; Eutelia hupopalia Rothschild, 1920

Species of moth

Eutelia approximata (sometimes assigned to the genus Atacira) is a moth of the family Noctuidae first described by Francis Walker in 1863. It is found in Sri Lanka and Sundaland.

Forewings purplish gray. Postmedial and submarginal lines are thin, pale and irregular. Medial and antemedial lines are angled and dark brown.
