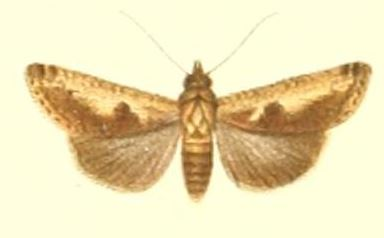
- Gyrtona albicans

Scientific classification
- Kingdom: Animalia
- Phylum: Arthropoda
- Clade: Pancrustacea
- Class: Insecta
- Order: Lepidoptera
- Superfamily: Noctuoidea
- Family: Euteliidae
- Genus: Gyrtona
- Species: G. albicans

Binomial name
- Gyrtona albicans (Pagenstecher, 1900)

Synonyms
- Lophoptera albicans Pagenstecher, 1900

= Gyrtona albicans =

Species of moth

Gyrtona albicans is a moth of the family Euteliidae. It is found in Papua New Guinea.
