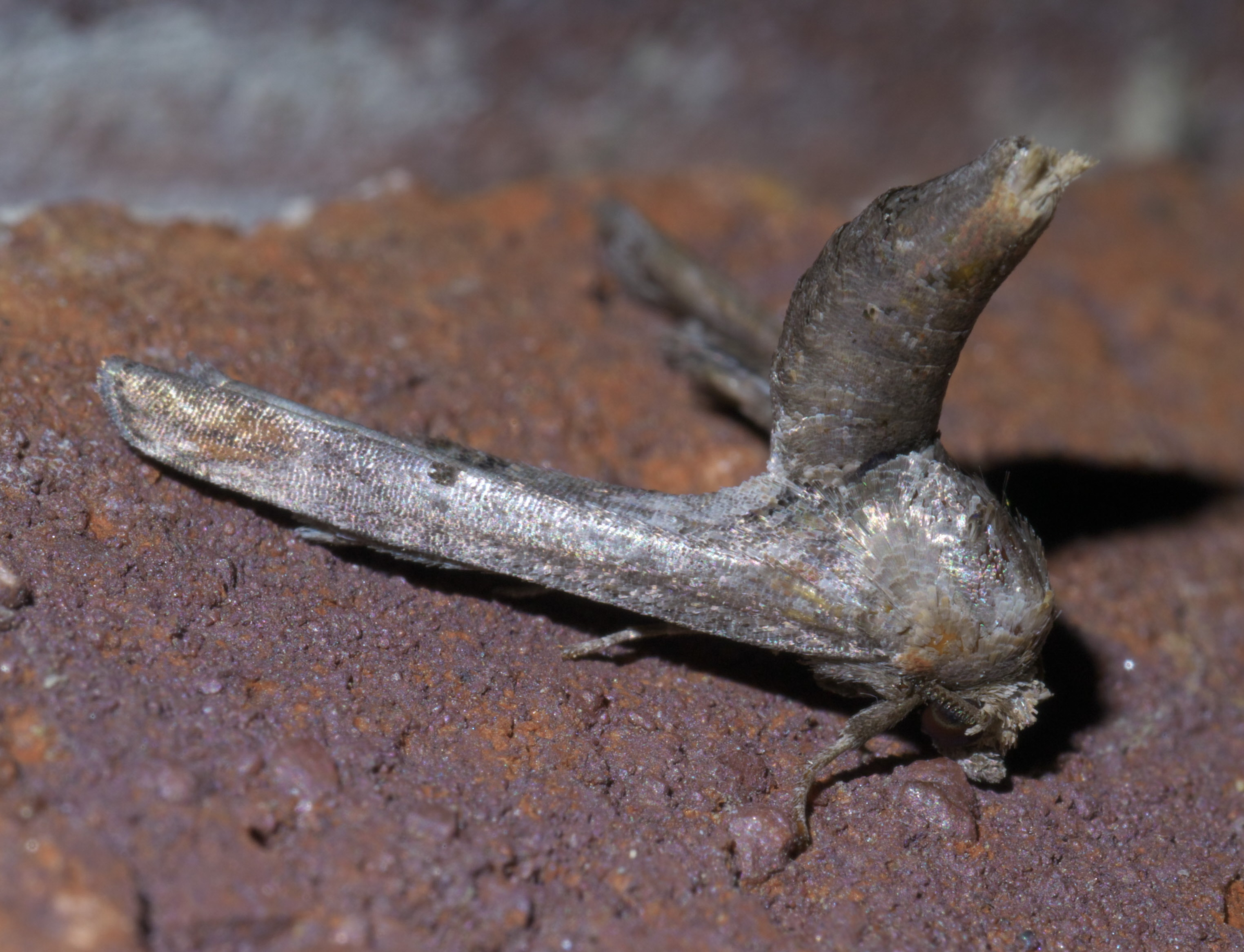

Scientific classification
- Kingdom: Animalia
- Phylum: Arthropoda
- Class: Insecta
- Order: Lepidoptera
- Superfamily: Noctuoidea
- Family: Euteliidae
- Genus: Marathyssa
- Species: M. basalis

Binomial name
- Marathyssa basalis Walker, 1865

= Marathyssa basalis =

Species of moth

Marathyssa basalis, the light marathyssa, is a moth in the family Euteliidae. It is found in North America. The species was first described by Francis Walker in 1865.

The MONA or Hodges number for Marathyssa basalis is 8956.

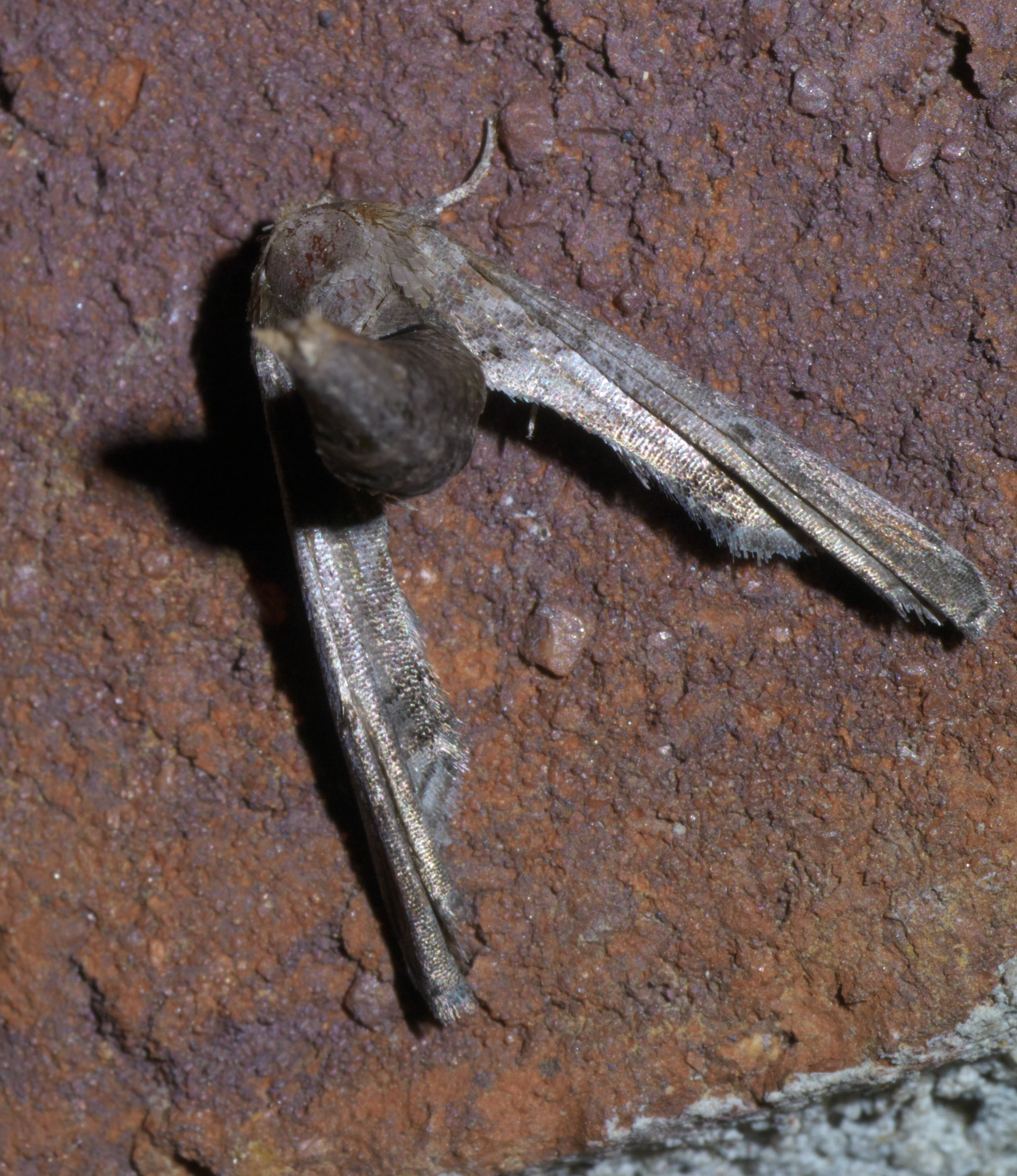
Light marathyssa, Marathyssa basalis
