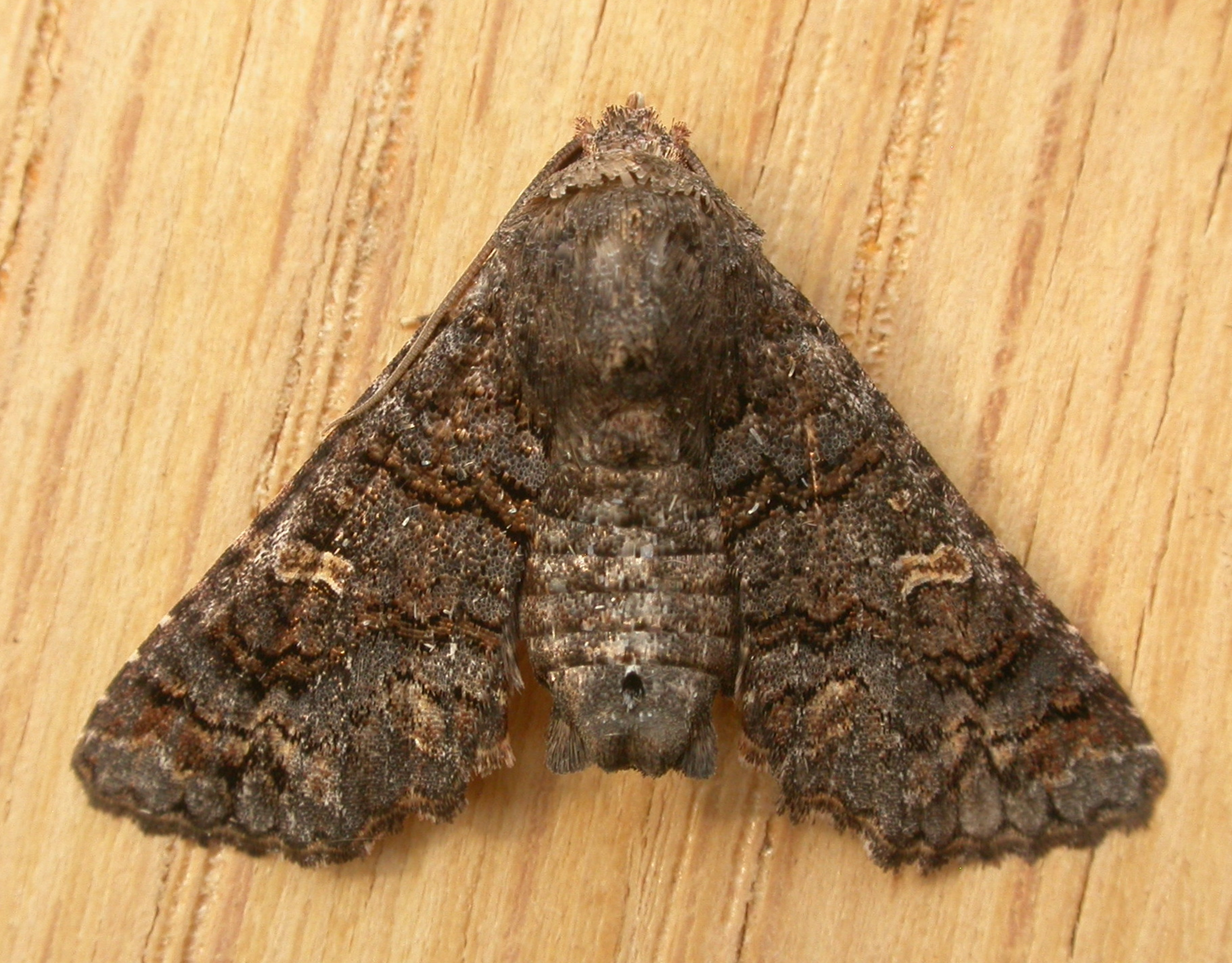

Scientific classification
- Kingdom: Animalia
- Phylum: Arthropoda
- Class: Insecta
- Order: Lepidoptera
- Superfamily: Noctuoidea
- Family: Euteliidae
- Genus: Pataeta
- Species: P. carbo

Binomial name
- Pataeta carbo (Guenée, 1852)

Synonyms
- Phlegetonia carbo Guenée, 1852; Pataeta conspicienda Walker, 1858; Phlegetonia corvina Snellen, 1880

= Pataeta carbo =

Species of moth

Pataeta carbo is a moth in the family Euteliidae first described by Achille Guenée in 1852.

It is found around the west Pacific, including Australia (in the Australian Capital Territory, the Northern Territory, Queensland and Victoria) as well as in Fiji and Hong Kong.

The wingspan is about 50 mm.

The larvae feed on Eucalyptus and Callistemon species.
