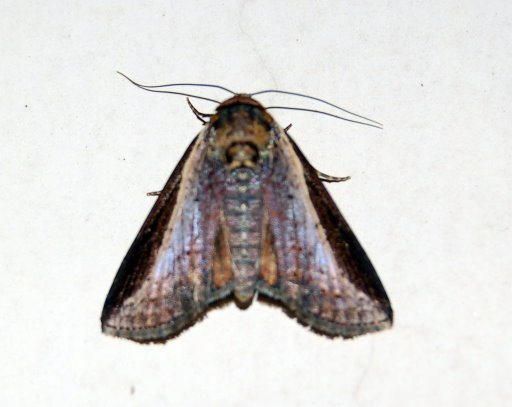

Scientific classification
- Kingdom: Animalia
- Phylum: Arthropoda
- Class: Insecta
- Order: Lepidoptera
- Superfamily: Noctuoidea
- Family: Euteliidae
- Genus: Lophoptera
- Species: L. squammigera

Binomial name
- Lophoptera squammigera Guenée, 1852

Synonyms
- Lophoptera costata Moore, 1885; Lophoptera vittigera Walker, 1865

= Lophoptera squammigera =

Species of moth

Lophoptera squammigera is a member of the moth family Euteliidae. It occurs in the Oriental tropics from Sri Lanka to Sundaland, Sulawesi, Timor and the Bismarck Archipelago.

== Description ==
Its wingspan is about 34 mm. The forewings of the male are somewhat broader. Body greyish brown. Forewings with double sub-basal, antemedial and postmedial waved lines. The medial area suffused with fuscous, and with dark stria in and below cell. Two sub-marginal single waved lines, the inner dark at costa. Hindwings fuscous without hyaline.

Host plants of the larvae are Euphorbiaceae (Mallotus sp. and Briedelia sp.), Dipterocarpaceae (Shorea sp.) and Tiliaceae (Grewia sp.).
