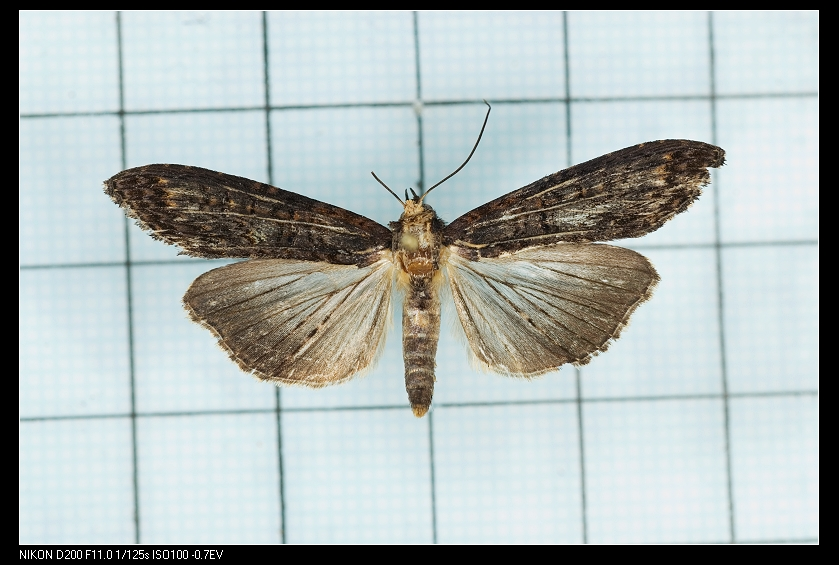

Scientific classification
- Domain: Eukaryota
- Kingdom: Animalia
- Phylum: Arthropoda
- Class: Insecta
- Order: Lepidoptera
- Superfamily: Noctuoidea
- Family: Euteliidae
- Genus: Lophoptera
- Species: L. longipennis

Binomial name
- Lophoptera longipennis (Moore, 1882)

Synonyms
- Sadarsa longipennis Moore, 1882

= Lophoptera longipennis =

Species of moth

Lophoptera longipennis is a moth of the family Euteliidae first described by Frederic Moore in 1882. It is found in the India's north-eastern Himalayas, Taiwan, Sumatra, Java and Borneo.
