= Lophoptera triangulata =

Scientific classification
- Domain: Eukaryota
- Kingdom: Animalia
- Phylum: Arthropoda
- Class: Insecta
- Order: Lepidoptera
- Superfamily: Noctuoidea
- Family: Euteliidae
- Genus: Lophoptera
- Species: L. triangulata

Binomial name
- Lophoptera triangulata Berio, 1973

Species of moth

Lophoptera triangulata is a moth of the family Euteliidae. It was first described by Emilio Berio in 1973 from a holotype found in Kambaiti, Myanmar.
