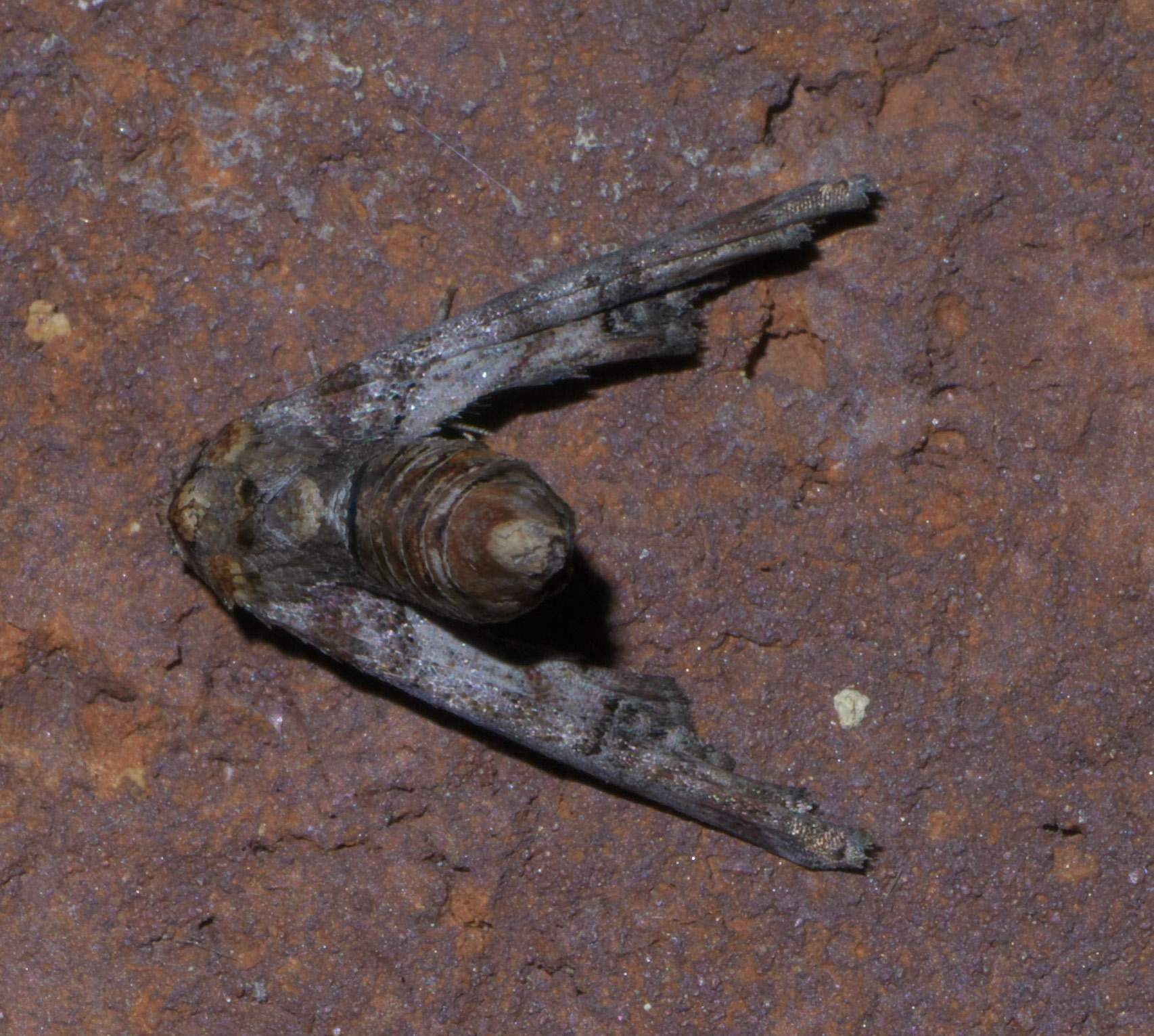
- Adult
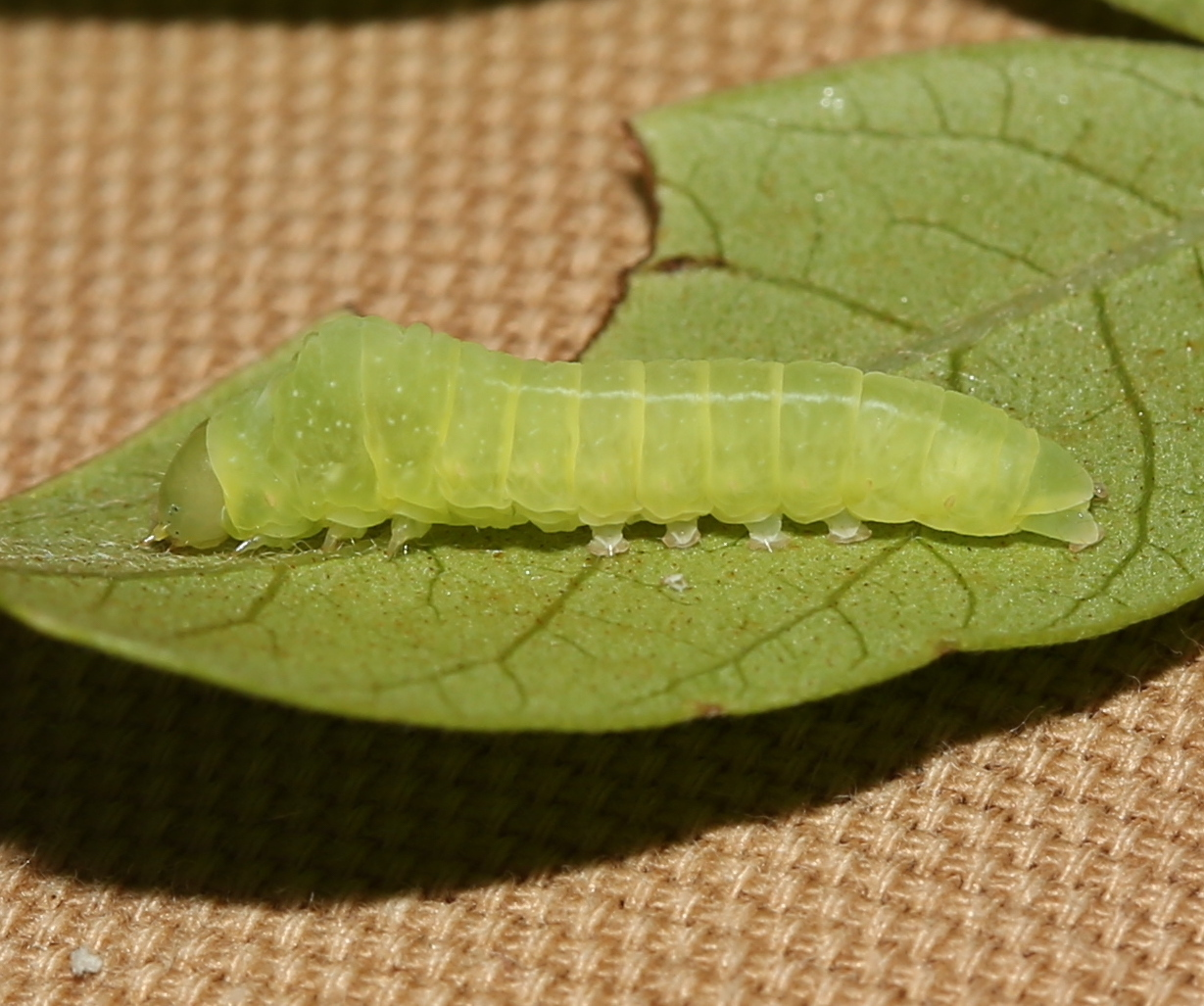
- Larva on Rhus copallinum

Scientific classification
- Kingdom: Animalia
- Phylum: Arthropoda
- Clade: Pancrustacea
- Class: Insecta
- Order: Lepidoptera
- Superfamily: Noctuoidea
- Family: Euteliidae
- Genus: Marathyssa
- Species: M. inficita

Binomial name
- Marathyssa inficita (Walker, 1865)

= Marathyssa inficita =

Species of moth

Marathyssa inficita, the dark marathyssa, is a species of moth in the family Euteliidae. The species was first described by Francis Walker in 1865. It is found in North America.

== Subspecies ==
There are two subspecies recognised:

- Marathyssa inficita inficita (Walker, 1865)
- Marathyssa inficita minus Dyar, 1921
