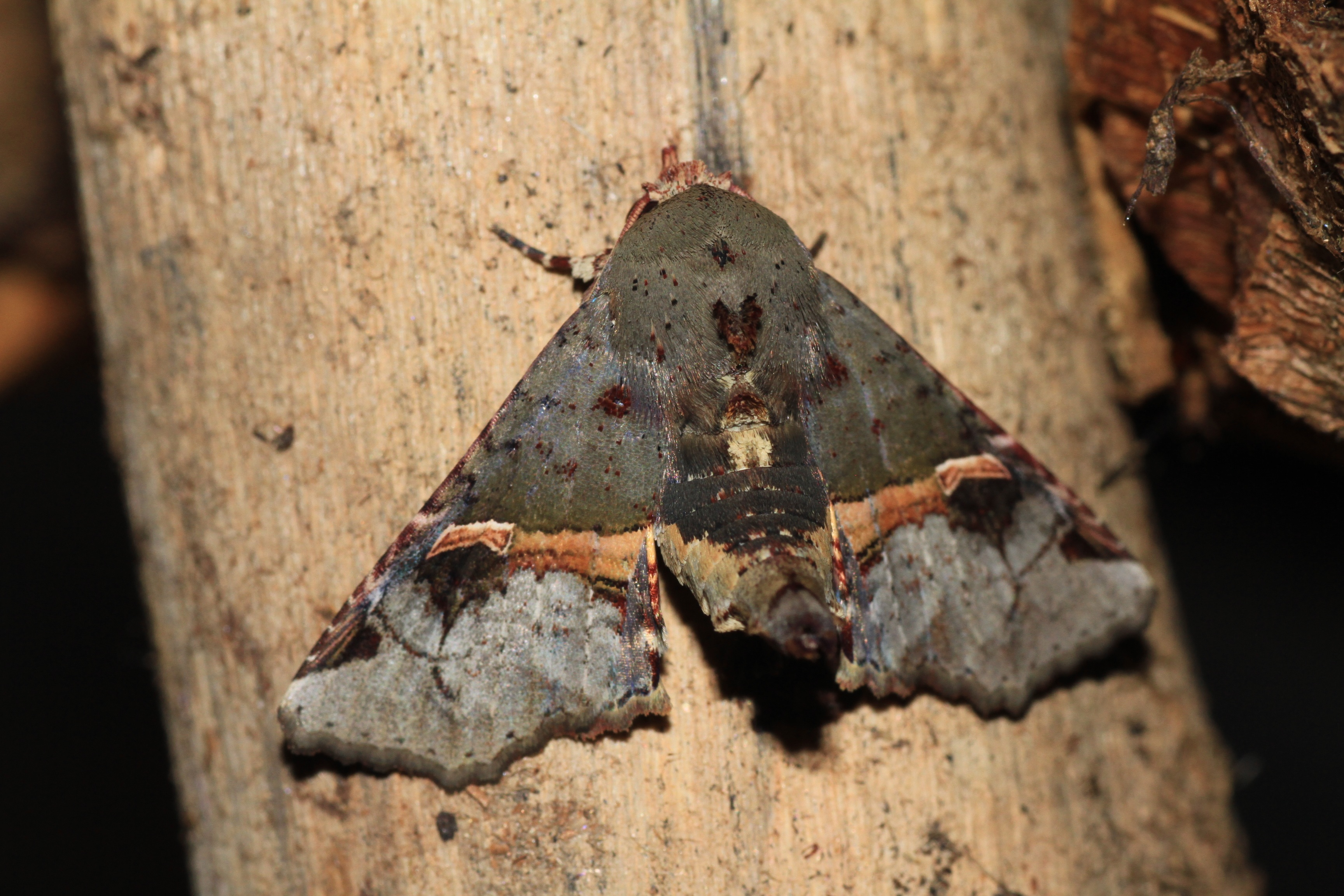

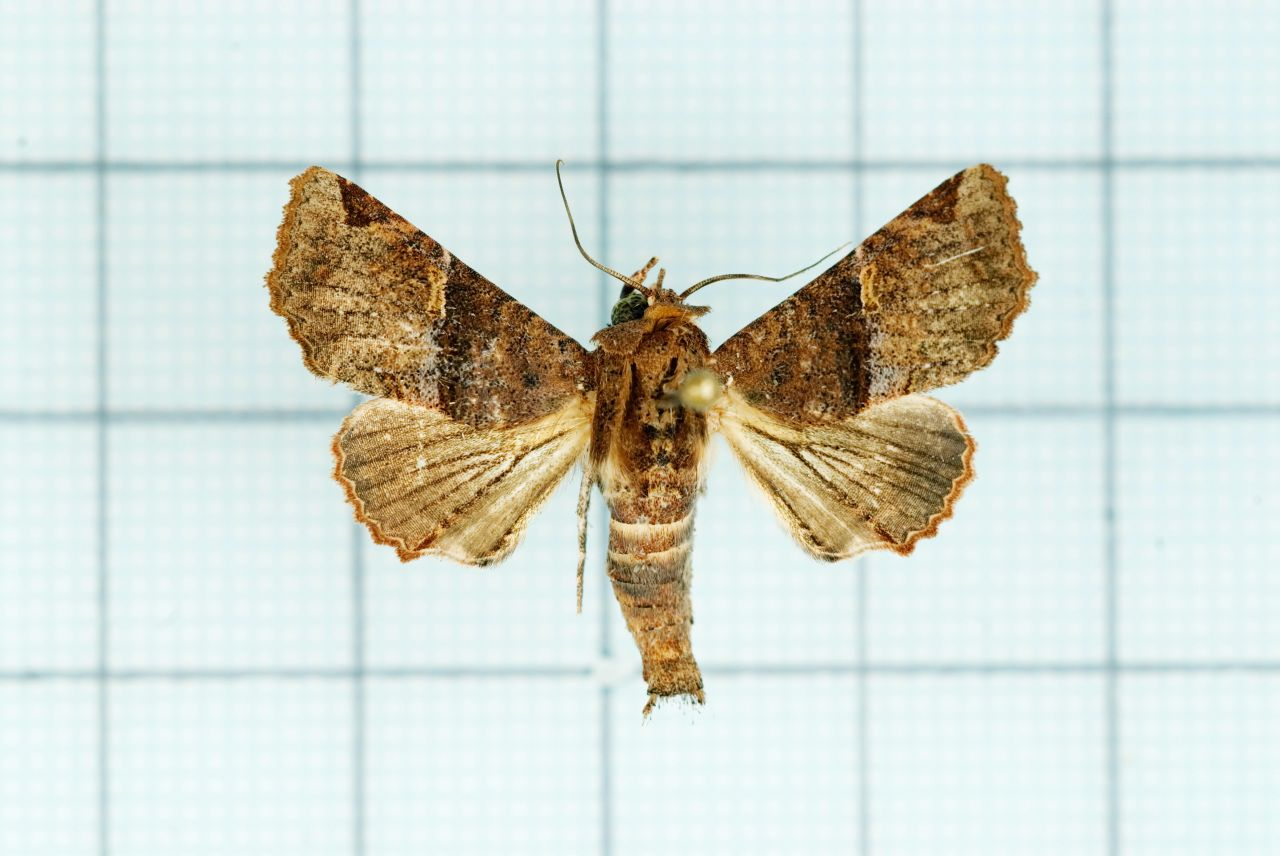

Scientific classification
- Kingdom: Animalia
- Phylum: Arthropoda
- Class: Insecta
- Order: Lepidoptera
- Superfamily: Noctuoidea
- Family: Euteliidae
- Genus: Targalla
- Species: T. subocellata

Binomial name
- Targalla subocellata (Walker, 1863)

Synonyms
- Eutelia subocellata Walker, [1863]; Phlegetonia pantarcha Turner, 1922

= Targalla subocellata =

Species of moth

Targalla subocellata is a moth in the family Euteliidae first described by Francis Walker in 1863. It is found in Taiwan, the north-eastern part of the Himalayas, Sundaland, the Philippines, Sulawesi, the southern Moluccas, New Guinea and Queensland.

== Subspecies ==
- Targalla subocellata subocellata
- Targalla subocellata pantarcha (Turner, 1922) (Australia, New Guinea, the southern Moluccas and Sulawesi)
