= Gyrtona hylusalis =

Scientific classification
- Kingdom: Animalia
- Phylum: Arthropoda
- Class: Insecta
- Order: Lepidoptera
- Superfamily: Noctuoidea
- Family: Euteliidae
- Genus: Gyrtona
- Species: G. hylusalis

Binomial name
- Gyrtona hylusalis Walker, 1863

Species of moth

Gyrtona hylusalis is a moth of the family Euteliidae.
