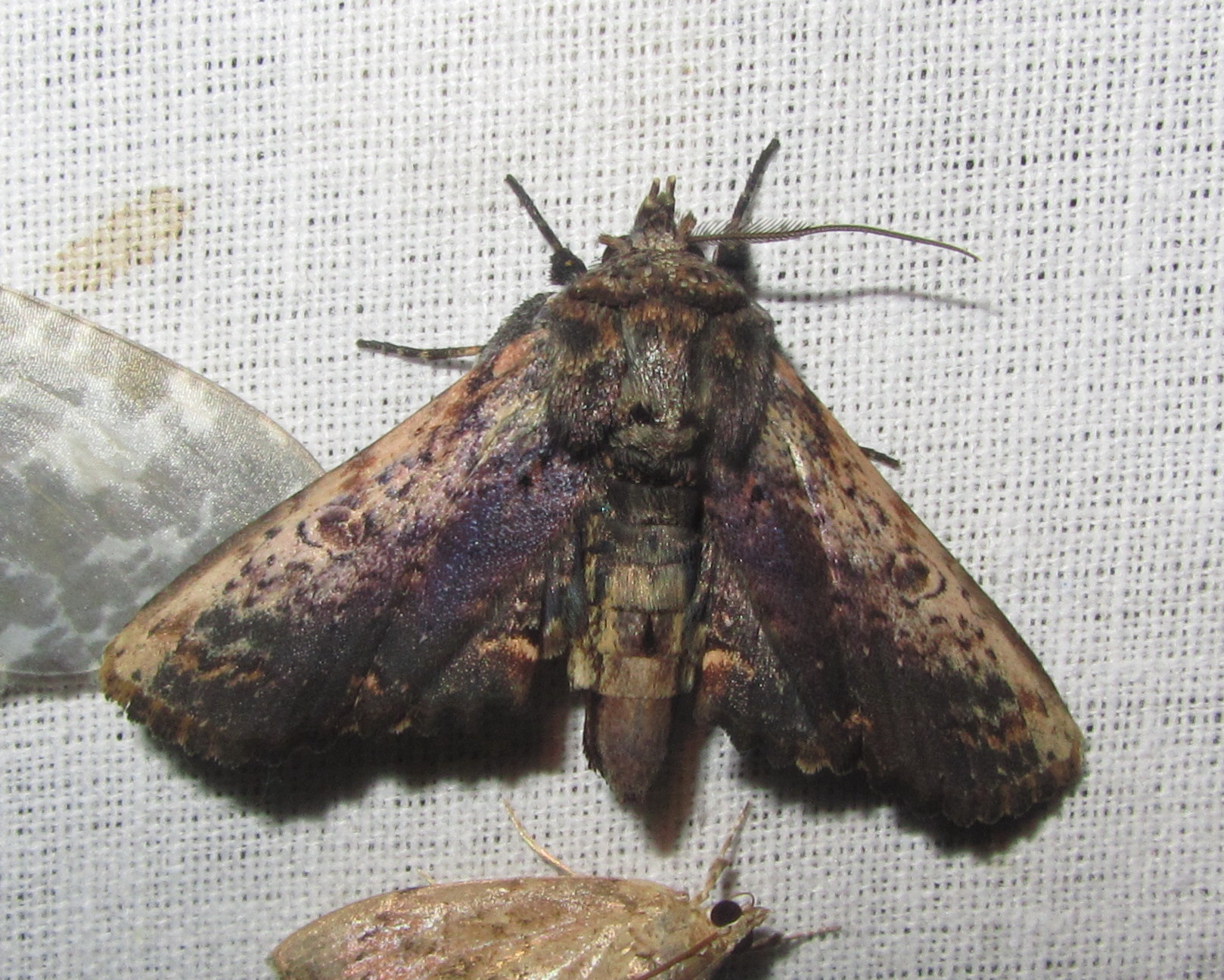

Scientific classification
- Kingdom: Animalia
- Phylum: Arthropoda
- Class: Insecta
- Order: Lepidoptera
- Superfamily: Noctuoidea
- Family: Euteliidae
- Genus: Anuga
- Species: A. multiplicans

Binomial name
- Anuga multiplicans Walker, 1858

= Anuga multiplicans =

Species of moth

Anuga multiplicans is a moth of the family Noctuidae first described by Francis Walker in 1858. It is found in India, Sri Lanka, Hong Kong, Korea, Taiwan, Philippines and Borneo.

Forewings darker and with subtornal orange spot. Discal spot on hindwing. Hindwing tornus is orange.

== Subspecies ==
Two subspecies are recognized. However, subspecies rotunda is sometimes considered to be a sister-species of A. multiplicans.

- Anuga multiplicans elegans Prout, 1928
- Anuga multiplicans rotunda Walker, 1858

== Gallery ==
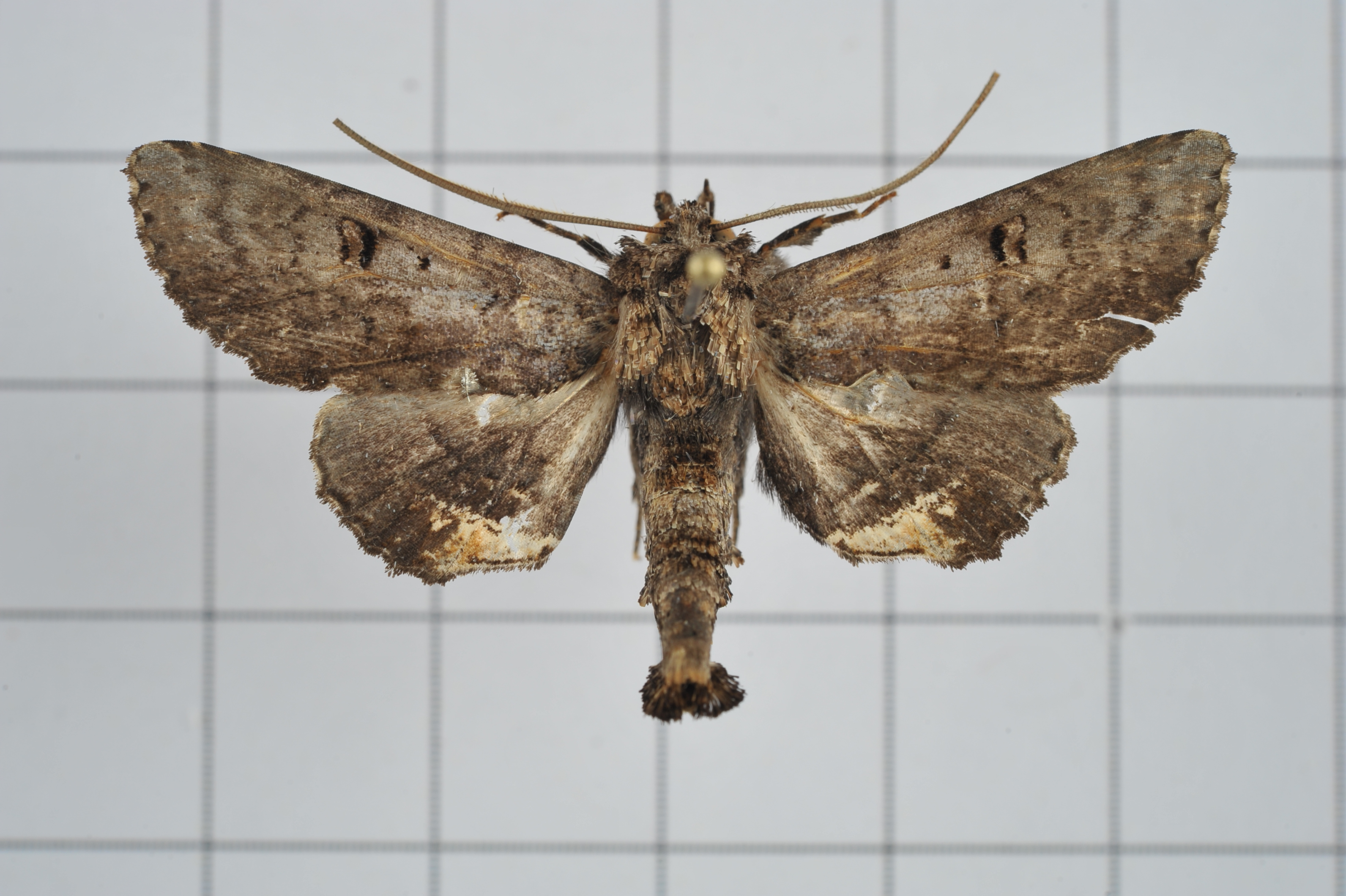

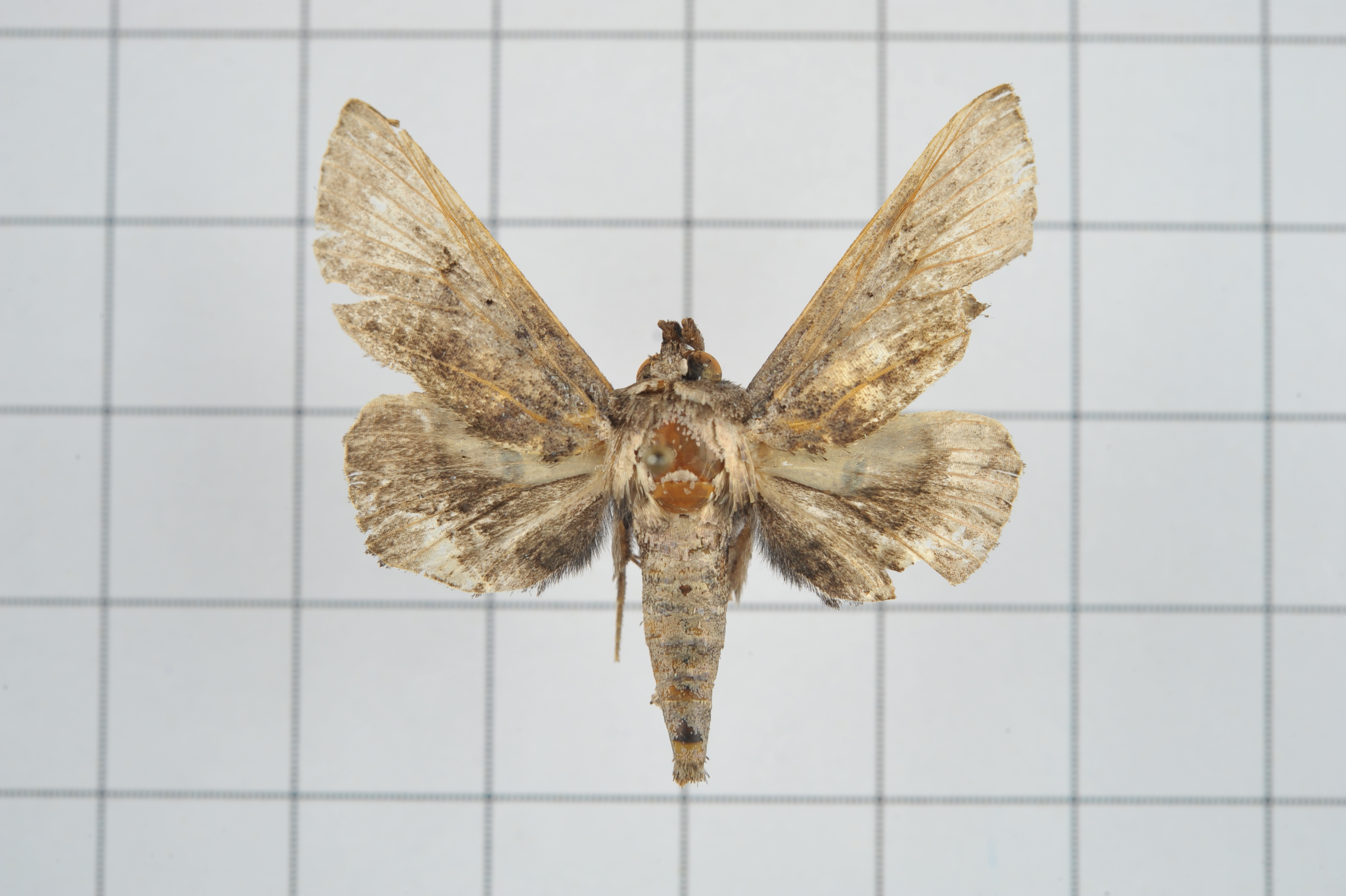

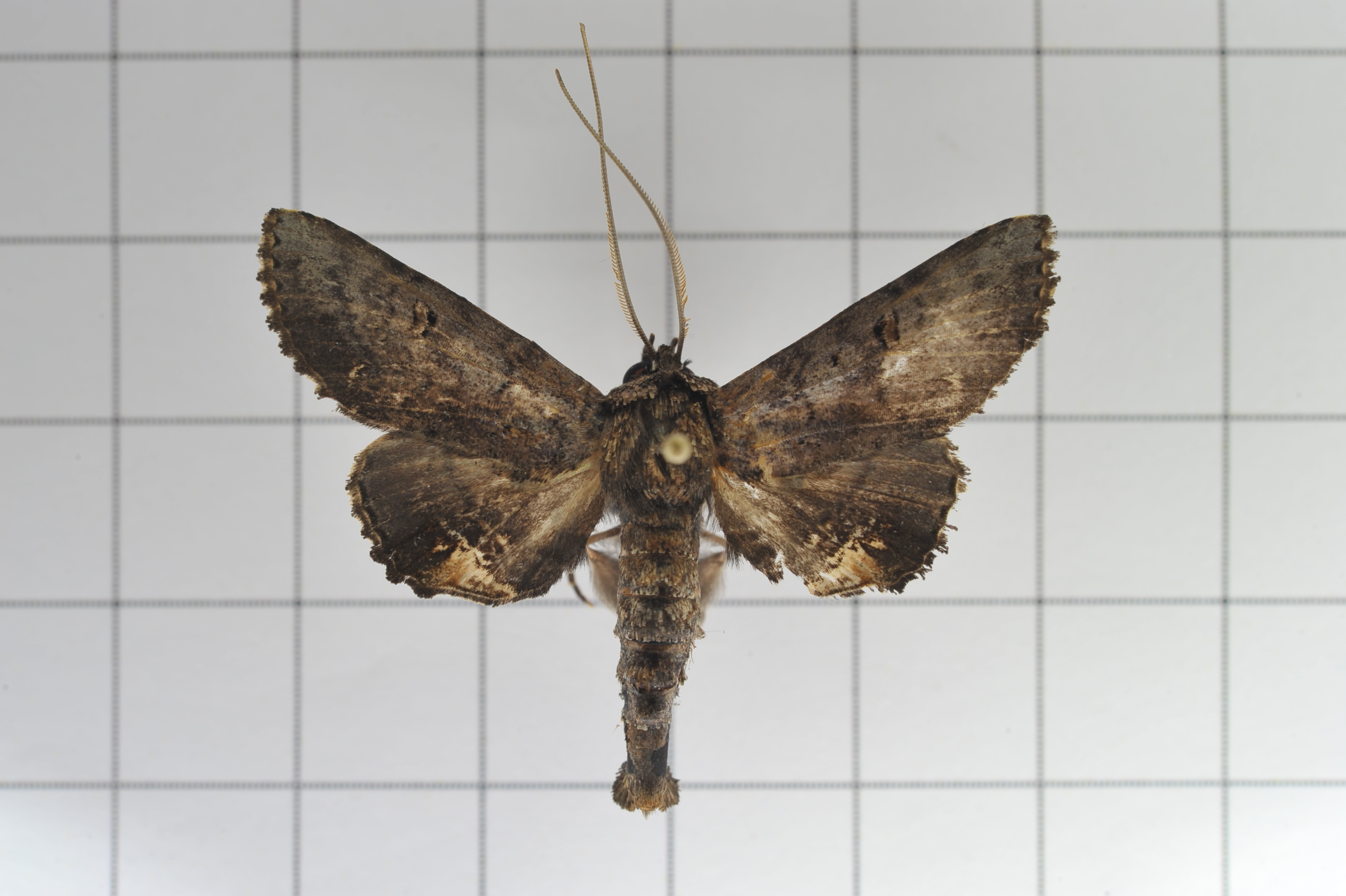

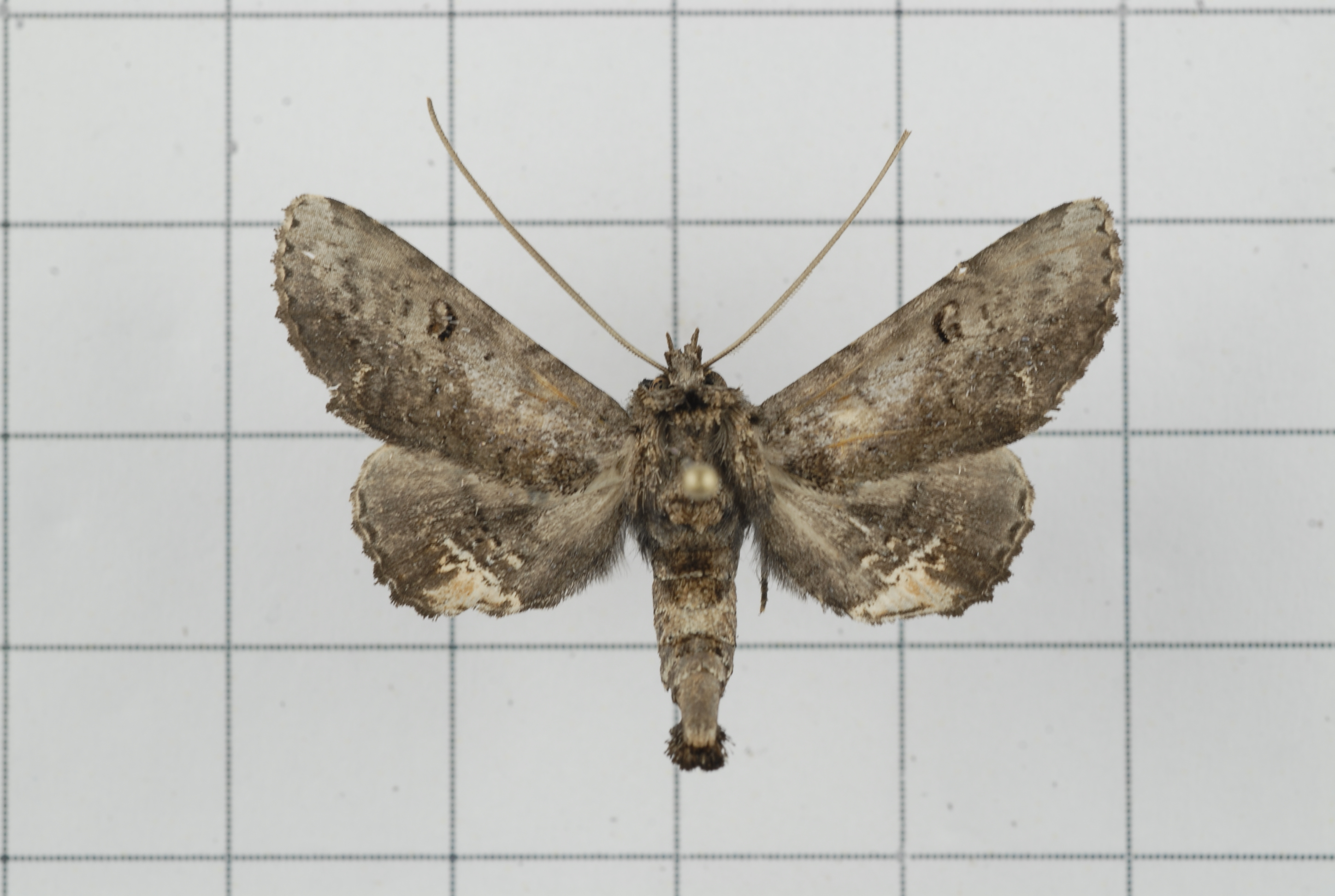
