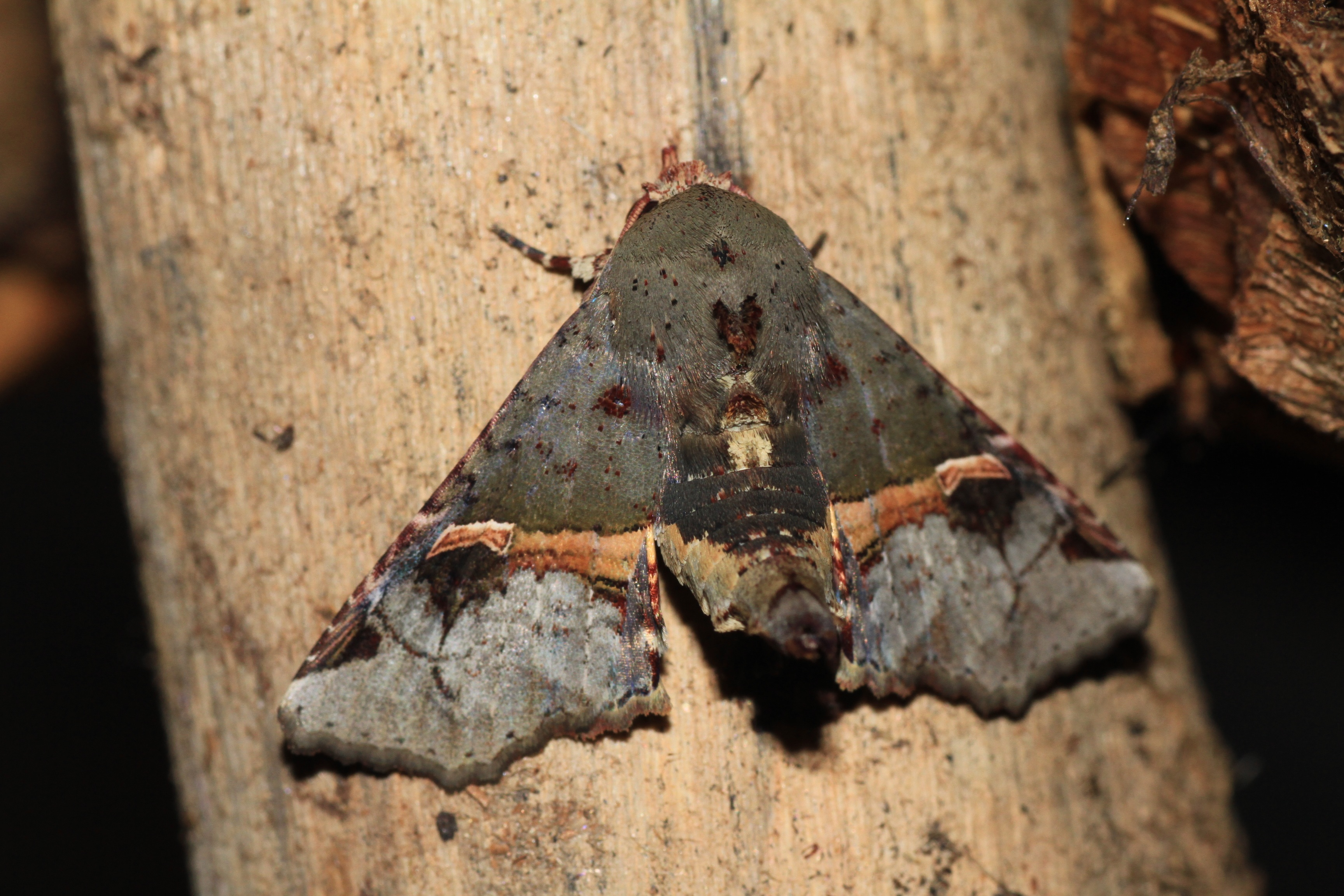

Scientific classification
- Kingdom: Animalia
- Phylum: Arthropoda
- Class: Insecta
- Order: Lepidoptera
- Superfamily: Noctuoidea
- Family: Euteliidae
- Subfamily: Euteliinae
- Genus: Targalla; Walker, [1858]

Synonyms
- Cryassa Walker, 1858; Euteliella Roepke, 1938

= Targalla =

Genus of moths

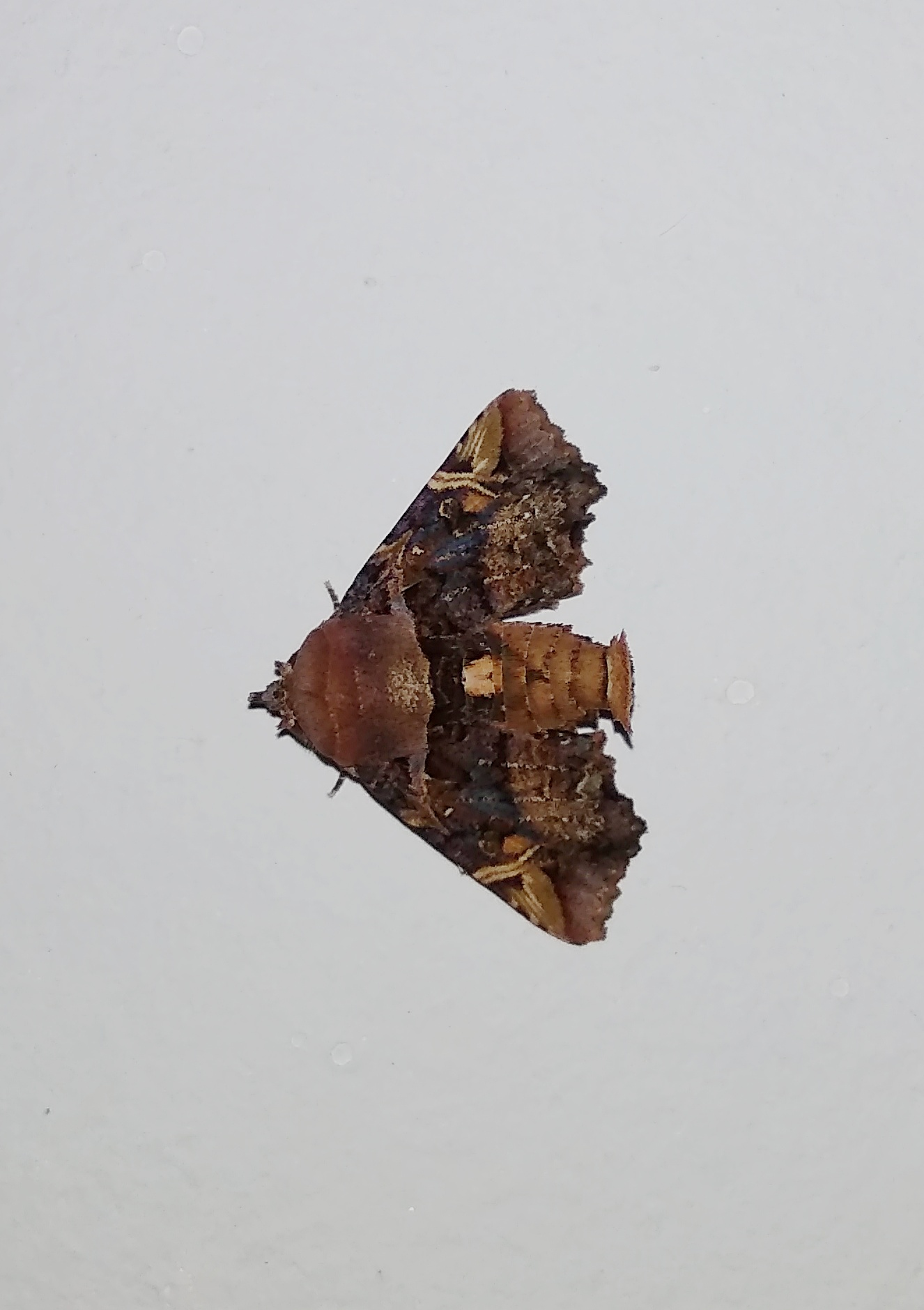
Targalla albiceps from Palakkad Kerala India

Targalla is a genus of moths of the family Euteliidae. The genus was erected by Francis Walker in 1858.

== Species ==
- Targalla albiceps (Hampson, 1894) Indian subregion, Myanmar, Taiwan, Peninsular Malaysia, Borneo
- Targalla alboquadrata Holloway, 1985 Borne, western Sulawesi
- Targalla apicifascia (Hampson, 1894) Oriental tropics, Sundaland, New Guinea, Solomons
- Targalla atripars (Hampson, 1912) Sundaland, Solomons
- Targalla barbara (Robinson, 1975) Fiji
- Targalla bifacies (Walker, 1858) Sri Lanka
- Targalla carnea Warren, 1914 Rajasthan
- Targalla delatrix (Guenée, 1852) Indo-Australian tropics, Fiji, Rapa, Society Islands
- Targalla duplicilinea (Walker, 1862) Oriental tropics to Sundaland, Philippines, Sulawesi
- Targalla eriopoides (Roepke, 1938) Sulawesi
- Targalla infida Walker, [1858] Myanmar, Laos, northern Vietnam, Borneo, Philippines, Sulawesi, New Guinea, Australia
- Targalla ludatrix (Walker, 1858)
- Targalla palliatrix (Guenée, 1852) India, Thailand, Peninsular Malaysia, Taiwan, Sundaland, Fiji, Smaoa
- Targalla pantarcha (Turner, 1922) northern Queensland, Philippines, Sulawesi, New Guinea
- Targalla plumbea (Walker, 1865) Queensland
- Targalla purpureonigra (Bethune-Baker, 1906) New Guinea
- Targalla repleta (Walker, 1865)
- Targalla scelerata (Holland, 1900) Borneo, Philippines, Sulawesi, New Guinea, Queensland, Solomons
- Targalla silvicola Watabiki & Yoshimatsu, 2014 northern Vietnam, Laos, China (Guangdong, Guangxi, Hong Kong), Taiwan, Japan
- Targalla subocellata (Walker, [1863]) north-eastern Himalayas, Sundaland, Philippines, Sulawesi, southern Moluccas, New Guinea, Queensland
- Targalla suffundens (Walker, [1863]) Indo-Australian tropics to Queensland
- Targalla sugii Holloway, 1985 Sikkim, Cherrapunji, Nepal, Thailand, northern Vietnam
- Targalla transversa (Candéze, 1927) Vietnam, Borneo, New Guinea, Bismarcks
