= Aegilia =

Scientific classification
- Kingdom: Animalia
- Phylum: Arthropoda
- Class: Insecta
- Order: Lepidoptera
- Superfamily: Noctuoidea
- Family: Euteliidae
- Genus: Aegilia; Walker, [1858]

Genus of moths

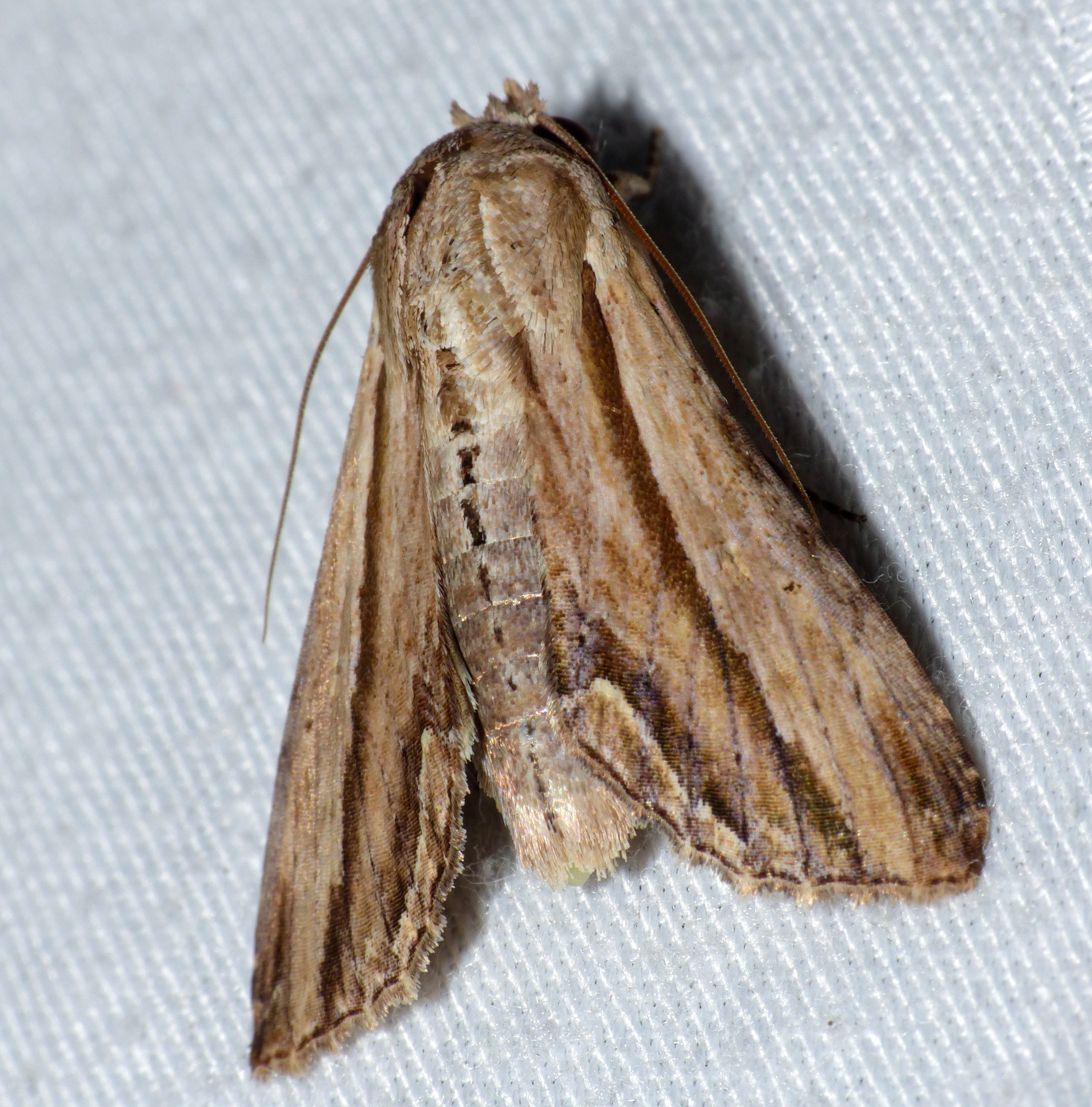
Aegilia describens

Aegilia is a genus of moths of the family Euteliidae.

== Species ==
- Aegilia describens Walker, [1858]
- Aegilia indescribens Prout, 1922
