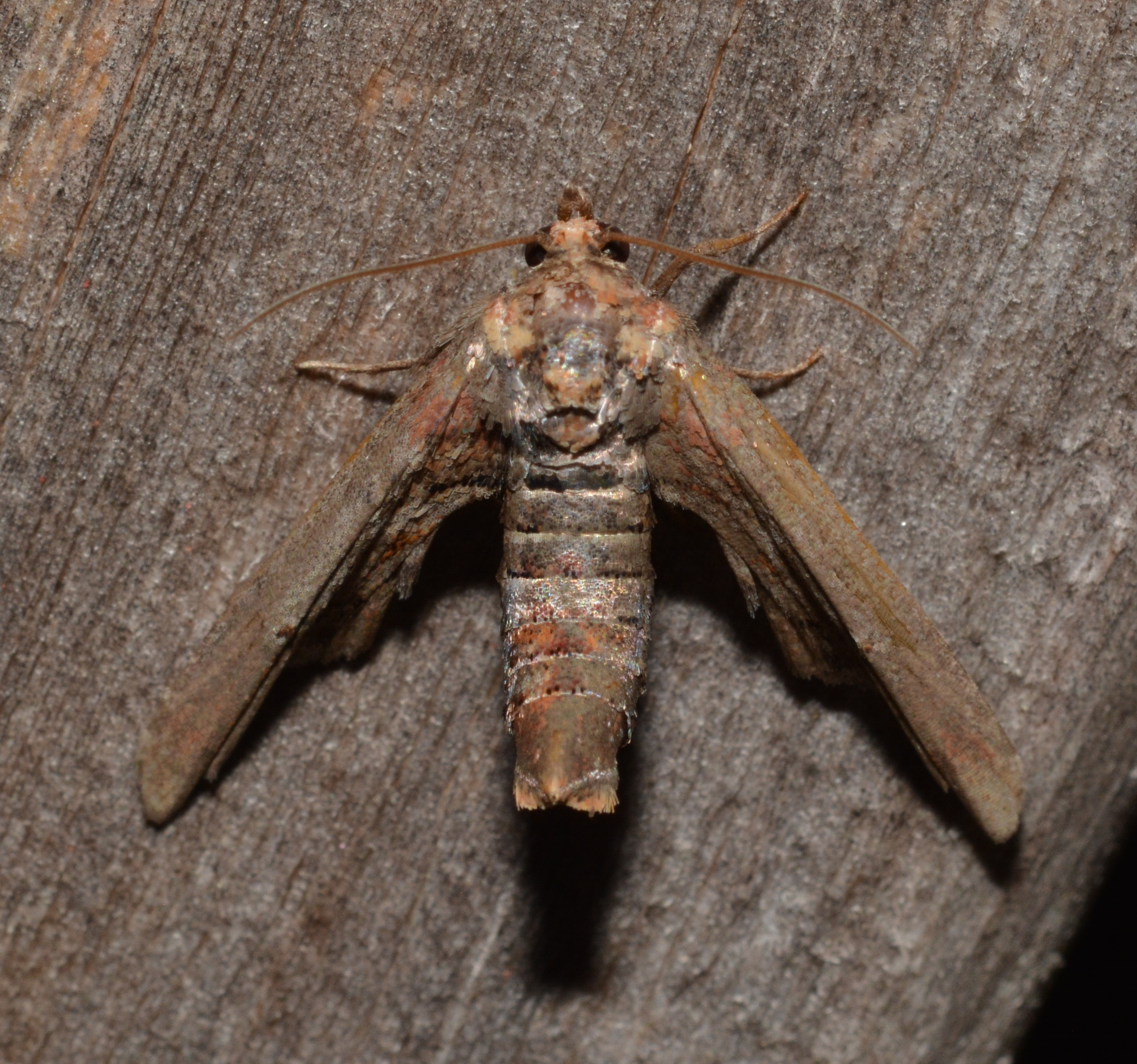
- Marathyssa inficita

Scientific classification
- Kingdom: Animalia
- Phylum: Arthropoda
- Class: Insecta
- Order: Lepidoptera
- Superfamily: Noctuoidea
- Family: Euteliidae
- Subfamily: Euteliinae
- Genus: Marathyssa; Walker, 1865

Synonyms
- Marasmalus Grote, 1872; Pangraptica Wileman & South, 1921; Schazama Schaus, 1906

= Marathyssa =

Genus of moths

Marathyssa is a genus of moths of the family Euteliidae. The genus was erected by Francis Walker in 1865.

== Species ==
- Marathyssa albidisca (Hampson, 1905) South Africa, Zimbabwe
- Marathyssa albistigma Wileman & South, 1921
- Marathyssa angustipennis (Schaus, 1906) Brazil (São Paulo)
- Marathyssa basalis Walker, 1865 New York, Massachusetts
- Marathyssa chacoensis Barbut & Lalanne-Cassou, 2011 Bolivia
- Marathyssa cistellatrix (Wallengren, 1860) South Africa
- Marathyssa cuneades Draudt, 1950
- Marathyssa cuneata (Saalmüller, 1891) Africa
- Marathyssa furcata (Walker, 1865)
- Marathyssa harmonica (Hampson, 1898) Sikkim, southern India
- Marathyssa homogena Kobes, 2008
- Marathyssa incisa Kobes, 1994
- Marathyssa inficita (Walker, 1865) New York to Texas
- Marathyssa minus Dyar, 1921 Texas, Arizona
- Marathyssa ochreiplaga Bethune-Baker, 1906
- Marathyssa ocularis Butler, 1875
- Marathyssa procera Saalmüller, 1891
- Marathyssa pulcherrimus (Grote, 1865) (beautiful marathyssa moth)
- Marathyssa pyrastis (Hampson, 1905)
- Marathyssa umbratilis Köhler, 1968
