= Odontodes (moth) =

Scientific classification
- Kingdom: Animalia
- Phylum: Arthropoda
- Class: Insecta
- Order: Lepidoptera
- Superfamily: Noctuoidea
- Family: Euteliidae
- Genus: Odontodes; Guenée, 1852

Synonyms
- Burdria Walker, 1869; Nedroma Walker, 1869

Genus of moths

Odontodes is a genus of moths of the family Euteliidae.

== Description ==
Antennae very long and slender. Palpi slender and upturned, where the second joint reaching vertex of head and third joint short. Thorax smoothly scaled. Abdomen with a tuft on first segment. Forewings slightly arched towards rectangular apex. Outer angle slightly hooked and slight tufts of raised scales present.
