= Parelia =

Scientific classification
- Domain: Eukaryota
- Kingdom: Animalia
- Phylum: Arthropoda
- Class: Insecta
- Order: Lepidoptera
- Superfamily: Noctuoidea
- Family: Euteliidae
- Subfamily: Euteliinae
- Genus: Parelia; Berio, 1957
- Species: P. albivirgula

Binomial name
- Parelia albivirgula Berio, 1957

Genus of moths

Parelia is a monotypic moth genus of the family Euteliidae. Its only species, Parelia albivirgula, is found on Madagascar. Both the genus and species were first described by Emilio Berio in 1957.
