= Nagara (moth) =

Scientific classification
- Kingdom: Animalia
- Phylum: Arthropoda
- Class: Insecta
- Order: Lepidoptera
- Superfamily: Noctuoidea
- Family: Euteliidae
- Genus: Nagara; Walker, 1866

Genus of moths

Nagara is a genus of moths of the family Euteliidae.
