= Aplotelia =

Scientific classification
- Domain: Eukaryota
- Kingdom: Animalia
- Phylum: Arthropoda
- Class: Insecta
- Order: Lepidoptera
- Superfamily: Noctuoidea
- Family: Euteliidae
- Subfamily: Euteliinae
- Genus: Aplotelia; Warren, 1914

Genus of moths

Aplotelia is a genus of moths of the family Euteliidae. The genus was described by Warren in 1914.

== Species ==
- Aplotelia diplographa (Hampson, 1905) north-eastern Himalayas, Peninsular Malaysia, Sumatra, Borneo
- Aplotelia nubilosa Warren, 1914 Peninsular Malaysia, Sumatra, Borneo, Philippines
- Aplotelia oetakwa Holloway, 1985 New Guinea
- Aplotelia tripartita (Semper, 1900) New Guinea, Philippines, Solomons
