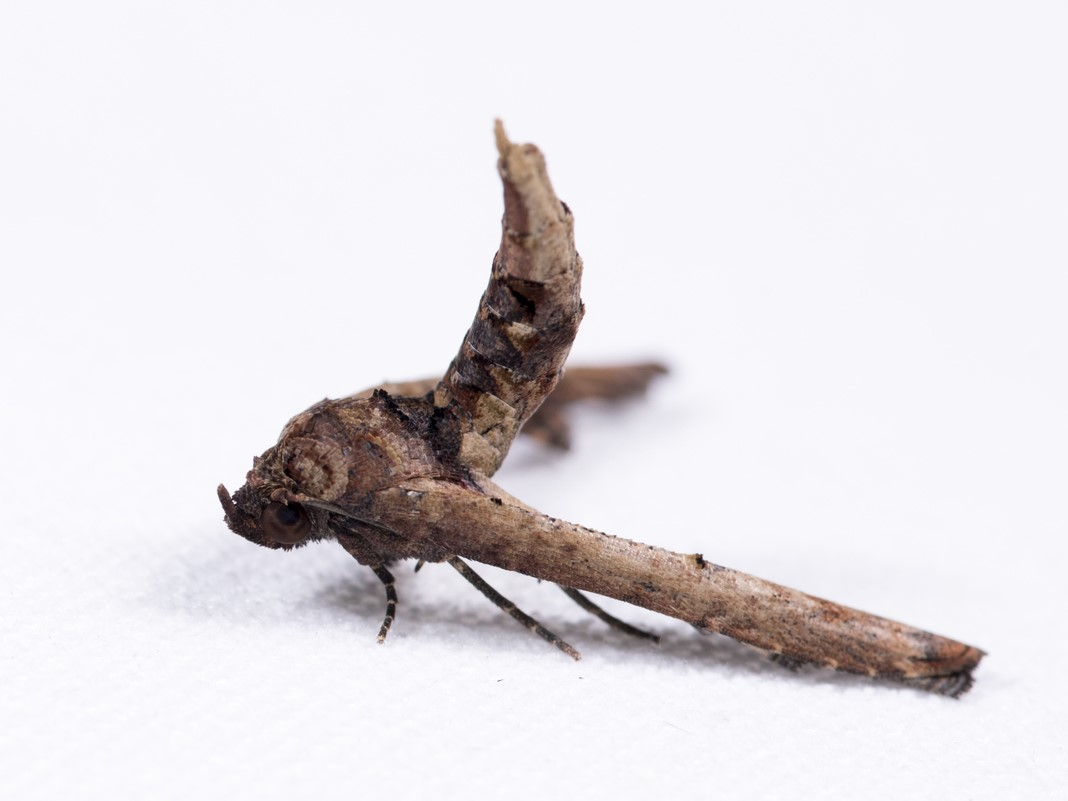
- Anigraea homochroa

Scientific classification
- Kingdom: Animalia
- Phylum: Arthropoda
- Class: Insecta
- Order: Lepidoptera
- Superfamily: Noctuoidea
- Family: Euteliidae
- Subfamily: Euteliinae
- Genus: Anigraea; Walker, 1862

= Anigraea =

Genus of moths

Anigraea is a genus of moths in the family Euteliidae. The genus was erected by Francis Walker in 1862.

== Species ==
- Anigraea albibasis Wileman & West, 1928 Philippines
- Anigraea albomaculata (Hampson, 1894) Indian subregion, Thailand, Andamans, Borneo, Sulawesi
- Anigraea cinctipalpis (Walker, 1865) Indian subregion, Peninsular Malaysia, Borneo, Philippines, New Guinea, Queensland
- Anigraea deleta (Hampson, 1891) Indian subregion, Myanmar, Borneo, Java, New Guinea
- Anigraea fulviceps Warren, 1914 Solomons, New Guinea
- Anigraea homochroa Hampson, 1912 Borneo, New Guinea
- Anigraea mediifascia (Hampson, 1894) Myanmar, Peninsular Malaysia, Singapore, Andamans, Sumatra, Borneo
- Anigraea mediopunctata (Pagenstecher, 1900) Sundaland, Sulawesi, New Guinea, Bismarcks
- Anigraea ochrobasis Hampson, 1912 Queensland
- Anigraea particolor Warren, 1914 New Guinea
- Anigraea pectinata Robinson, 1975 Fiji
- Anigraea phaeopera Hampson, 1912 Peninsular Malaysia, Sumatra, Borneo
- Anigraea purpurascens Hampson, 1912 Ghana
- Anigraea rubida Walker, 1862 north-eastern Himalayas, Peninsular Malaysia, Taiwan, Borneo, Sulawesi
- Anigraea rufibasis Warren, 1914 Solomon Islands
- Anigraea serratilinea Warren, 1914 north-eastern Himalayas, Sundaland, Philippines, Sulawesi, New Guinea
- Anigraea siccata (Hampson, 1905) Sierra Leone, Nigeria
- Anigraea viridata (Bethune-Baker, 1906) New Guinea
