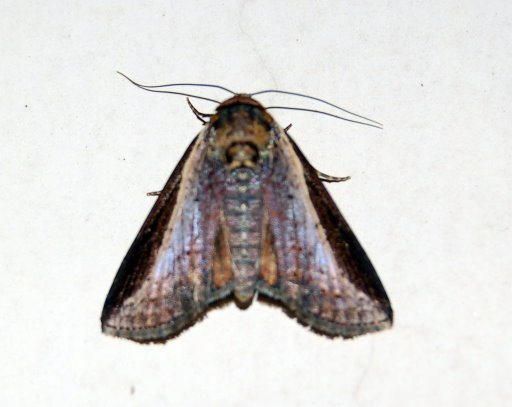
- Lophoptera squammigera

Scientific classification
- Kingdom: Animalia
- Phylum: Arthropoda
- Clade: Pancrustacea
- Class: Insecta
- Order: Lepidoptera
- Superfamily: Noctuoidea
- Family: Euteliidae
- Genus: Lophoptera; Guenée, 1852

Synonyms
- Ciasa Walker, 1863; Evia Walker, 1863; Sadarsa Moore, 1852

= Lophoptera =

Genus of moths

Lophoptera is a genus of moths of the family Euteliidae.

== Species ==
- Lophoptera abbreviata Walker, 1865
- Lophoptera africana (Berio, 1974)
- Lophoptera arabica Hacker & Fibiger, 2006
- Lophoptera bismigera Holloway,
- Lophoptera buruana (Holland, 1900)
- Lophoptera conspicua Berio, 1957
- Lophoptera hemithyris Hampson, 1905
- Lophoptera illucida (Walker, 1865)
- Lophoptera lineigera Holloway,
- Lophoptera litigiosa (Boisduval, 1833)
- Lophoptera longipennis (Moore, 1882)
- Lophoptera melanesigera Holloway, 1985
- Lophoptera methyalea (Hampson, 1902)
- Lophoptera nama Swinhoe, 1900
- Lophoptera paranthyala (Holland, 1900)
- Lophoptera pustulifera (Walker, 1864)
- Lophoptera semirufa Druce, 1911
- Lophoptera squammigera Guenee, 1852
- Lophoptera vittigera Walker, 1865
- Lophoptera togata Prout A. E., 1927
- Lophoptera triangulata Berio, 1973
