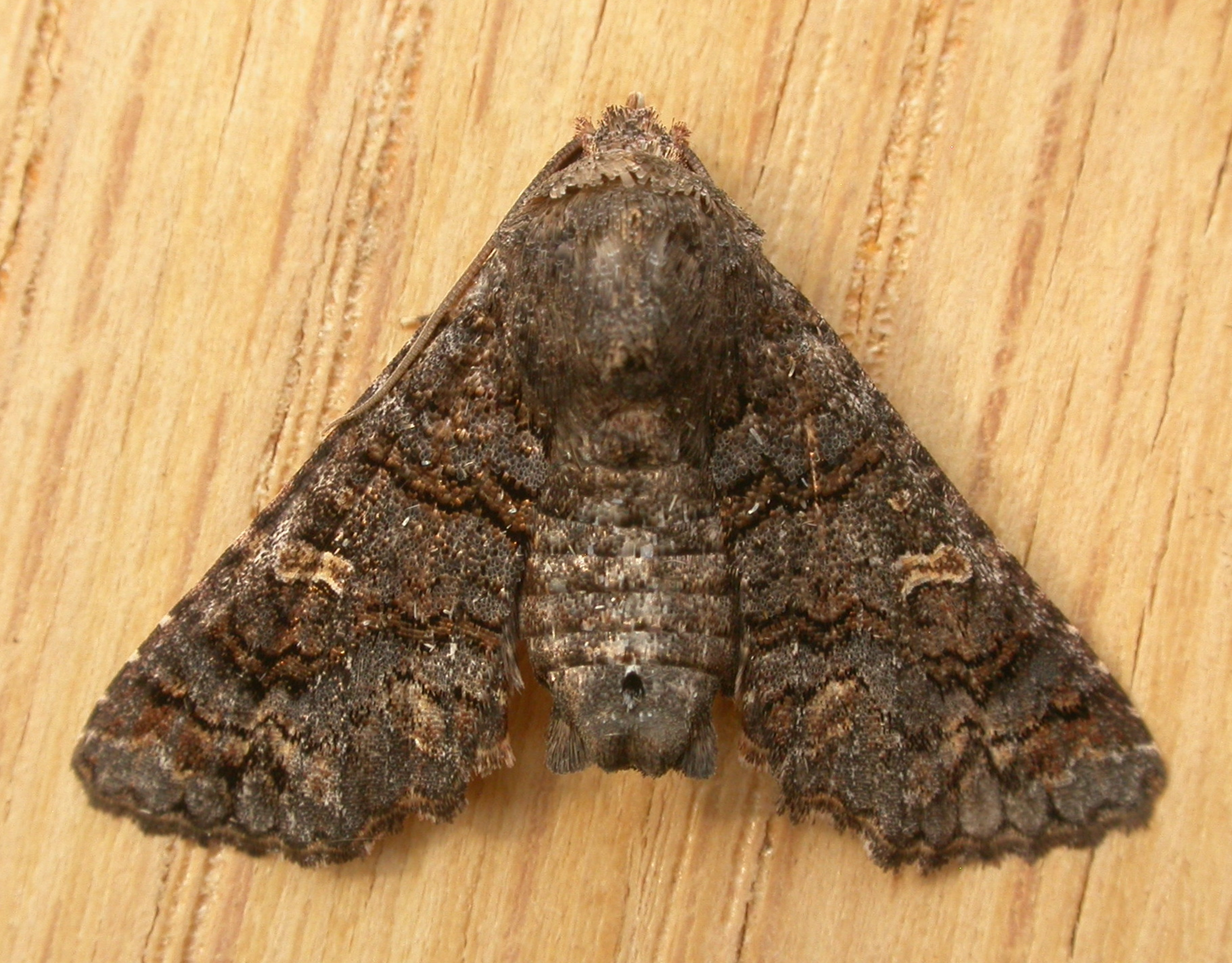
- Pataeta carbo

Scientific classification
- Kingdom: Animalia
- Phylum: Arthropoda
- Class: Insecta
- Order: Lepidoptera
- Superfamily: Noctuoidea
- Family: Euteliidae
- Subfamily: Euteliinae
- Genus: Pataeta; Walker, 1858

= Pataeta =

Genus of moths

Pataeta is a genus of moths in the family Euteliidae. The genus was erected by Francis Walker in 1858.

== Species ==
- Pataeta carbo (Guenée, 1852) Australia, Sulawesi
- Pataeta hoenei Berio, 1964 Guangdong
- Pataeta transversata Berio, 1966 Zaire, Tanzania, Mozambique
