= Sigmuncus =

Scientific classification
- Domain: Eukaryota
- Kingdom: Animalia
- Phylum: Arthropoda
- Class: Insecta
- Order: Lepidoptera
- Superfamily: Noctuoidea
- Family: Euteliidae
- Genus: Sigmuncus

Genus of moths

Sigmuncus is a genus of moths of the family Euteliidae.
