= Erysthia =

Scientific classification
- Kingdom: Animalia
- Phylum: Arthropoda
- Class: Insecta
- Order: Lepidoptera
- Superfamily: Noctuoidea
- Family: Euteliidae
- Subfamily: Euteliinae
- Genus: Erysthia; Walker, 1862
- Species: E. obliquata

Binomial name
- Erysthia obliquata Walker, 1862

Genus of moths

Erysthia is a monotypic moth genus of the family Euteliidae. Its only species is Erysthia obliquata. The type locality is not known and the type has been lost. Both the genus and species were first described by Francis Walker in 1862.
