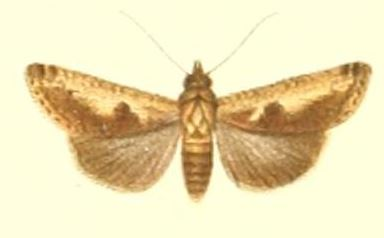
- Gyrtona albicans

Scientific classification
- Kingdom: Animalia
- Phylum: Arthropoda
- Clade: Pancrustacea
- Class: Insecta
- Order: Lepidoptera
- Superfamily: Noctuoidea
- Family: Euteliidae
- Genus: Gyrtona; Walker, 1863

Type species
- Gyrtona proximalis Walker, 1863

Synonyms
- Chuduca Walker, 1863; Clina Walker, 1865; Nigramma Walker, 1863

= Gyrtona =

Genus of moths

Gyrtona is a genus of moths of the family Euteliidae first described by Francis Walker in 1863.

== Description ==
Similar to Stictoptera, differs in porrect palpi and more hairy. A large frontal tuft present. Antennae with long cilia in male and abdomen tuftless. Forewings with slightly raised tufts at middle and end of cell.

== Species ==
- Gyrtona albicans (Pagenstecher 1900)
- Gyrtona erebenna (Mabille, 1900)
- Gyrtona eusema (Prout, 1926)
- Gyrtona ferrimissalis Walker, 1863
- Gyrtona inclusalis Walker, 1863
- Gyrtona hylusalis Walker, 1863
- Gyrtona lapidarioides Holloway, ??
- Gyrtona malgassica Kenrick, 1917
- Gyrtona niveivitta Swinhoe, 1905
- Gyrtona obliqualis Holloway, ??
- Gyrtona oxyptera Hampson, 1912
- Gyrtona perlignealis (Walker, 1863)
- Gyrtona polionota Hampson, 1905
- Gyrtona polymorpha Hampson, 1905
- Gyrtona proximalis Walker, 1863
- Gyrtona pseudoquadratifera Holloway, ??
- Gyrtona purpurea Robinson, 1975
- Gyrtona pyraloides (Walker, 1864)
- Gyrtona semicarbonalis Walker, 1863
