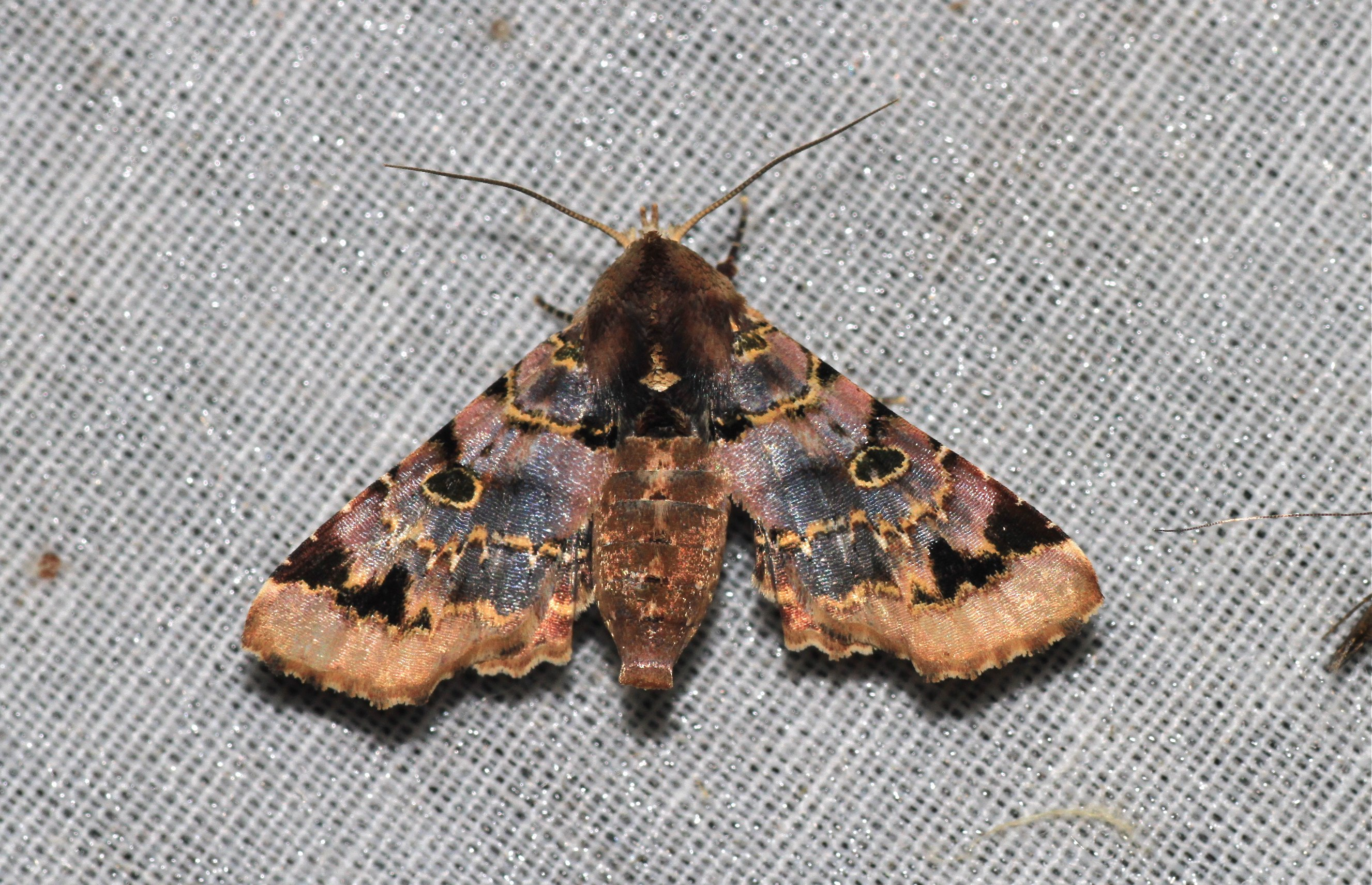
- Atacira winseri

Scientific classification
- Kingdom: Animalia
- Phylum: Arthropoda
- Class: Insecta
- Order: Lepidoptera
- Superfamily: Noctuoidea
- Family: Euteliidae
- Subfamily: Euteliinae
- Genus: Atacira; C. Swinhoe, 1900

Type species
- Eutelia approximata Walker, [1863]

= Atacira =

Genus of moths

Atacira is a genus of moths of the family Euteliidae. The genus was described by Charles Swinhoe in 1900.

== Species ==
- Atacira affinis (Hampson, 1918) Taiwan
- Atacira angulata Holloway, 1985 Peninsular Malaysia, Sumatra, Borneo
- Atacira approximata (Walker, [1863]) Sundaland
- Atacira barlowi Holloway, 1985 Peninsular Malaysia, Borneo
- Atacira brunneata Holloway, 1985 Peninsular Malaysia, Sumatra, Borneo
- Atacira caesia (Roepke, 1938) N.Sulawesi
- Atacira chalybsa (Hampson, 1891) Oriental tropics to Sundaland
- Atacira chalybsoides Holloway, 1985 Borneo
- Atacira diehli (Kobes, 1982) Sumatra, Peninsular Malaysia, Borneo
- Atacira dimidiata (Walker, [1863]) Sundaland, Philippines, Sulawesi
- Atacira flaviluna (Hampson, 1905) Singapore, Borneo
- Atacira glauca (Prout, 1928) Sumatra, Peninsular Malaysia
- Atacira grabczewskii (Püngeler, 1904) Japan
- Atacira josephinae (Holloway, 1976) Borneo
- Atacira melanephra (Hampson, 1912) India, Sri Lanka
- Atacira mima (Prout, 1925) Arabia, Eritrea, Tanzania, South Africa
- Atacira olivacea Holloway, 1985 Borneo, Sumatra
- Atacira olivaceiplaga (Bethune-Baker, 1906) New Guinea
- Atacira pala Holloway, 1985 Borneo
- Atacira rubrirena Holloway, 1985 Borneo, western Sumatra, western Sulawesi, New Guinea
- Atacira smarti Holloway, 1985 Borneo
- Atacira sommereri (Kobes, 1982) Sumatra, Peninsular Malaysia
- Atacira waterstradti Holloway, 1985 Borneo
- Atacira winseri Holloway, 1985 Borneo, Sumatra
