= Colpocheilopteryx =

Scientific classification
- Kingdom: Animalia
- Phylum: Arthropoda
- Class: Insecta
- Order: Lepidoptera
- Superfamily: Noctuoidea
- Family: Euteliidae
- Subfamily: Euteliinae
- Genus: Colpocheilopteryx; Wallengren, 1865
- Species: C. operatrix

Binomial name
- Colpocheilopteryx operatrix (Wallengren, 1860)

Genus of moths

Colpocheilopteryx is a monotypic moth genus of the family Euteliidae. Its only species, Colpocheilopteryx operatrix, is found in the Democratic Republic of the Congo, South Africa, Zambia and Zimbabwe. Both the genus and species were first described by Hans Daniel Johan Wallengren, the genus in 1865 and the species five years earlier in 1860.

The Global Lepidoptera Names Index considers the generic name to be a synonym of Eutelia.
