= Kobestelia =

Scientific classification
- Kingdom: Animalia
- Phylum: Arthropoda
- Clade: Pancrustacea
- Class: Insecta
- Order: Lepidoptera
- Superfamily: Noctuoidea
- Family: Euteliidae
- Genus: Kobestelia; Holloway, 1985

Genus of moths

Kobestelia is a genus of moths of the family Euteliidae. The genus was erected by Jeremy Daniel Holloway in 1985.

== Species ==
- Kobestelia obliquata (Walker, [1863]) Peninsular Malaysia, Sumatra, Borneo
- Kobestelia rosea (Holloway, 1985) Borneo, Sumatra, Peninsular Malaysia
