= Thyriodes =

Scientific classification
- Kingdom: Animalia
- Phylum: Arthropoda
- Class: Insecta
- Order: Lepidoptera
- Superfamily: Noctuoidea
- Family: Euteliidae
- Subfamily: Euteliinae
- Genus: Thyriodes; Guenée in Boisduval & Guenée, 1852

Genus of moths

Thyriodes is a genus of moths of the family Euteliidae. The genus was erected by Achille Guenée in 1852.

== Species ==
- Thyriodes dissimilis (Druce, 1911) Colombia
- Thyriodes flabellum Guenée, 1852 Mexico
- Thyriodes terrabensis Schaus, 1912 Costa Rica
