= Savoca (moth) =

Scientific classification
- Kingdom: Animalia
- Phylum: Arthropoda
- Class: Insecta
- Order: Lepidoptera
- Superfamily: Noctuoidea
- Family: Euteliidae
- Genus: Savoca; Walker, 1864

Genus of moths

Savoca is a genus of moths of the family Euteliidae.

== Species ==
- Savoca divitalis Walker, 1863
- Savoca lophota Turner, 1909
- Savoca xista Swinhoe, 1893
