= Caedesa =

Scientific classification
- Kingdom: Animalia
- Phylum: Arthropoda
- Class: Insecta
- Order: Lepidoptera
- Superfamily: Noctuoidea
- Family: Euteliidae
- Subfamily: Euteliinae
- Genus: Caedesa; Walker, 1862

Genus of moths

Caedesa is a genus of moths of the family Euteliidae. The genus was erected by Francis Walker in 1862.

== Species ==
- Caedesa agropoides Walker, 1862 Borneo, Sumatra
- Caedesa angulifera (Walker, [1863]) Borneo, Sumatra
- Caedesa apicenigra (Warren, 1914) Malaysia
