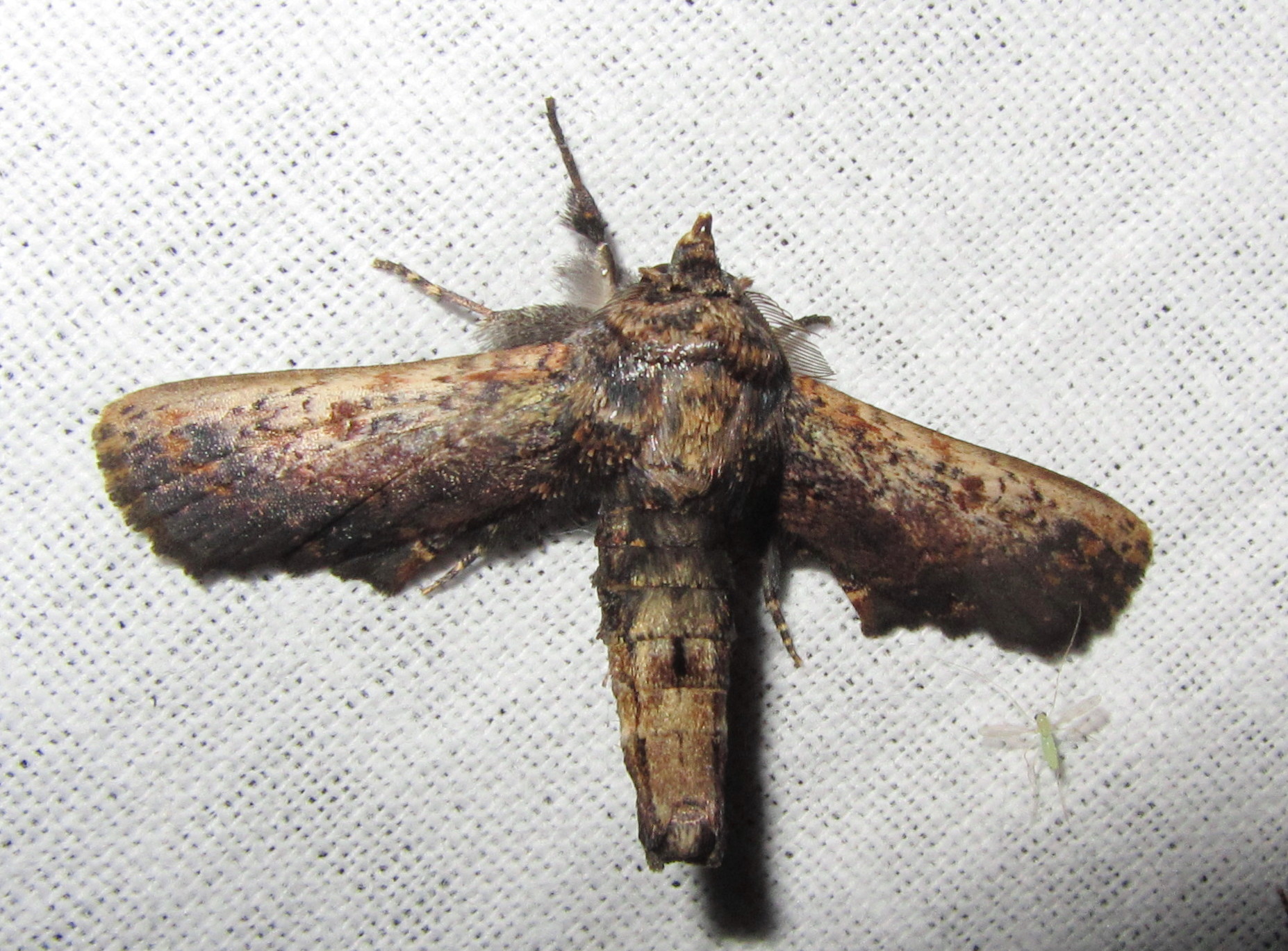

Scientific classification
- Kingdom: Animalia
- Phylum: Arthropoda
- Class: Insecta
- Order: Lepidoptera
- Superfamily: Noctuoidea
- Family: Euteliidae
- Subfamily: Euteliinae
- Genus: Anuga; Guenée in Boisduval & Guenée, 1852

Synonyms
- Piada Walker, 1858; Caecila Walker, 1858; Phumana Walker, [1863]; Spersara Walker, [1863]; Mimanuga Warren, 1913

= Anuga =

Genus of moths

Anuga is a genus of moths of the family Euteliidae. The genus was erected by Achille Guenée in 1852.

== Species ==
- Anuga brevis Prout, 1928 Sumatra
- Anuga canescens (Walker, [1863]) Borneo
- Anuga cineracea Wileman & West, 1928 Philippines
- Anuga constricta Guenée, 1852 Oriental tropics - Sundaland, Philippines, Sulawesi
- Anuga elegans Prout, 1928 Sumatra
- Anuga fida C. Swinhoe, 1902 Peninsular Malaysia, Sumatra, Borneo
- Anuga fidoides Holloway, 1985 Borneo
- Anuga indigofera Holloway, 1976 Peninsular Malaysia, Sumatra, Borneo
- Anuga insuffusa Warren, 1914 Peninsular Malaysia, Sumatra, Myanmar, Thailand, Borneo
- Anuga japonica (Leech, 1889) Japan
- Anuga juventa C. Swinhoe, 1902 Peninsular Malaysia, Borneo
- Anuga juventoides Holloway, 1985 Borneo, Sumatra
- Anuga kobesi Holloway, 1985 Sundaland (not Bali)
- Anuga lunulata Moore, 1867 Bengal
- Anuga multiplicans (Walker, 1858) Canara
- Anuga rotunda Holloway, 1976 Borneo
- Anuga supraconstricta Yoshimoto, 1993 Nepal
- Anuga violescens (Mell, 1943) Kuangtung
