= Anigraeopsis =

Scientific classification
- Domain: Eukaryota
- Kingdom: Animalia
- Phylum: Arthropoda
- Class: Insecta
- Order: Lepidoptera
- Superfamily: Noctuoidea
- Family: Euteliidae
- Subfamily: Euteliinae
- Genus: Anigraeopsis; Warren, 1914
- Species: A. subalbiplaga

Binomial name
- Anigraeopsis subalbiplaga Warren, 1914

Genus of moths

Anigraeopsis is a monotypic moth genus of the family Euteliidae. Its only species, Anigraeopsis subalbiplaga, is found on New Guinea. Both the genus and species were first described by Warren in 1914.
