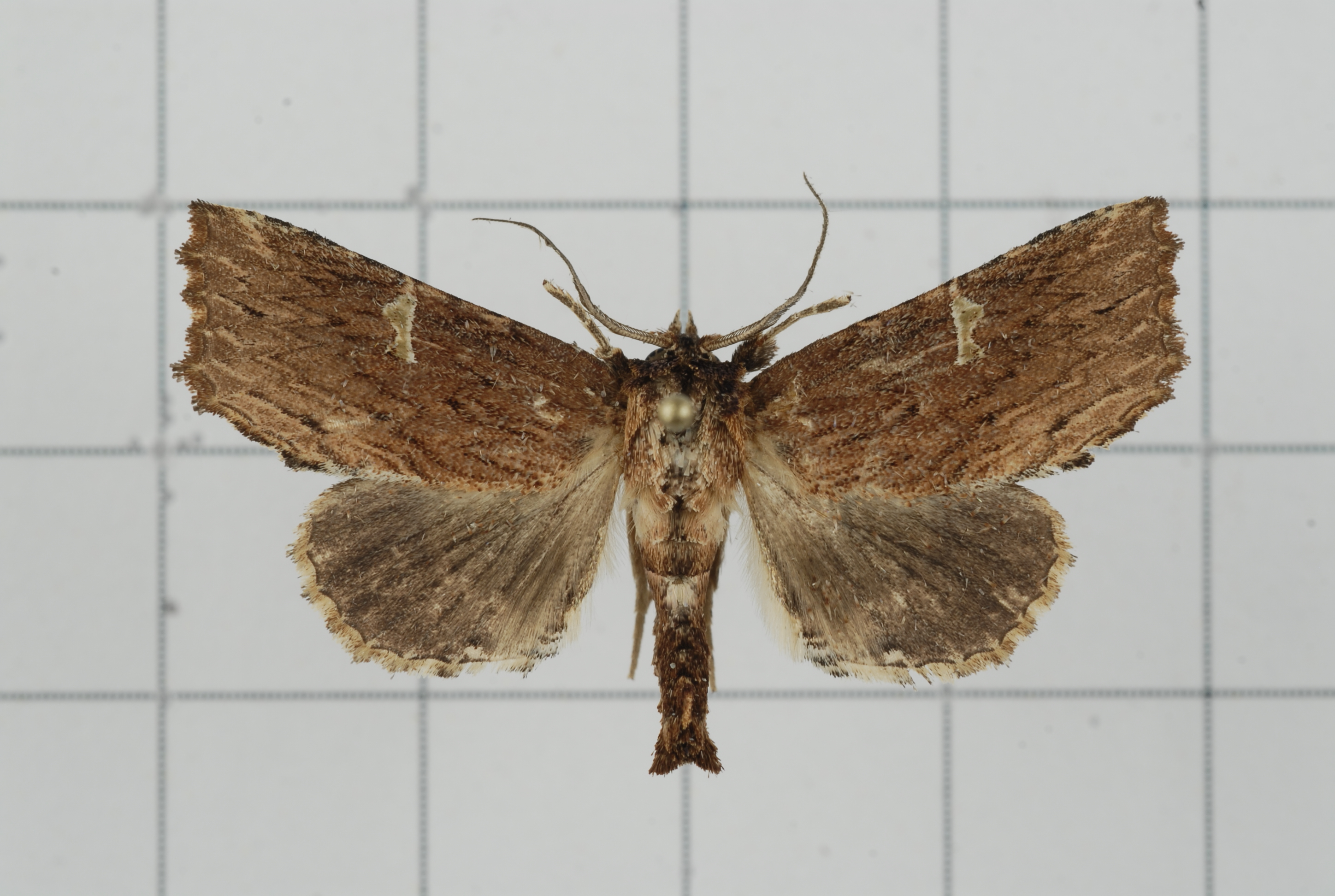
- Phalga clarirena (Sugi, 1982)

Scientific classification
- Kingdom: Animalia
- Phylum: Arthropoda
- Class: Insecta
- Order: Lepidoptera
- Superfamily: Noctuoidea
- Family: Euteliidae
- Subfamily: Euteliinae
- Genus: Phalga; Moore, 1881

= Phalga =

Genus of moths

Phalga is a genus of moths of the family Euteliidae. The genus was erected by Moore in 1881.

The Global Lepidoptera Names Index considers this name to be a synonym of Eutelia.

== Species ==
- Phalga clarirena (Sugi, 1982) Japan
- Phalga sinuosa Moore, 1881 north-eastern Himalayas, Thailand, Sundaland, Sulawesi
