= William Wing =

English painter

- Born: 1827; England
- Died: 9 January 1855 (aged 27–28); London, England
- Occupations: Entomologist, scientific illustrator and secretary of the Entomological Society of London

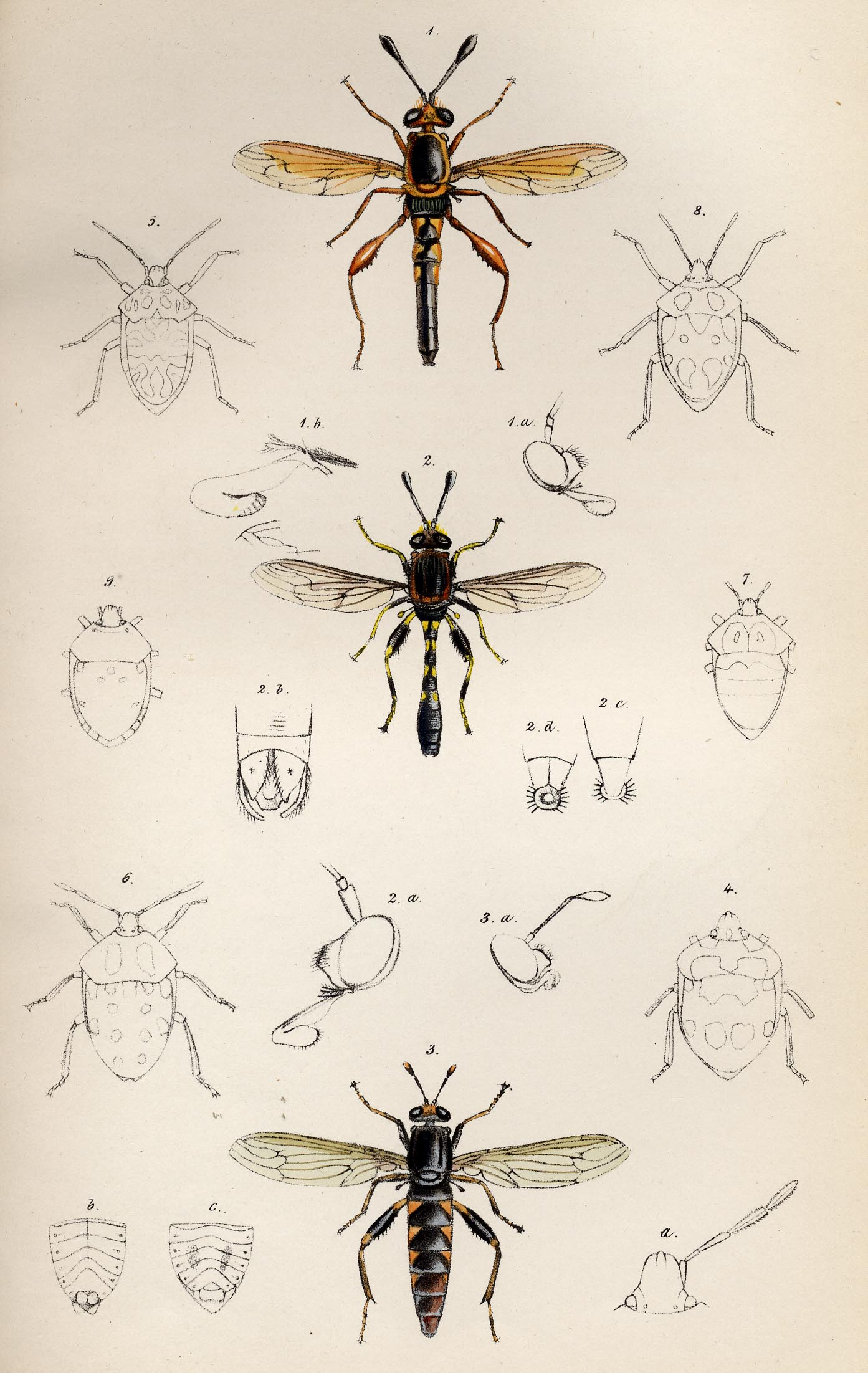
Plate by William Wing from Transactions of the Entomological Society for 1848 to illustrate "Descriptions of some new Species of Mydasidae from Western Australia" by John Obadiah Westwood

William Wing (1827 - 9 January 1855, London) was an English zoological illustrator and entomologist. He was a member of the Entomological Society of London from 1847 and in 1853-1854 assisted John William Douglas his role as minutes secretary.

Wing illustrated many zoological and entomological works including John MacGillivray's Narrative of the Voyage of HMS Rattlesnake (2 vols, Boone, London 1852), Synopsis of the Species of Whales and Dolphins in the Collection of the British Museum by John Edward Gray, The Natural History of the British Entomostraca by William Baird and lithography for Albany Hancock's illustrations for A Monograph of the British Nudibranchiate Mollusca.

A number of his watercolours of South Australian Lepidoptera are in the Art Gallery of South Australia.

In 1847 his address was 17, Priory Road, South Lambeth, London.
