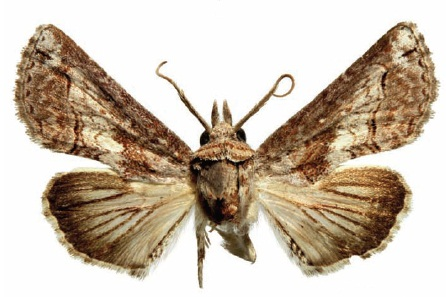
- Paectes tumida

Scientific classification
- Kingdom: Animalia
- Phylum: Arthropoda
- Clade: Pancrustacea
- Class: Insecta
- Order: Lepidoptera
- Superfamily: Noctuoidea
- Family: Euteliidae; Grote, 1882

= Euteliidae =

Family of moths

Euteliidae is a family of moths in the superfamily Noctuoidea. The family was erected by Augustus Radcliffe Grote in 1882.

== Genera ==
=== Euteliinae ===
- Anigraea Walker, 1862
- Anigraeopsis Warren, 1914
- Anuga Guenée, 1858
- Aplotelia Warren, 1914
- Atacira C. Swinhoe, 1900
- Caedesa Walker, 1862
- Caligatus Wing, 1850
- Chlumetia Walker, 1866
- Colpocheilopteryx Wallengren, 1865
- Erysthia Walker, 1862
- Eutelia Hübner, 1823
- Kobestelia Holloway, 1985
- Marathyssa Walker, 1865
- Paectes Hübner, 1818
- Parelia Berio, 1957
- Pataeta Walker, 1858
- Penicillaria Guenée, 1852
- Phalga Moore, 1881
- Targalla Walker, [1858]
- Thyriodes Guenée, 1852

=== Stictopterinae ===
- Aegilia Walker, 1857
- Diascoides Holloway, 1985
- Gyrtona Walker, 1863
- Lophoptera Guenée, 1852
- Nagara Walker, 1866
- Odontodes Guenée, 1852
- Savoca Walker, 1864
- Sigmuncus Holloway, 1985
- Stenosticta Hampson, 1912
- Stictoptera Guenée, 1852
