= List of moths of Réunion =

Location of Réunion

There are about 660 known moth species of Réunion. The moths (mostly nocturnal) and butterflies (mostly diurnal) together make up the taxonomic order Lepidoptera.

This is a list of moth species which have been recorded in Réunion, an island in the Indian Ocean.

== Arctiidae ==
- Argina amanda (Boisduval, 1847)
- Argina astrea (Drury, 1773)
- Eilema borbonica (Guillermet, 2011)
- Eilema francki (Guillermet, 2011)
- Eilema squalida (Guenée, 1862)
- Nyctemera insulare (Boisduval, 1833)
- Nyctemera virgo (Strand, 1909)
- Thumatha fuscescens Walker, 1866
- Utetheisa diva (Mabille, 1880)
- Utetheisa elata (Fabricius, 1798)
- Utetheisa lotrix (Cramer, 1779)
- Utetheisa pulchella (Linnaeus, 1758)
- Utetheisa pulchelloides Hampson, 1907

== Autostichidae ==
- Autosticha pelodes (Meyrick, 1883)

== Batrachedridae ==
- Batrachedra arenosella (Walker, 1864)
- Idioglossa bigemma Walsingham, 1881)

== Bedelliidae ==
- Bedellia somnulentella (Zeller, 1847)

== Blastobasidae ==
- Lateantenna inana (Butler, 1881)

== Carposinidae ==
- Peragrarchis martirea Bippus, 2016
- Peritrichocera barboniella Guillermet, 2012
- Peritrichocera bougreauella Guillermet, 2012
- Peritrichocera bipectinata Diakonoff, 1961
- Peritrichocera tsilaosa Diakonoff, 1961
- Scopalostoma melanoparea Diakonoff, 1957
- Scopalostoma nigromaculella Guillermet, 2004

== Choreutidae ==
- Anthophila emplecta (Turner, 1942)
- Brenthia leptocosma Meyrick, 1916
- Choreutis aegyptiaca (Zeller, 1867)
- Tebenna cornua Bippus, 2020
- Tebenna micalis (Mann, 1857)

== Copromorphidae ==
- Copromorpha mesobactris Meyrick, 1930

== Cosmopterigidae ==
- Calicotis attiei (Guillermet, 2011)
- Cosmopterix attenuatella Walker, 1864
- Anatrachyntis simplex (Walsingham, 1891)
- Eteobalea vinsoni (Viette, 1953)
- Macrobathra cineralella Viette, 1957

== Crambidae ==
=== Acentropinae ===
- Elophila acornutus Agassiz, 2012
- Elophila difflualis (Snellen, 1880)
- Elophila melagynalis Agassiz, 1978
- Eoophyla guillermetorum (Viette, 1988)
- Eoophyla reunionalis (Viette, 1988)
- Parapoynx diminutalis (Snellen, 1880)
- Parapoynx fluctuosalis (Zeller, 1852)
- Parapoynx ingridae Guillermet, 2004

=== Crambinae ===
- Angustalius hapaliscus (Zeller, 1852)
- Chilo sacchariphagus (Bojer, 1856)
- Conocramboides seychellellus (T. B. Fletcher, 1910)
- Culladia achroellum (Mabille, 1900)
- Microcrambon paphiellus (Guenée, 1862)

=== Cybalomiinae ===
- Trichophysetis preciosalis (Guillermet, 1996)

=== Evergestinae ===
- Crocidolomia pavonana (Fabricius, 1794)

=== Glaphyriinae ===
- Hellula undalis (Fabricius, 1781)
- Hydriris ornatalis (Duponchel, 1832)

=== Musotiminae ===
- Ambia gueneealis Viette, 1957
- Cilaus longinasus de Joannis, 1932
- Neurophyseta upupalis Guenée, 1862

=== Noordiinae ===
- Noorda blitealis Walker, 1859

=== Odontiinae ===
- Autocharis marginata Guillermet, 1996

=== Pyraustinae ===
- Achyra coelatalis (Walker, 1859)
- Euclasta whalleyi Popescu-Gorj & Constantinescu, 1973
- Hyalobathra filalis (Guenée, 1854)
- Ischnurges lancinalis (Guenée, 1854)
- Pagyda pulvereiumbralis (Hampson, 1918)
- Pyrausta phoenicealis (Hübner, 1818)
- Udea ferrugalis (Hübner, 1796)
- Uresiphita polygonalis ([Denis & Schiffermüller], 1775)

=== Scopariinae ===
- Scoparia benigna Meyrick, 1910
- Scoparia resinodes de Joannis, 1932

=== Spilomelinae ===
- Agathodes musivalis Guenée, 1854
- Bocchoris borbonensis Guillermet, 1996
- Bocchoris gueyraudi (Guillermet, 2004)
- Bocchoris inspersalis (Zeller, 1852)
- Botyodes asialis Guenée, 1854
- Bradina admixtalis (Walker, 1859)
- Cadarena pudoraria (Fabricius, 1781)
- Cirrhochrista etiennei (Viette, 1975)
- Cnaphalocrocis grucheti (Viette, 1975)
- Cnaphalocrocis poeyalis (Boisduval, 1833)
- Cnaphalocrocis trapezalis (Guenée, 1854)
- Cnaphalocrocis trebiusalis (Walker, 1859)
- Condylorrhiza zyphalis (Viette, 1958)
- Diaphana indica (Saunders, 1851)
- Diasemia monostigma Hampson, 1913
- Diasemiopsis ramburialis (Duponchel, 1834)
- Duponchelia fovealis Zeller, 1847
- Eurrhyparodes bracteolalis (Zeller, 1852)
- Eurrhyparodes tricoloralis (Zeller, 1852)
- Filodes costivitralis Guenée, 1862
- Ghesquierellana hirtusalis (Walker, 1859)
- Glyphodes cadeti Guillermet, 1996
- Glyphodes mascarenalis de Joannis, 1906
- Glyphodes shafferorum Viette, 1987
- Haritalodes derogata (Fabricius, 1775)
- Herpetogramma admensalis (Walker, 1859)
- Herpetogramma basalis (Walker, 1866)
- Herpetogramma brunnealis (Hampson, 1913)
- Herpetogramma couteyeni Guillermet, 2008
- Herpetogramma debressyi Guillermet, 2008
- Herpetogramma dorcalis (Guenée, 1862)
- Herpetogramma licarsisalis (Walker, 1859)
- Herpetogramma minoralis (Warren, 1892)
- Herpetogramma phaeopteralis (Guenée, 1854)
- Herpetogramma stultalis (Walker, 1859)
- Herpetogramma vacheri Guillermet, 2008
- Hodebertia testalis (Fabricius, 1794)
- Hymenia perspectalis (Hübner, 1796)
- Maruca vitrata (Fabricius, 1787)
- Mabra eryxalis (Walker, 1859)
- Nausinoe geometralis (Guenée, 1854)
- Nomophila noctuella ([Denis & Schiffermüller], 1775)
- Notarcha quaternalis (Zeller, 1852)
- Omiodes dnopheralis (Mabille, 1900)
- Omiodes indicata (Fabricius, 1775)
- Orphanostigma abruptalis (Walker, 1859)
- Palpita vitrealis (Hübner, 1796)
- Pardomima viettealis Martin, 1956
- Piletocera reunionalis Viette, 1957
- Piletocera viperalis (Guenée, 1862)
- Pleuroptya balteata (Fabricius, 1798)
- Pleuroptya violacealis Guillermet, 1996
- Poliobotys ablactalis (Walker, 1859)
- Prophantis smaragdina (Butler, 1875)
- Pyrausta childrenalis Boisduval, 1862
- Pyrausta pastrinalis Guenée, 1862
- Psara ferruginalis (Saalmüller, 1880)
- Salbia haemorrhoidalis (Guenée, 1854)
- Sameodes cancellalis (Zeller, 1852)
- Sceliodes laisalis (Walker, 1859)
- Spoladea recurvalis (Fabricius, 1775)
- Stemorrhages sericea (Drury, 1773)
- Syllepte albopunctum Guillermet, 1996
- Syllepte argillosa Guillermet, 1996
- Syllepte christophalis Viette, 1988
- Syllepte ovialis (Walker, 1859)
- Synclera traducalis (Zeller, 1852)
- Terastia subjectalis Lederer, 1863
- Thliptoceras longicornalis (Mabille, 1900)
- Zebronia phenice (Cramer, 1780)

== Elachistidae ==
- Chrysoclista hygrophilella Viette, 1957
- Ethmia nigroapicella (Saalmüller, 1880)

== Gelechiidae ==
- Anarsia citromitra Meyrick, 1921
- Anarsia dodonaea Bippus, 2020
- Anarsia tremata Bippus, 2020
- Anarsia vinsonella Viette, 1957
- Aristotelia bicomis Bippus, 2020
- Brachmia fuscogramma Janse, 1960
- Dactylethrella tetrametra (Meyrick, 1913)
- Dichomeris acuminata (Staudinger, 1876)
- Epiphractis amphitricha Meyrick, 1910
- Ephysteris subdiminutella (Stainton, 1867)
- Dichomeris ianthes (Meyrick, 1887)
- Faristenia tamarinda Bippus, 2020
- Helcystogramma convolvuli (Walsingham, 1907)
- Idiophantis croconota Meyrick, 1918
- Idiophantis valerieae Guillermet, 2010
- Leuronoma fauvella Viette, 1957
- Mesophleps palpigera (Walsingham, 1891)
- Mesophleps safranella (Legrand, 1965)
- Mesophleps silacella (Hübner, 1825)
- Phthorimaea operculella (Zeller, 1873)
- Sitotroga cerealella (Olivier, 1789)
- Sitotroga psacasta (Meyrick, 1908)
- Stegasta variana Meyrick, 1904
- Syncopacma leportensis Guillermet, 2013
- Syncopacma linella (Chrétien, 1908)
- Thiotricha tenuis (Walsingham, 1891)

== Geometridae ==
- Ascotis terebraria (Guenée, 1862)
- Asthenotricha lophopterata (Guenée, 1857)
- Asthenotricha tripogonias Prout, 1926
- Casuariclystis latifascia (Walker, 1866)
- Chiasmia crassilembaria (Mabille, 1880)
- Chlorerythra borbonica Guillermet, 2004
- Chloroclystis androgyna Herbulot, 1957
- Chloroclystis angelica Herbulot, 1968
- Chloroclystis costicavata de Joannis, 1932
- Chloroclystis derasata (Bastelberger, 1905)
- Chloroclystis exilipicta de Joannis, 1906
- Chloroclystis latifasciata de Joannis, 1932
- Cleora acaciaria (Boisduval, 1833)
- Collix inaequata Guenée, 1862
- Collix intrepida (Prout, 1932)
- Comostolopsis leuconeura Prout, 1930
- Conolophia conscitaria (Walker, 1861)
- Cyclophora lyciscaria (Guenée, 1857)
- Darisodes orygaria (Guenée, 1862)
- Dithecodes purpuraria de Joannis, 1932
- Ectropis distinctaria (de Joannis, 1915)
- Ectropis herbuloti Orhant, 2003
- Eois suarezensis Prout, 1923
- Erastria madecassaria (Boisduval, 1833)
- Eupithecia graphiticata de Joannis, 1932
- Gymnoscelis rubricata (de Joannis, 1932)
- Mesocolpia nanula (Mabille, 1900
- Mimandria diospyrata (Boisduval, 1833)
- Orthonama quadrisecta Herbulot, 1954
- Pingasa hypoleucaria (Guenée, 1862)
- Prasinocyma cellularia (Guenée, 1862)
- Psilocerea monochroma Herbulot, 1954
- Racotis incompletaria (Guenée, 1862)
- Rhodometra sacraria (Linnaeus, 1767)
- Scopula caesaria (Walker, 1861)
- Scopula internataria (Walker, 1861)
- Scopula lactaria (Walker, 1861)
- Scopula minorata (Boisduval, 1833)
- Scopula serena Prout, 1920
- Somatina lia Prout, 1915
- Thalassodes hyraria Guenée, 1857
- Thalassodes quadraria Guenée, 1857
- Traminda obversata (Walker, 1861)
- Xanthorhoe borbonicata (Guenée, 1858)
- Xanthorhoe magnata Herbulot, 1957

== Glyphipterigidae ==
- Chrysocentris costella Viette, 1957
- Chrysocentris ditiorana (Walker, 1863)

== Gracillariidae ==
- Acrocercops coffeifoliella (Motschulsky, 1859)
- Acrocercops macrochalca Meyrick, 1910
- Aristaea bathracma (Meyrick, 1912)
- Aristaea onychota (Meyrick, 1908)
- Aspilapteryx pentaplaca (Meyrick, 1911)
- Caloptilia xanthochiria Vari, 1961
- Callicercops triceros (Meyrick, 1926)
- Corythoxestis pentarcha (Meyrick, 1922)
- Dialectica geometra (Meyrick, 1916)
- Dialectica anselmella Guillermet, 2011
- Dialectica pyramidota (Meyrick, 1918)
- Phodoryctis caerulea (Meyrick, 1912)
- Phyllocnistis citrella Stainton, 1856
- Phyllocnistis saligna (Zeller, 1839)
- Spulerina hexalocha (Meyrick, 1912)
- Phyllonorycter ruizivorus de Prins, 2012

== Hyblaeidae ==
- Hyblaea apricans (Boisduval, 1833)

== Immidae ==
- Imma infima Meyrick, 1930

== Lymantriidae ==
- Euproctis annulipes (Boisduval, 1833)

== Lyonetiidae ==
- Leucoptera coffeella (Guérin-Méneville, 1842)
- Leucoptera meyricki Ghesquière, 1940
- Lyonetia hygrophilella (Viette, 1957)

== Noctuidae & Erebidae ==
- Achaea catella Guenée, 1852
- Achaea echo (Walker, 1858)
- Achaea euryplaga (Hampson, 1913)
- Achaea faber Holland, 1894
- Achaea finita (Guenée, 1852)
- Achaea infinita (Guenée, 1852)
- Achaea leucopasa (Walker, 1858)
- Achaea lienardi (Boisduval, 1833)
- Achaea oedipodina Mabille, 1879
- Achaea trapezoides (Guenée, 1862)
- Achaea violaceofascia (Saalmüller, 1891)
- Acontia luteola Saalmüller, 1891
- Agrapha etiennei (Dufay, 1975)
- Agrapha orbifer (Guenée, 1865)
- Agrotis alluaudi Viette, 1958
- Agrotis ipsilon (Hufnagel, 1766)
- Agrotis longidentifera (Hampson, 1903)
- Agrotis viettei Orhant, 2003
- Aletia decaryi (Boursin & Rungs, 1952)
- Aletia infrargyrea (Saalmüller, 1891)
- Aletia operosa (Saalmüller, 1891)
- Aletia pyrausta (Hampson, 1913)
- Ametropalpis nasuta Mabille, 1884
- Amyna acuta Berio, 1959
- Amyna axis Guenée, 1852
- Amyna incertalis (Guillermet, 1992)
- Anomis alluaudi Viette, 1965
- Anomis auragoides (Guenée, 1852)
- Anomis campanalis (Mabille, 1880)
- Anomis flava (Fabricius, 1775)
- Anomis lophognatha Hampson, 1926
- Anticarsia rubricans (Boisduval, 1833)
- Apamea desegaulxi Viette, 1982
- Apospasta rubiana (Guenée, 1862)
- Araeopteron legraini Bippus, 2018
- Araeopteron obliquifascia (de Joannis, 1910)
- Araeopteron papaziani Guillermet, 2009 *
- Argyrogramma signata (Fabricius, 1775)
- Argyrolopha costibarbata Hampson, 1914
- Arsina silenalis Guenée, 1862
- Asota borbonica (Boisduval, 1833)
- Athetis ignava (Guenée, 1852)
- Athetis pigra (Guenée, 1852)
- Autoba costimacula (Saalmüller, 1880)
- Brithys crini (Fabricius, 1775)
- Callixena versicolora Saalmüller, 1891
- Callopistria bernei Viette, 1985
- Callopistria cariei (de Joannis, 1915)
- Callopistria latreillei (Duponchel, 1827)
- Callopistria maillardi (Guenée, 1862)
- Callopistria yerburii Butler, 1884
- Catada obscura de Joannis, 1906
- Catephia squamosa (Wallengren, 1856)
- Chalciope delta (Boisduval, 1833)
- Chasmina tibialis Fabricius, 1775
- Chlumetia borbonica Guillermet, 1992
- Chrysodeixis chalcites (Esper, 1789)
- Condica conducta (Walker, 1857)
- Condica pauperata (Walker, 1858)
- Conservula cinisigna de Joannis, 1906
- Corgatha terracotta de Joannis, 1910
- Ctenoplusia dorfmeisteri (Felder & Rogenhofer, 1874)
- Ctenoplusia limbirena (Guenée, 1852)
- Cyligramma fluctuosa (Drury, 1773)
- Cyligramma limacina (Guérin-Méneville, 1832)
- Dichromia legrosi (Guillermet, 1992)
- Dysgonia angularis (Boisduval, 1833)
- Dysgonia derogans (Walker, 1858)
- Dysgonia masama (Griveaud, 1981)
- Dysgonia torrida (Guenée, 1852)
- Erebus walkeri (Butler, 1875)
- Ericeia albangula (Saalmüller, 1880)
- Ericeia congregata (Walker, 1858)
- Ericeia congressa (Walker, 1858)
- Ericeia inangulata (Guenée, 1852)
- Ericeia lituraria (Saalmüller, 1880)
- Eublemma anachoresis (Wallengren, 1863)
- Eublemma augusta (Guenée, 1862)
- Eublemma baccalix (Swinhoe, 1886)
- Eublemma cochylioides (Guenée, 1852)
- Eublemma pyrosticta de Joannis, 1910
- Eublemma viettei (Berio, 1954)
- Eublemmoides apicimacula (Mabille, 1880)
- Eudocima fullonia (Clerck, 1764)
- Eudocima imperator (Guérin-Méneville, 1832)
- Euplexia borbonica Viette, 1957
- Eustrotia bernica Viette, 1957
- Eutelia blandiatrix (Guenée, 1852)
- Feliniopsis tenera (Viette, 1963)
- Gesonia obeditalis Walker, 1859
- Gesonia stictigramma Hampson, 1926
- Gracilodes angulalis Guillermet, 1992
- Gracilodes nysa Guenée, 1852
- Grammodes bifasciata (Petagna, 1787)
- Grammodes stolida (Fabricius, 1775)
- Gyrtona polymorpha Hampson, 1905
- Helicoverpa armigera (Hübner, [1808])
- Heliophisma klugii (Boisduval, 1833)
- Hipoepa fractalis (Guénée, 1854)
- Holocryptis interrogationis Viette, 1957
- Hydrillodes aviculalis Guenée, 1862
- Hydrillodes uliginosalis Guenée, 1854
- Hypena anderesi Guillermet, 1992
- Hypena conscitalis Walker, 1866
- Hypena etiennei Guillermet, 1992
- Hypena frappieralis Guenée, 1862
- Hypena inextensalis Guenée, 1862
- Hypena laceratalis Walker, 1859
- Hypena nasutalis Guenée, 1862
- Hypena obacerralis Walker, [1859]
- Hypena ophiusinalis Mabille, 1879
- Hypena polycyma Hampson, 1902
- Hypena varialis Walker, 1866
- Hypena viettei Guillermet, 1992
- Hypocala florens Mabille, 1879
- Hypospila thermesina Guenée, 1862
- Janseodes melanospila (Guenée, 1852)
- Lacera alope (Cramer, 1780)
- Lacera noctilio (Fabricius, 1794)
- Leucania hypocapna (de Joannis, 1932)
- Leucania insulicola Guenée, 1852
- Leucania nebulosa Hampson, 1902
- Leucania phaea Hampson, 1902
- Leucania prominens (Walker, 1856)
- Leucania pseudoloreyi (Rungs, 1953)
- Lithacodia blandula (Guenée, 1862)
- Lophoptera litigiosa (Boisduval, 1833)
- Lophoruza mascarena de Joannis, 1910
- Luceria amazonensis Guillermet, 2006
- Lygephila salax (Guenée, 1852)
- Matarum etiennei Viette, 1975
- Maxera marchalii (Boisduval, 1833)
- Megalonycta mediovitta (Rothschild, 1924)
- Mentaxya palmistarum (de Joannis, 1932)
- Mocis conveniens (Walker, 1858)
- Mocis frugalis (Fabricius, 1775)
- Mocis mayeri (Boisduval, 1833)
- Mocis proverai Zilli, 2000
- Mocis repanda (Fabricius, 1794)
- Mythimna borbonensis Guillermet, 1996
- Neostichtis ignorata Viette, 1958
- Nodaria cornicalis (Fabricius, 1794)
- Nodaria mouriesi Guillermet, 2004
- Ochropleura leucogaster (Freyer, 1831)
- Ochropleura megaplecta (de Joannis, 1932)
- Oedebasis longipalpis (Berio, 1959)
- Oedebasis ovipennis Hampson, 1902
- Ophiusa legendrei Viette, 1967
- Oraesia pierronii (Mabille, 1880)
- Oruza divisa (Walker, 1862)
- Ozarba perplexa Saalmüller, 1891
- Ozopteryx basalis Saalmüller, 1891
- Pandesma muricolor Berio, 1966
- Panilla aviakala (Bippus, 2018)
- Paracolax tripunctum Bippus, 2018
- Pericyma mendax (Walker, 1858)
- Pericyma vinsonii (Guenée, 1862)
- Physula synnaralis Guenée, 1862
- Pleuronodes apicalis Guillermet, 1992
- Plusiodonta excavata (Guenée, 1862)
- Plusiodonta gueneei (Viette, 1968)
- Polydesma umbricola Boisduval, 1833
- Progonia matilei Orhant, 2001
- Progonia oileusalis (Walker, 1859)
- Proluta deflexa Saalmüller, 1891
- Prominea porrecta (Saalmüller, 1880)
- Radara subcupralis Walker, [1866]
- Rhesala moestalis (Walker, 1866)
- Rhynchina revolutalis (Zeller, 1852)
- Rivula dimorpha Fryer, 1912
- Rivula dispar de Joannis, 1915
- Serrodes partita (Fabricius, 1775)
- Serrodes trispila (Mabille, 1890)
- Sesamia calamistis Hampson, 1910
- Simplicia extinctalis (Zeller, 1852)
- Simplicia fesseleti Guillermet, 2005
- Simplicia inflexalis Guenée, 1854
- Simplicia pannalis Guenée, 1862
- Spodoptera cilium Guenée, 1852
- Spodoptera exigua (Hübner, 1808)
- Spodoptera littoralis (Boisduval, 1833)
- Spodoptera mauritia (Boisduval, 1833)
- Stenhypena borbonica Guillermet, 2005
- Stictoptera antemarginata Saalmüller, 1880
- Stictoptera poecilosoma Saalmüller, 1880
- Syngrapha grosmornensis Guillermet, 2000
- Thyas rubricata (Holland, 1894)
- Thysanoplusia indicator (Walker, [1858])
- Tolna sypnoides (Butler, 1878)
- Trichoplusia florina (Guenée, 1852)
- Trichoplusia ni (Hübner, [1803])
- Trichoplusia orichalcea (Fabricius, 1775)
- Trigonodes exportata Guenée, 1852
- Trigonodes hyppasia (Cramer, 1779)
- Vietteania torrentium (Guenée, 1852)
- Vittaplusia vittata (Wallengren, 1856)

== Nolidae ==
- Blenina richardi Viette, 1958
- Earias biplaga Walker, 1866
- Earias insulana (Boisduval, 1833)
- Garella basalis Berio, 1966
- Maceda mansueta Walker, 1858
- Maurilia arcuata (Walker, [1858])
- Nola borbonica Guillermet, 2005
- Nola denauxi Orhant, 2003
- Nola guillermeti Orhant, 2003
- Nola herbuloti Toulgoët, 1982
- Nola melanoscelis (Hampson, 1914)
- Nycteola mauritia (de Joannis, 1906)
- Pardasena virgulana (Mabille, 1880)
- Pardoxia graellsii (Feisthamel, 1837)
- Xanthodes albago (Fabricius, 1794)

== Oecophoridae ==
- Ancylometis ansarti Guillermet, 2010
- Ancylometis celineae Guillermet, 2010
- Ancylometis lavergnella Guillermet, 2011
- Ancylometis mulaella Guillermet, 2011
- Ancylometis paulianella Viette, 1957
- Ancylometis ribesae Viette, 1996
- Ancylometis scaeocosma Meyrick, 1887
- Cenarchis vesana Meyrick, 1924
- Endrosis sarcitrella (Linnaeus, 1758)
- Epiphractis amphitricha Meyrick, 1910
- Epiphractis tryphoxantha Meyrick, 1930
- Metachanda astrapias (Meyrick, 1887)
- Metachanda anomalella Viette, 1957
- Metachanda borbonicella Viette, 1957
- Metachanda cafrerella Viette, 1957
- Metachanda eucyrtella Viette, 1957
- Metachanda hamonella Viette, 1954
- Metachanda hugotella Viette, 1957
- Metachanda lucasi Guillermet, 2010
- Metachanda nigromaculella Viette, 1957
- Metachanda reunionella Viette, 1957
- Metantithyra silvestrella Viette, 1957
- Metachanda thaleropis Meyrick, 1911
- Orygocera anderesi Viette, 1991
- Oxycrates reunionella Guillermet, 2011
- Semnocosma gibeauxella Viette, 1995
- Taragmarcha borbonensis Viette, 1957
- Tanychastis moreauella Guillermet, 2011

== Plutellidae ==
- Plutella xylostella (Linnaeus, 1758)

== Praydidae ==
- Prays armynoti Bippus, 2020
- Prays citri (Millière, 1873)
- Prays sublevatella Viette, 1957

== Pterophoridae ==
=== Pterophorinae ===
- Megalorhipida tessmanni (Strand, 1912)
- Bipunctiphorus dimorpha (T. B. Fletcher, 1910)
- Exelastis phlyctaenias (Meyrick, 1911)
- Hellinsia madecasseus (Bigot, 1964)
- Hepalastis pumilio (Zeller, 1873)
- Lantanophaga pusillidactylus (Walker, 1864)
- Megalorhipida leptomeres (Meyrick, 1886)
- Megalorhipida leucodactyla (Fabricius, 1794)
- Megalorhipida monsa (Bippus, 2020)
- Oidaematophorus borbonicus (Gibeaux, 1991)
- Platyptilia fulva Bigot, 1964
- Platyptilia grisea Gibeaux, 1994
- Platyptilia pseudofulva Gibeaux, 1994
- Pterophorus albidus (Zeller, 1852)
- Sphenarches anisodactylus (Walker, 1864)
- Stenodacma wahlbergi (Zeller, 1852)
- Stenoptilodes taprobanes (Felder & Rogenhofer, 1875)
- Vietteilus borbonica (Viette, 1957)

=== Ochyroticinae ===
- Ochyrotica rufa Arenberger, 1987

== Pyralidae ==
=== Galleriinae ===
- Achroia grisella (Fabricius, 1794)
- Corcyra cephalonica (Stainton, 1866)
- Galleria mellonella (Linnaeus, 1758)
- Lamoria clathrella (Ragonot, 1888)

=== Epipaschiinae ===
- Epilepia melapastalis (Hampson, 1906)

=== Chrysauginae ===
- Parachma lequettealis (Guillermet, 2011)

=== Pyralinae ===
- Hypsopygia mauritialis (Boisduval, 1833)
- Hypotia saramitoi (Guillermet, 1996)
- Ocrasa nostralis (Guenée, 1854)
- Pyralis manihotalis Guenée, 1854
- Pyralis pictalis (Curtis, 1834)

=== Phycitinae ===
- Apomyelois ceratoniae (Zeller, 1839)
- Balinskyia monstrosa (Balinsky, 1994)
- Cactoblastis cactorum (Berg, 1885)
- Cadra cautella (Walker, 1863)
- Ceutholopha isidis (Zeller, 1867
- Candiopella reunionalis Guillermet, 2007
- Cryptoblabes bistriga (Haworth, 1811)
- Cryptoblabes gnidiella (Millière, 1867)
- Ephestia callidella Guenée, 1845
- Epischnia beharella (Viette, 1964)
- Etiella zinckenella (Treitschke, 1832)
- Flabellobasis capensis (Hampson, 1901)
- Maliarpha separatella vectiferella (Ragonot, 1901)
- Hypargyria metalliferella Ragonot, 1888
- Morgabinella billii Guillermet, 2007
- Morosaphycita morosalis (Saalmüller, 1880)
- Oncocera quilicii Guilletmet, 2007
- Pempelia strophocomma (de Joannis, 1932)
- Philotroctis pectinicornella (Hampson, 1896)
- Phycita demidovi Guillermet, 2007
- Phycita diaphana (Staudinger, 1870)
- Phycita irisella (Guenée, 1862) *
- Plodia interpunctella (Hübner, [1813])
- Pseudoceroprepes semipectinella (Guenée, 1862)
- Pseudophycitatella leveuleuxi Guillermet, 2007
- Selagiaforma vercambrensis Guillermet, 2007
- Spatulipalpia pectinatella de Joannis, 1915
- Thylacoptila borbonica Guillermet, 2007
- Thylacoptila paurosema Meyrick, 1888

== Sphingidae ==
- Acherontia atropos (Linnaeus, 1758)
- Agrius convolvuli (Linnaeus, 1758)
- Basiothia medea (Fabricius, 1781)
- Cephonodes apus (Boisduval, 1833)
- Coelonia fulvinotata (Butler, 1875)
- Coelonia solani (Boisduval, 1833)
- Daphnis nerii (Linnaeus, 1758)
- Euchloron megaera (Linnaeus, 1758)
- Hippotion celerio (Linnaeus, 1758)
- Hippotion eson (Cramer, 1779)
- Hippotion gracilis (Butler, 1875)
- Hyles biguttata (Walker, 1856)
- Macroglossum aesalon Mabille, 1879
- Macroglossum milvus (Boisduval, 1833)
- Macroglossum soror Rothschild & Jordan, 1903
- Nephele densoi (Keferstein, 1870)
- Nephele oenopion (Hübner, [1824])

== Stathmopodidae ==
- Calicotis attiei (Guillermet, 2011)
- Stathmopoda margabim Viette, 1995

== Thyrididae ==
- Banisia clathrula (Guenée, 1877)

== Tineidae ==
- Agnathosia nana Bippus, 2020
- Amphixystis aromaticella (Viette, 1957)
- Amphixystis fragosa (Meyrick, 1910)
- Amphixystis guttata Bippus, 2020
- Amphixystis maillardella (Viette, 1957)
- Amphixystis paroditella (Viette, 1957)
- Amphixystis patelia Bippus, 2020
- Amphixystis siccata Meyrick, 1910
- Amphixystis serrata Meyrick, 1914
- Amphixystis syntricha Meyrick, 1910
- Dasyses langenieri Guillermet, 2009
- Erechthias nigrocaputis Bippus, 2020
- Erechthias nigromaculella Guillermet, 2009
- Erechthias richardella Viette, 1957
- Erechthias zebrina Butler
- Eudarcia oceanica Bippus, 2020
- Opogona dimidiatella Zeller, 1853
- Opogona etiennella Viette, 1988
- Opogona heroicella Viette, 1957
- Opogona incorrectella Viette, 1957
- Opogona omoscopa (Meyrick, 1893)
- Opogona phaeochalca Meyrick, 1908
- Opogona sacchari (Bojer, 1856)
- Opogona salamolardella Guillermet, 2011
- Opogona sycastella Viette, 1957
- Opogona transversata Bippus, 2016
- Phereoeca praecox Gozmány & Vári, 1973
- Praeacedes atomosella (Walker, 1863)
- Protaphreutis borboniella (Boisduval, 1833)
- Setomorpha rutella Zeller, 1852
- Tineovertex flavilineata Bippus, 2016
- Tiquadra etiennei Viette, 1988
- Tiquadra guillermeti Viette, 1988
- Tiquadra seraphinei Guillermet, 2009
- Tiquadra trancarti Guillermet, 2009

== Tortricidae ==
- Adoxophyes microptycha Diakonoff, 1957
- Apotoforma smaragdina Bippus, 2020
- Bactra crithopa Diakonoff, 1957
- Bactra pallidior Razowski, 2015
- Bactra stagnicolana Zeller, 1852
- Borboniella allomorpha (Meyrick, 1922)
- Borboniella bifracta Diakonoff, 1957
- Borboniella chrysorrhoea Diakonoff, 1957
- Borboniella conflatilis Diakonoff, 1977
- Borboniella cubophora Diakonoff, 1957
- Borboniella gigantella Guillermet, 2004
- Borboniella leucaspis Diakonoff, 1957
- Borboniella marmaromorpha Diakonoff, 1957
- Borboniella montana Diakonoff, 1957
- Borboniella octops Diakonoff, 1957
- Borboniella pelecys Diakonoff, 1957
- Borboniella peruella Guillermet, 2012
- Borboniella rougonella Guillermet, 2012
- Borboniella spudaea Diakonoff, 1957
- Borboniella striatella Guillermet, 2012
- Borboniella tekayaella Guillermet, 2013
- Borboniella viettei Diakonoff, 1957
- Borboniella vulpicolor Diakonoff, 1957
- Brachiolia amblopis Meyrick, 1911
- Brachiolia egenella (Walker, 1864)
- Clepsis tetraplegma (Diakonoff, 1957)
- Coniostola stereoma (Meyrick, 1912)
- Cosmetra anthophaga Diakonoff, 1977
- Cosmetra spiculifera (Meyrick, 1913)
- Cosmorrhyncha acrocosma (Meyrick, 1908)
- Cosmorrhyncha ocellata (Mabille, 1900)
- Crocidosema affouchensis Guillermet, 2012
- Crocidosema lantana Busck, 1910
- Crocidosema plebejana Zeller, 1847
- Cryptophlebia carreella Guillermet, 2013
- Cryptophlebia colasi Guillermet, 2006
- Cryptophlebia gomyi Guillermet, 2004
- Cryptophlebia peltastica (Meyrick, 1921)
- Cryptophlebia semilunana (Saalmüller, 1880)
- Cydia corona Bippus, 2020
- Cydia siderocosma (Diakonoff, 1969)
- Cydia undosa (Diakonoff, 1957)
- Dudua aprobola (Meyrick, 1886)
- Eccopsis incultana (Walker, 1863)
- Eccopsis praecedens Walsingham, 1897
- Epichoristodes acerbella D (Walker, 1864)
- Episimoides erythraea Diakonoff, 1957
- Grapholita siderocosma Diakonoff, 1978
- Hilarographa vinsonella Guillermet, 2013
- Leguminivora anthracotis (Meyrick, 1913)
- Leguminivora ptychora (Meyrick, 1907)
- Lobesia aeolopa Meyrick, 1907
- Lobesia crithopa Diakonoff, 1957
- Lobesia rapta Diakonoff, 1957
- Lobesia vanillana (de Joannis, 1900)
- Microsarotis lygistis (Diakonoff, 1977)
- Pandemis electrochroa (Diakonoff, 1977)
- Strepsicrates penechra (Diakonoff, 1989)
- Tetramoera isogramma (Meyrick, 1908)
- Tetramoera schistaceana (Snellen, 1891)
- Thaumatotibia ecnomia (Diakonoff, 1974)
- Thaumatotibia etiennei (Diakonoff, 1974)
- Thaumatotibia eutacta (Diakonoff, 1988)
- Thaumatotibia leucotreta (Meyrick, 1913)
- Thaumatotibia rassembi Bippus, 2020
- Thaumatotibia rochata Bippus, 2020
- Trymalitis scalifera Meyrick, 1912

== Uraniidae ==
- Dirades dadanti (Viette, 1975)
- Dirades etiennei Boudinot, 1982
- Dirades theclata (Guenée, 1858)

== Yponomeutidae ==
- Kessleria gibeauxia Bippus, 2020
- Xyrosaris canusa Bippus, 2020
