= Ancylometis isophaula =

Scientific classification
- Kingdom: Animalia
- Phylum: Arthropoda
- Class: Insecta
- Order: Lepidoptera
- Family: Oecophoridae
- Genus: Ancylometis
- Species: A. isophaula

Binomial name
- Ancylometis isophaula Meyrick, 1934

Species of moth

Ancylometis isophaula is a species of moth in the family Oecophoridae. It is known from Madagascar.

This species has a wingspan of 10 mm for the male.

This species is allied to Ancylometis scaeocosma.
