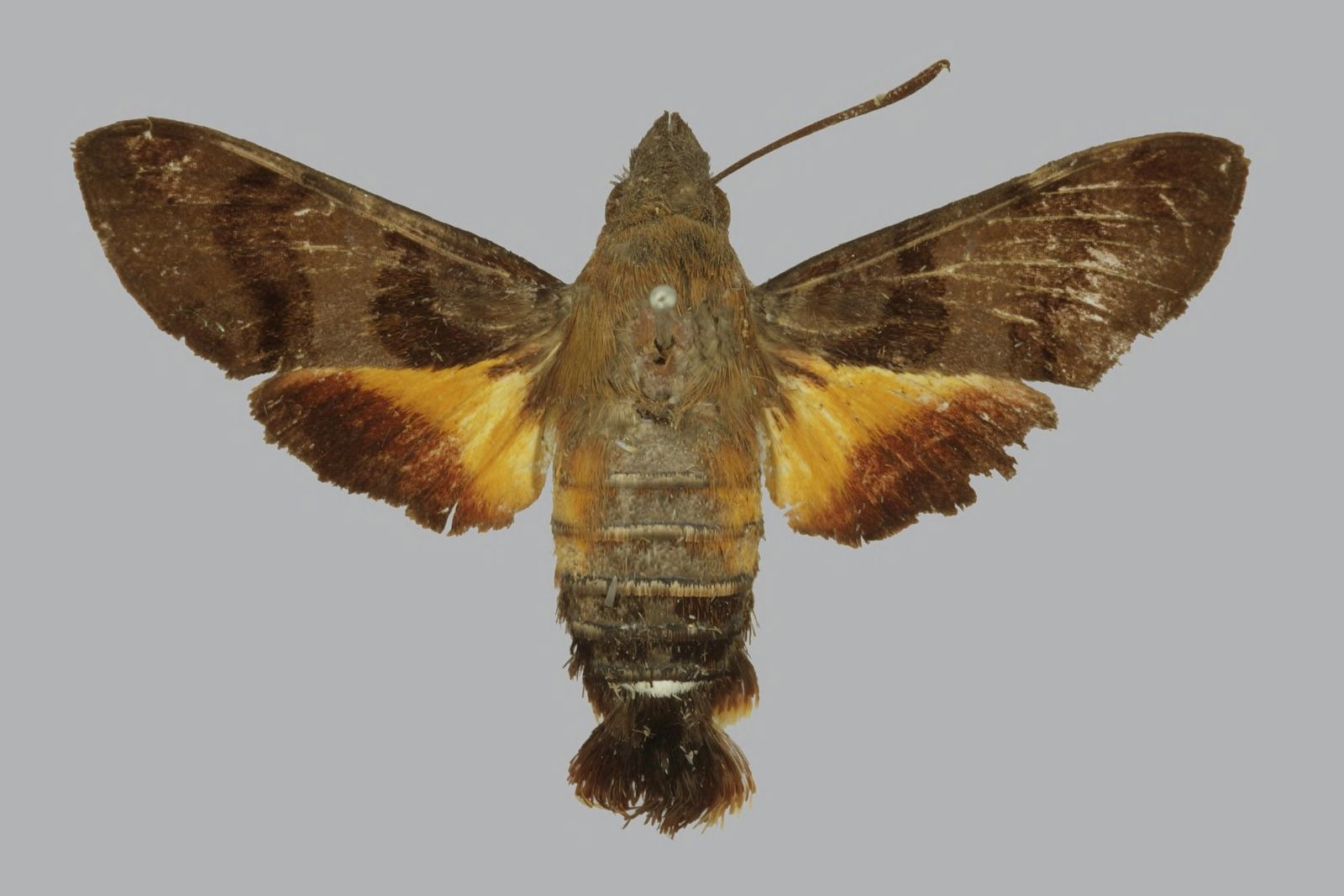

Scientific classification
- Kingdom: Animalia
- Phylum: Arthropoda
- Class: Insecta
- Order: Lepidoptera
- Family: Sphingidae
- Genus: Macroglossum
- Species: M. pachycerus

Binomial name
- Macroglossum pachycerus Rothschild & Jordan, 1903

= Macroglossum pachycerus =

Species of moth

Macroglossum pachycerus is a moth of the family Sphingidae. It is known from Madagascar.

It is similar to Macroglossum aesalon.
