= Collix inaequata =

Scientific classification
- Kingdom: Animalia
- Phylum: Arthropoda
- Class: Insecta
- Order: Lepidoptera
- Family: Geometridae
- Genus: Collix
- Species: C. inaequata

Binomial name
- Collix inaequata Guenée, 1862

Species of moth

Collix inaequata is a moth of the family Geometridae. This moth is endemic in La Réunion where it is found in medium altitudes.

A known foodplant of the larvae is Badula barthesia, an endemic Myrsinaceae. The larvae are green with some pink colorations.

== See also ==
- List of moths of Réunion
