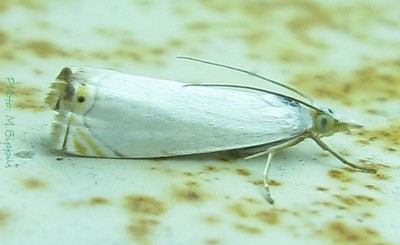

Scientific classification
- Kingdom: Animalia
- Phylum: Arthropoda
- Clade: Pancrustacea
- Class: Insecta
- Order: Lepidoptera
- Family: Crambidae
- Subfamily: Crambinae
- Tribe: Crambini
- Genus: Microcrambon; Błeszyński, 1970
- Species: M. paphiellus

Binomial name
- Microcrambon paphiellus (Guenée, 1862)

Synonyms
- Microcrambon auronivellus (Fryer, 1912)

= Microcrambon =

Genus of moths

Microcrambon is a monotypic moth genus of the family Crambidae described by Stanisław Błeszyński in 1970. Its single species, Microcrambon paphiellus, described by Achille Guenée in 1862, is endemic to Réunion and Seychelles.

== See also ==
- List of moths of Réunion
