= Leuronoma zymotis =

Scientific classification
- Kingdom: Animalia
- Phylum: Arthropoda
- Class: Insecta
- Order: Lepidoptera
- Family: Gelechiidae
- Genus: Leuronoma
- Species: L. zymotis

Binomial name
- Leuronoma zymotis (Meyrick, 1909)

Synonyms
- Telphusa zymotis Meyrick, 1909

Species of moth

Leuronoma zymotis is a moth of the family Gelechiidae. It was described by Edward Meyrick in 1909. It is found in South Africa.

The wingspan is usually around 15 mm. The forewings are fuscous irregularly mixed with ferruginous brownish and sprinkled with dark fuscous and with a blackish mark beneath the base of the costa, and one on the fold towards the base, each followed by longitudinal white-ochreous suffusion, the latter streak extending to the second discal. There are suffused white-ochreous oblique costal and dorsal opposite marks about three-fourths, not meeting. The hindwings are grey.
