= Epiphractis phoenicis =

Scientific classification
- Kingdom: Animalia
- Phylum: Arthropoda
- Class: Insecta
- Order: Lepidoptera
- Family: Oecophoridae
- Genus: Epiphractis
- Species: E. phoenicis

Binomial name
- Epiphractis phoenicis Meyrick, 1908

Species of moth

Epiphractis phoenicis is a moth of the family Oecophoridae. This species was described from a specimen from Bihé in central Angola.

The wingspan of the females is about 23 mm. Head and thorax are light rosy-ochreous, forewings elongate and dilated posteriorly, ochreous-crimson. Deeper purplish-crimson towards dorsum, lighter and more ochreous towards costa. The costal edge is whitish. The hindwings are grey.
