= Epiphractis crocoplecta =

Scientific classification
- Kingdom: Animalia
- Phylum: Arthropoda
- Class: Insecta
- Order: Lepidoptera
- Family: Oecophoridae
- Genus: Epiphractis
- Species: E. crocoplecta

Binomial name
- Epiphractis crocoplecta Meyrick, 1913

Species of moth

Epiphractis crocoplecta is a species of moth of the family Oecophoridae first described by Edward Meyrick in 1913. This species was described from a specimen from Three Sisters in South Africa.

The wingspan of the females is about 15 mm. The head is pale yellowish, suffused with brown reddish on the sides. The forewings are elongate, the costa moderately arched, dull crimson purplish with the costal edge grey. There is a patch of ochreous suffusion along the basal two-fifths of the dorsum and an inwardly oblique yellow streak from the dorsum behind the middle reaching more than half across the wing, edged anteriorly with deep ferruginous. A short inwardly oblique slender yellow streak is found from the tornus, and there is a furruginous-brown transverse dot above the apex of this representing the second discal stigma. The hindwings are grey, paler towards the base.
