= Pseudoceroprepes =

Scientific classification
- Domain: Eukaryota
- Kingdom: Animalia
- Phylum: Arthropoda
- Class: Insecta
- Order: Lepidoptera
- Family: Pyralidae
- Tribe: Phycitini
- Genus: Pseudoceroprepes; Roesler, 1982

Genus of moths

Pseudoceroprepes is a genus of snout moths described by Rolf-Ulrich Roesler in 1982.

== Species ==
- Pseudoceroprepes nosivolella (Viette, 1964) - (Madagascar, Nigeria, Kenya)
- Pseudoceroprepes piratis (Meyrick, 1887) - (Australia, Papua New Guinea)
- Pseudoceroprepes semipectinella (Guenée, 1862) - (Réunion)
