= Oedebasis =

Scientific classification
- Kingdom: Animalia
- Phylum: Arthropoda
- Class: Insecta
- Order: Lepidoptera
- Superfamily: Noctuoidea
- Family: Erebidae
- Subfamily: Calpinae
- Genus: Oedebasis; Hampson, 1902

Genus of moths

Oedebasis is a genus of moths of the family Erebidae. The genus was erected by George Hampson in 1902.

== Species ==
- Oedebasis longipalpis (Berio, 1959)
- Oedebasis mutilata (Berio, 1966)
- Oedebasis ovipennis Hampson, 1902
- Oedebasis regularis Viette, 1971
