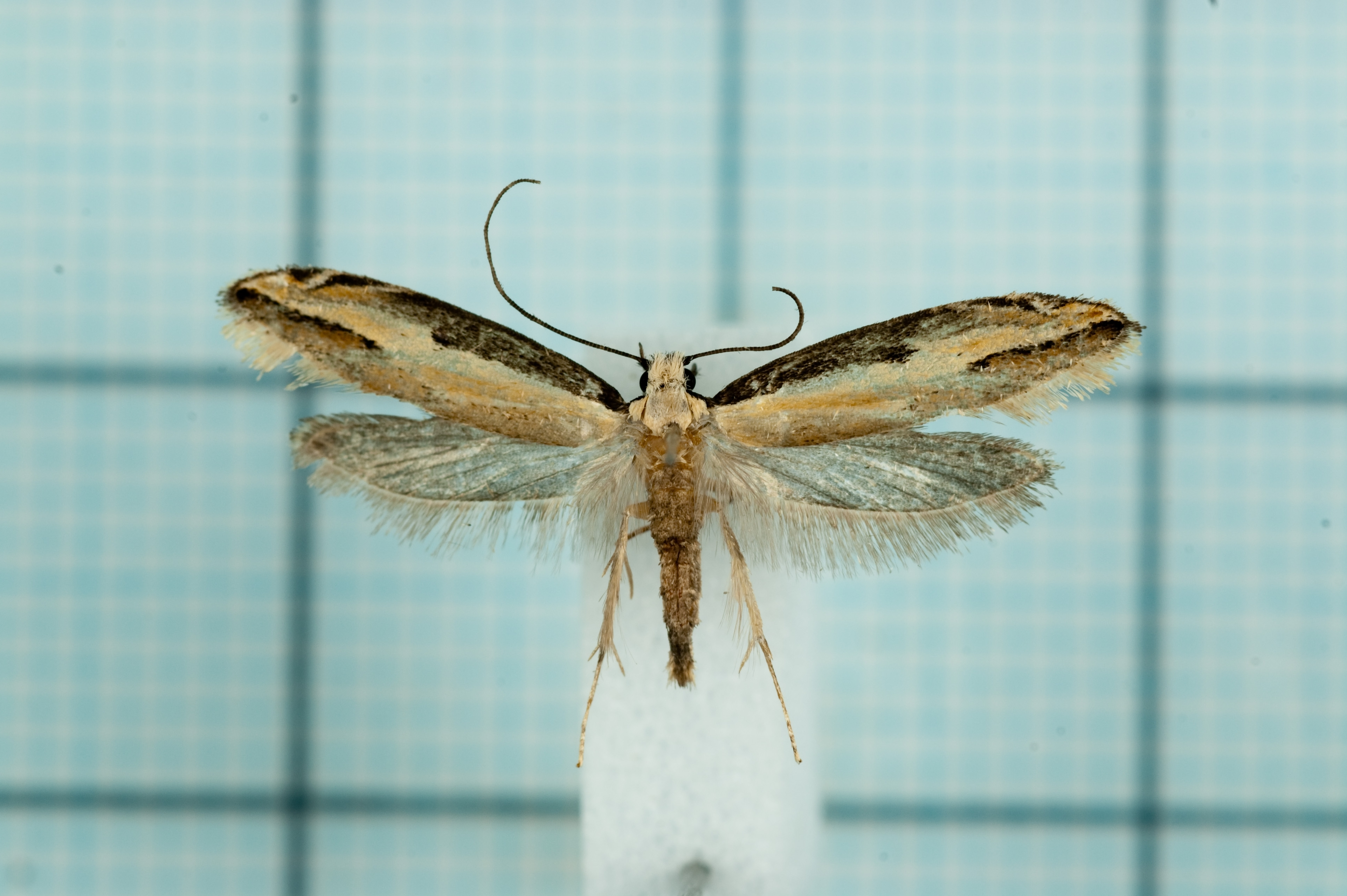
- Tineovertex melanochrysus

Scientific classification
- Kingdom: Animalia
- Phylum: Arthropoda
- Clade: Pancrustacea
- Class: Insecta
- Order: Lepidoptera
- Superfamily: Tineoidea
- Family: Tineidae
- Genus: Tineovertex; Moriuti, 1982

= Tineovertex =

Genus of moths

Tineovertex is a genus of moths belonging to the family Tineidae.

== Species ==
Tineovertex contains the following species:

- Tineovertex antidroma (Meyrick, 1931)
- Tineovertex canicoma (Meyrick, 1911)
- Tineovertex elongata Huang, Hirowatari & Wang, 2011
- Tineovertex expansa Huang, Hirowatari & Wang, 2011
- Tineovertex fibriformis Huang, Hirowatari & Wang, 2011
- Tineovertex flavilineata Bippus, 2016
- Tineovertex gladiata Huang, Hirowatari & Wang, 2007
- Tineovertex hamoides Huang, Hirowatari, Wang, 2011
- Tineovertex melanochrysa (Meyrick, 1911)
- Tineovertex melliflua (Meyrick, 1911)
- Tineovertex sartoria (Meyrick, 1911)
- Tineovertex thailandia Huang, Hirowatari & Wang, 2011
