= Leuronoma oenochyta =

Scientific classification
- Kingdom: Animalia
- Phylum: Arthropoda
- Class: Insecta
- Order: Lepidoptera
- Family: Gelechiidae
- Genus: Leuronoma
- Species: L. oenochyta

Binomial name
- Leuronoma oenochyta (Meyrick, 1921)

Synonyms
- Acompsia oenochyta Meyrick, 1921

Species of moth

Leuronoma oenochyta is a moth of the family Gelechiidae. It was described by Edward Meyrick in 1921. It is found in Zimbabwe and Namibia.

The wingspan is about 14 mm. The forewings are dull rosy purplish irrorated (sprinkled) with dark fuscous and with a blackish subcostal dash from the base followed by a yellow-ochreous elongate mark. There is a yellow-ochreous streak along the fold from the base to beyond the plical stigma, interrupted by a blackish elongate spot midway between the plical stigma and the base, and by the plical stigma. The stigmata are moderately large and blackish, the plical obliquely before the first discal, the discal interrupting a yellow-ochreous longitudinal streak beginning some little way before the first and extending to just beyond the second. There are opposite cloudy yellow-ochreous spots at three-fourths of the costa and tornus and a small ochreous-yellow apical spot, as well as one on the termen beneath it. The hindwings are grey.
