= Ancylometis lavergnella =

Scientific classification
- Kingdom: Animalia
- Phylum: Arthropoda
- Clade: Pancrustacea
- Class: Insecta
- Order: Lepidoptera
- Family: Oecophoridae
- Genus: Ancylometis
- Species: A. lavergnella

Binomial name
- Ancylometis lavergnella Guillermet, 2011

Species of moth

Ancylometis lavergnella is a species of moth in the family Oecophoridae. It is endemic to Réunion.

== See also ==
- List of moths of Réunion
