= Protaphreutis =

Scientific classification
- Kingdom: Animalia
- Phylum: Arthropoda
- Clade: Pancrustacea
- Class: Insecta
- Order: Lepidoptera
- Family: Tineidae
- Genus: Protaphreutis; Meyrick, 1922

Type species
- Tinea acquisitella Walker, 1863

Genus of moths

Protaphreutis is a genus of moths belonging to the family Tineidae.

== Species ==
- Protaphreutis antipyla Meyrick, 1930
- Protaphreutis acquisitella (Walker, 1863)
- Protaphreutis borboniella (Boisduval, 1833)
- Protaphreutis brasmatias Meyrick, 1930
- Protaphreutis cubitalis (Meyrick, 1910)
- Protaphreutis leucopsamma Meyrick, 1930
- Protaphreutis pagetodes (Meyrick, 1911)
- Protaphreutis sauroderma Meyrick, 1930
