= Mimandria recognita =

Scientific classification
- Kingdom: Animalia
- Phylum: Arthropoda
- Clade: Pancrustacea
- Class: Insecta
- Order: Lepidoptera
- Family: Geometridae
- Genus: Mimandria
- Species: M. recognita

Binomial name
- Mimandria recognita (Saalmüller, 1891)

Synonyms
- Hypochroma recognita Saalmüller, 1891

Species of moth

Mimandria recognita is a moth of the family Geometridae first described by Max Saalmüller in 1891. It is found on Madagascar.
