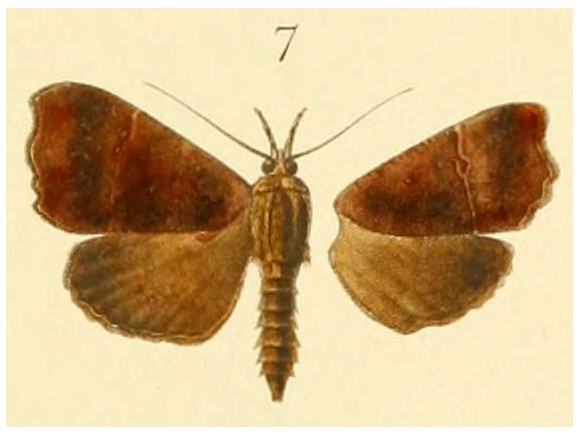

Scientific classification
- Kingdom: Animalia
- Phylum: Arthropoda
- Class: Insecta
- Order: Lepidoptera
- Superfamily: Noctuoidea
- Family: Erebidae
- Subfamily: Hypeninae
- Genus: Catada; Walker, [1859]

= Catada =

Genus of moths

Catada is a genus of moths of the family Erebidae. It was first described by Francis Walker in 1859.

== Description ==
Palpi slender, sickle shaped and naked. Second joint reaching far above vertex of head and tapering to extremity. Third joint long and slender. Antennae of male somewhat thickened and flattened or minutely ciliated. Thorax and abdomen smoothly scaled. Forewings with vein 7 from upper angle of cell. Hindwings with vein 5 from middle of discocellulars, where veins 6 and 7 usually arise from cell.

== Species ==
Some species of this genus are:

- Catada agassizi Holloway, 2008
- Catada antipodalis (Holland, 1900)
- Catada auchja Lödl, 2002
- Catada bellaria Lödl & Paumkirchner, 2001
- Catada bipartita (Moore, 1882)
- Catada canaliferalis (Moore, 1877)
- Catada charalis Swinhoe, 1900
- Catada cornesi Lödl, 2001
- Catada dahlioides Rothschild, 1915
- Catada dichroana (Viette, 1958)
- Catada griseomarginalis (Rothschild, 1915)
- Catada ja Lödl, 2001
- Catada janalis (Schaus, 1893)
- Catada ndalla Bethune-Baker, 1911
- Catada nebrida Holloway, 2008
- Catada obscura de Joannis, 1906
- Catada phaeopasta Hampson, 1909
- Catada philemonalis (Walker, 1859)
- Catada psychis Lödl & Paumkirchner, 2001
- Catada purpureotincta Hampson, 1895
- Catada rubricaea Schultze, 1907
- Catada rufula Holloway, 2008
- Catada transversalis (Moore, 1877)
- Catada vagalis Walker, 1859
