= Mimandria =

Scientific classification
- Kingdom: Animalia
- Phylum: Arthropoda
- Class: Insecta
- Order: Lepidoptera
- Family: Geometridae
- Tribe: Pseudoterpnini
- Genus: Mimandria; Warren, 1895

Genus of moths

Mimandria is a genus of moths in the family Geometridae described by Warren in 1895.

== Species ==
- Mimandria cataractae Prout, 1917
  - Mimandria cataractae cataractae Prout, 1917
  - Mimandria cataractae rhusiodocha Prout, 1934
- Mimandria diospyrata (Boisduval, 1833)
- Mimandria insularis Swinhoe, 1904
- Mimandria kely Viette, 1971
- Mimandria recognita (Saalmüller, 1891)
