= Epiphractis =

Scientific classification
- Kingdom: Animalia
- Phylum: Arthropoda
- Class: Insecta
- Order: Lepidoptera
- Family: Oecophoridae
- Subfamily: Oecophorinae
- Genus: Epiphractis; Meyrick, 1908

Type species
- Ephiphractis phoenicis Meyrick, 1908

Genus of moths

Epiphractis is a genus of moths in the family Oecophoridae.

== Species ==
- Epiphractis amphitricha Meyrick, 1910 (from Mauritius)
- Epiphractis aulica Meyrick, 1912 (from South Africa)
- Epiphractis crocoplecta Meyrick, 1913 (from South Africa)
- Epiphractis imbellis Meyrick, 1914 (from South Africa)
- Epiphractis pauliani Viette, 1949 (from Madagascar)
- Epiphractis phoenicis Meyrick, 1908 (from Angola)
- Epiphractis rubricata Meyrick, 1913 (from South Africa)
- Epiphractis sarcopa (Meyrick, 1909) (from South Africa)
- Epiphractis speciosella Legrand, 1966 (from Seychelles)
- Epiphractis superciliaris Meyrick, 1930 (from Sierra Leone)
- Epiphractis thysanarcha Meyrick, 1918 (from South Africa)
- Epiphractis tryphoxantha Meyrick, 1930 (from Mauritius)
