= Scopalostoma =

Scientific classification
- Kingdom: Animalia
- Phylum: Arthropoda
- Class: Insecta
- Order: Lepidoptera
- Family: Carposinidae
- Genus: Scopalostoma; Diakonoff, 1957

Genus of moths

Scopalostoma is a genus of moths in the Carposinidae family. At present this genus is only known from Réunion and contains the following species:

== Species ==
- Scopalostoma melanoparea Diakonoff, 1957
- Scopalostoma nigromaculella Guillermet, 2004
