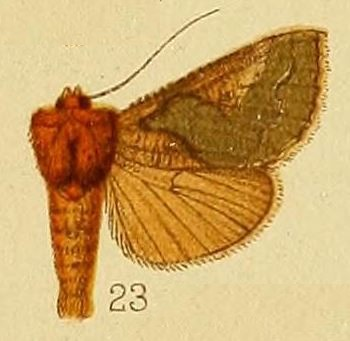
- Trichoplusia florina

Scientific classification
- Kingdom: Animalia
- Phylum: Arthropoda
- Class: Insecta
- Order: Lepidoptera
- Superfamily: Noctuoidea
- Family: Noctuidae
- Genus: Trichoplusia
- Species: T. florina

Binomial name
- Trichoplusia florina (Guenée, 1852)

Synonyms
- Plusia florina (Guenée, 1852); Phytometra florina; Thysanoplusia florina

= Trichoplusia florina =

Species of moth

Trichoplusia florina is a moth of the family Noctuidae. it is found in Madagascar and in Réunion.

== See also ==
- List of moths of Madagascar
- List of moths of Réunion
