= Leuronoma magna =

Scientific classification
- Domain: Eukaryota
- Kingdom: Animalia
- Phylum: Arthropoda
- Class: Insecta
- Order: Lepidoptera
- Family: Gelechiidae
- Genus: Leuronoma
- Species: L. magna

Binomial name
- Leuronoma magna Janse, 1958

Species of moth

Leuronoma magna is a moth of the family Gelechiidae. It was described by Anthonie Johannes Theodorus Janse in 1958. It is found in South Africa and Zimbabwe.
