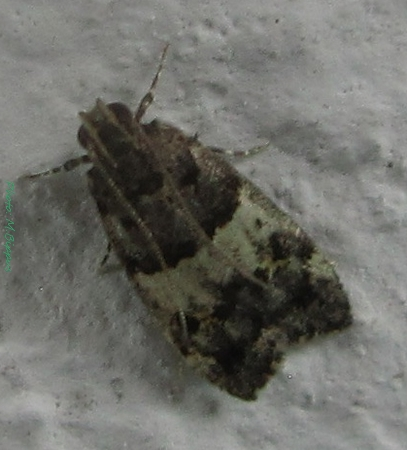

Scientific classification
- Kingdom: Animalia
- Phylum: Arthropoda
- Class: Insecta
- Order: Lepidoptera
- Family: Oecophoridae
- Subfamily: Oecophorinae
- Genus: Ancylometis; Meyrick, 1887

= Ancylometis =

Genus of moths

Ancylometis is a genus of moths in the family Oecophoridae. The species of this genus are found on the Indian Ocean islands of Madagascar, Mauritius and Réunion.

== Species ==
- Ancylometis ansarti Guillermet, 2010
- Ancylometis asbolopa Meyrick, 1923
- Ancylometis celineae Guillermet, 2010
- Ancylometis dilucida Meyrick, 1910 (from Mauritius)
- Ancylometis glebaria (Meyrick, 1910)
- Ancylometis hemilyca (Meyrick, 1910)
- Ancylometis isophaula Meyrick, 1934 (from Madagascar)
- Ancylometis lavergnella Guillermet, 2011
- Ancylometis metacrocota Meyrick, 1930 (from Mauritius)
- Ancylometis mulaella Guillermet, 2011
- Ancylometis orphania (Meyrick, 1910)
- Ancylometis paulianella Viette, 1957
- Ancylometis phylotypa Meyrick, 1930 (from Mauritius)
- Ancylometis ribesae Viette, 1996
- Ancylometis scaeocosma Meyrick, 1887
- Ancylometis trigonodes Meyrick, 1887 (from Mauritius)
