= Leuronoma eodryas =

Scientific classification
- Kingdom: Animalia
- Phylum: Arthropoda
- Class: Insecta
- Order: Lepidoptera
- Family: Gelechiidae
- Genus: Leuronoma
- Species: L. eodryas

Binomial name
- Leuronoma eodryas (Meyrick, 1918)

Synonyms
- Acompsia eodryas Meyrick, 1918

Species of moth

Leuronoma eodryas is a moth of the family Gelechiidae. It was described by Edward Meyrick in 1918. It is found in South Africa.

The wingspan is 11–12 mm. The forewings are pale ochreous yellowish, the dorsal area variably tinged or mixed with brown. There is a narrow rosy-brown fascia from the base of the costa to the dorsum before the middle, marked with black on the fold. There is a similar fascia from one-fifth of the costa to the dorsum before the tornus, then angulated upwards to the costa before the apex. The costal space enclosed by this forms a rosy-brown triangular blotch separated from it by a slender streak of ground colour sometimes interrupted at its apex. The stigmata are black, on the margin of the angulated fascia, the plical somewhat before the first discal, the second discal sometimes absent, a black mark also on dorsal angle of the fascia. The costal edge of these markings is more or less tinged with blackish and there is an irregular line of black and rosy-brown scales along the termen. The hindwings are bluish grey, lighter anteriorly.
