= Leuronoma vinolenta =

Scientific classification
- Kingdom: Animalia
- Phylum: Arthropoda
- Class: Insecta
- Order: Lepidoptera
- Family: Gelechiidae
- Genus: Leuronoma
- Species: L. vinolenta

Binomial name
- Leuronoma vinolenta (Meyrick, 1919)

Synonyms
- Acompsia vinolenta Meyrick, 1919

Species of moth

Leuronoma vinolenta is a moth of the family Gelechiidae. It was described by Edward Meyrick in 1919. It is found in southern India.

The wingspan is about 8 mm. The forewings are pale yellowish with grey, or rosy-purplish suffusedly irrorated (sprinkled) grey markings. There is an irregular fascia from the base of the costa to one-third of the dorsum, connected by a bar with the base of dorsum, a black dot on its posterior edge near the costa. A somewhat broader fascia is found from one-fourth of the costa to the tornus, the plical stigma forming a black dot on its anterior edge, the first discal rather obliquely beyond the plical on its posterior edge, a small blackish dot on the anterior edge towards the costa and a subtriangular patch extending along the costa from before the middle to three-fourths. There is also a narrow irregular almost terminal fascia from the tornal end of the preceding fascia to the costa just before the apex and some scattered black scales on the termen towards the apex. The hindwings are grey.
