= Ancylometis paulianella =

Scientific classification
- Kingdom: Animalia
- Phylum: Arthropoda
- Class: Insecta
- Order: Lepidoptera
- Family: Oecophoridae
- Genus: Ancylometis
- Species: A. paulianella

Binomial name
- Ancylometis paulianella Viette, 1957

Species of moth

Ancylometis paulianella is a species of moth in the family Oecophoridae. It occurs on Réunion.

== See also ==
- List of moths of Réunion
