= Mimandria cataractae =

Scientific classification
- Kingdom: Animalia
- Phylum: Arthropoda
- Class: Insecta
- Order: Lepidoptera
- Family: Geometridae
- Genus: Mimandria
- Species: M. cataractae

Binomial name
- Mimandria cataractae L. B. Prout, 1917

Species of moth

Mimandria cataractae is a moth of the family Geometridae first described by Louis Beethoven Prout in 1917. It is found in Kenya, South Africa and Zimbabwe.

== Subspecies ==
- Mimandria cataractae cataractae
- Mimandria cataractae rhusiodocha Prout, 1934
