= Protaphreutis borboniella =

Scientific classification
- Kingdom: Animalia
- Phylum: Arthropoda
- Class: Insecta
- Order: Lepidoptera
- Family: Tineidae
- Genus: Protaphreutis
- Species: P. borboniella

Binomial name
- Protaphreutis borboniella (Boisduval, 1833)

Synonyms
- Tinea borboniella Boisduval, 1833; Tiquadra trancarti Guillermet, 2010; Protaphreutis trancarti; Tinea acquisitella Walker, 1863

Species of moth

Protaphreutis borboniella is a moth of the family Tineidae. It is found on Réunion, Madagascar and Mauritius.

== See also ==
- List of moths of Réunion
- List of moths of Madagascar
- List of moths of Mauritius
