= Nola herbuloti =

Scientific classification
- Kingdom: Animalia
- Phylum: Arthropoda
- Class: Insecta
- Order: Lepidoptera
- Superfamily: Noctuoidea
- Family: Nolidae
- Genus: Nola
- Species: N. herbuloti

Binomial name
- Nola herbuloti Toulgoët, 1982

Synonyms
- Mecothrix herbuloti (Toulgoët, 1982)

Species of moth

Nola herbuloti is a moth of the family Nolidae first described by Hervé de Toulgoët in 1982. This species is endemic to Réunion in the Indian Ocean.

The wingspan is 15–16 mm and types were collected at an altitude of 1200 m in Cilaos. The author dedicated this species to the collector Claude Herbulot.

== See also ==
- List of moths of Réunion
