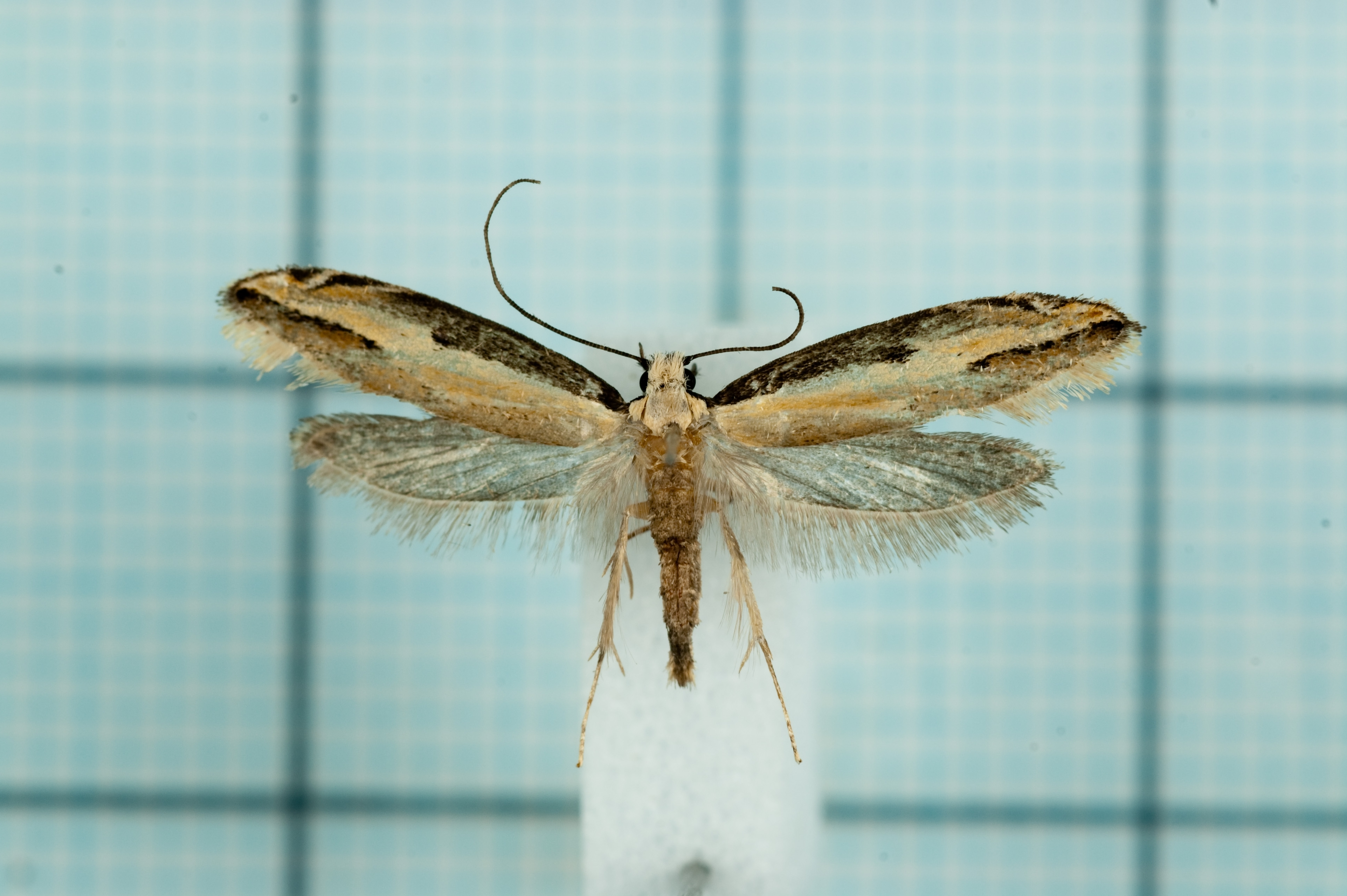
- Tineovertex melanochrysa

Scientific classification
- Kingdom: Animalia
- Phylum: Arthropoda
- Class: Insecta
- Order: Lepidoptera
- Family: Tineidae
- Genus: Tineovertex
- Species: T. melanochrysa

Binomial name
- Tineovertex melanochrysa (Meyrick, 1911)

Synonyms
- Tinea melanochrysa Meyrick, 1911; Tineovertex melanochrysa

= Tineovertex melanochrysa =

Species of moth

Tineovertex melanochrysa is a moth of the family Tineidae first described by Edward Meyrick in 1911. It is found in Japan, India and Taiwan.
