= Peritrichocera =

Scientific classification
- Domain: Eukaryota
- Kingdom: Animalia
- Phylum: Arthropoda
- Class: Insecta
- Order: Lepidoptera
- Family: Carposinidae
- Genus: Peritrichocera; Diakonoff, 1961

Genus of moths

Peritrichocera is a moth genus in the family Carposinidae.

== Species ==
- Peritrichocera barboniella Guillermet, 2012
- Peritrichocera bipectinata Diakonoff, 1961
- Peritrichocera bougreauella Guillermet, 2012
- Peritrichocera tsilaosa Viette, 1995
