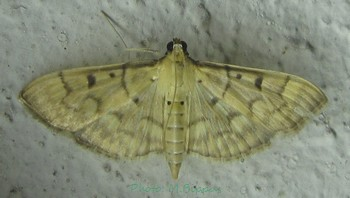

Scientific classification
- Kingdom: Animalia
- Phylum: Arthropoda
- Clade: Pancrustacea
- Class: Insecta
- Order: Lepidoptera
- Family: Crambidae
- Genus: Herpetogramma
- Species: H. couteneyi

Binomial name
- Herpetogramma couteneyi Guillermet, 2008

Synonyms
- Herpetogramma couteyeni

= Herpetogramma couteneyi =

Species of moth

Herpetogramma couteneyi is a species of moth in the family Crambidae. It is endemic to Réunion.

== See also ==
- List of moths of Réunion
