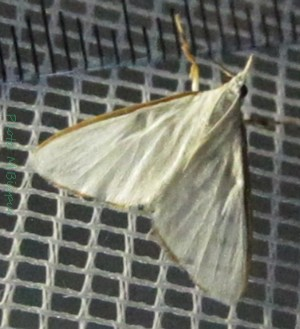

Scientific classification
- Kingdom: Animalia
- Phylum: Arthropoda
- Class: Insecta
- Order: Lepidoptera
- Family: Crambidae
- Genus: Cirrhochrista
- Species: C. etiennei

Binomial name
- Cirrhochrista etiennei (Viette, 1975)

Synonyms
- Ancalidia etiennei Viette, 1975

= Cirrhochrista etiennei =

Species of moth

Cirrhochrista etiennei is a moth of the family Crambidae. It was described by Pierre Viette in 1975 and it is endemic to Réunion.

The length of the wings is about 13 mm and the wingspan is about 26–28 mm. Adults are white, with a narrow brown stripe at the edge of the forewings.

== See also ==
- List of moths of Réunion
