= Oedebasis mutilata =

Scientific classification
- Kingdom: Animalia
- Phylum: Arthropoda
- Clade: Pancrustacea
- Class: Insecta
- Order: Lepidoptera
- Superfamily: Noctuoidea
- Family: Erebidae
- Genus: Oedebasis
- Species: O. mutilata

Binomial name
- Oedebasis mutilata (Berio, 1966)

Synonyms
- Athyrma mutilata Berio, 1966

Species of moth

Oedebasis mutilata is a moth of the family Erebidae first described by Emilio Berio in 1966. It is known from eastern Madagascar.

The female of this species has a wingspan of 36 mm.
