= Borboniella discruciata =

Scientific classification
- Kingdom: Animalia
- Phylum: Arthropoda
- Class: Insecta
- Order: Lepidoptera
- Family: Tortricidae
- Genus: Borboniella
- Species: B. discruciata

Binomial name
- Borboniella discruciata (Meyrick, 1930)

Synonyms
- Tortrix discruciata Meyrick, 1930

Species of moth

Borboniella discruciata is a species of moth of the family Tortricidae. It is found on Mauritius in the Indian Ocean.
