= Mimandria insularis =

Scientific classification
- Kingdom: Animalia
- Phylum: Arthropoda
- Class: Insecta
- Order: Lepidoptera
- Family: Geometridae
- Genus: Mimandria
- Species: M. insularis

Binomial name
- Mimandria insularis C. Swinhoe, 1904

Species of moth

Mimandria insularis is a moth of the family Geometridae first described by Charles Swinhoe in 1904. It is found on Madagascar.
