= Epiphractis aulica =

Scientific classification
- Kingdom: Animalia
- Phylum: Arthropoda
- Class: Insecta
- Order: Lepidoptera
- Family: Oecophoridae
- Genus: Epiphractis
- Species: E. aulica

Binomial name
- Epiphractis aulica Meyrick, 1912

Species of moth

Epiphractis aulica is a moth of the family Oecophoridae. This species was described from South Africa.

The wingspan is about 18 mm. The head and palpi are purplish-rosy sprinkled with whitish points and the face is whitish. The thorax is light ochreous-yellow, with the abdomen grey. The forewings are elongate, the costa moderately arched, ferruginous suffused with purplish-rosy and with an elongate light ochreous-yellow patch extending along the dorsum from the base to beyond the middle and reaching to the fold. The hindwings are grey, somewhat darker posteriorly.
