= Pseudoceroprepes piratis =

Scientific classification
- Kingdom: Animalia
- Phylum: Arthropoda
- Clade: Pancrustacea
- Class: Insecta
- Order: Lepidoptera
- Family: Pyralidae
- Genus: Pseudoceroprepes
- Species: P. piratis

Binomial name
- Pseudoceroprepes piratis (Meyrick, 1887)

Synonyms
- Tetralopha piratis Meyrick, 1887

Species of moth

Pseudoceroprepes piratis is a species of snout moth described by Edward Meyrick in 1887.

== Distribution ==
It is known from Australia and Papua New Guinea.
