= Epiphractis imbellis =

Scientific classification
- Kingdom: Animalia
- Phylum: Arthropoda
- Class: Insecta
- Order: Lepidoptera
- Family: Oecophoridae
- Genus: Epiphractis
- Species: E. imbellis

Binomial name
- Epiphractis imbellis Meyrick, 1914

Species of moth

Epiphractis imbellis is a moth of the family Oecophoridae. This species was described from South Africa.

The wingspan is about 19 mm. The head, palpi, thorax and abdomen are whitish. The forewings are elongate, the costa gently arched, ochreous-whitish with a brown-reddish dorsum near the base, a brown-reddish streak from one-fourth of the disc to two-thirds of the dorsum, posteriorly triangularly dilated below the middle and sending a branch to the lower angle of the cell. There is a triangular patch of scattered light brown-reddish suffusion resting on the termen, with a few dark fuscous scales, its apex indicating the second discal stigma. The hindwings are ochreous-whitish.
