= Epiphractis rubricata =

Scientific classification
- Kingdom: Animalia
- Phylum: Arthropoda
- Clade: Pancrustacea
- Class: Insecta
- Order: Lepidoptera
- Family: Oecophoridae
- Genus: Epiphractis
- Species: E. rubricata

Binomial name
- Epiphractis rubricata Meyrick, 1913

Species of moth

Epiphractis rubricata is a moth of the family Oecophoridae first described by Edward Meyrick in 1913. This species was described from Pretoria and Pinetown in South Africa.

The wingspan is 13–19 mm. The head and thorax of this species are dark purplish fuscous closely irrorated (speckled) with white, the thorax sometimes tinged with yellowish. The forewings are elongate, the costa gently arched and of light reddish-ochreous brown or dark fuscous. They are variably irrorated with whitish, the costal edge more or less whitish. There are two bright deep yellow dorsal patches, the first elongate, reaching from the base to or near the middle, confluent on the dorsum with second or in darker specimens separated from it by a patch of crimson-purple suffusion, its dorsal edge usually brown reddish or purple towards the base, the second smaller, rounded, sometimes followed by crimson-purple suffusion, in lighter specimens the second blotch is surrounded by dark fuscous suffusion. The terminal area is sometimes suffused with purple. The hindwings are grey or rather dark grey.
