= Comostolopsis subsimplex =

Scientific classification
- Kingdom: Animalia
- Phylum: Arthropoda
- Clade: Pancrustacea
- Class: Insecta
- Order: Lepidoptera
- Family: Geometridae
- Genus: Comostolopsis
- Species: C. subsimplex

Binomial name
- Comostolopsis subsimplex Prout, 1913

Species of moth

Comostolopsis subsimplex is a moth of the family Geometridae first described by Louis Beethoven Prout in 1913. This species was described from Madagascar.

This species has a bright orange face, bright orange palpus, the wings rather bright green, slightly darker than in Comostolopsis simplex, the costal edge of forewing is extremely narrowly ochreous; both wings bear a dark red discal dot and golden-yellow fringes. The forewing have two wavy, whitish, transverse lines. The underside of the wings is whitish green, the forewing with decided red suffusion and yellowish fringes. The wingspan is 16–18 mm.

== See also ==
- List of moths of Madagascar
