= Mimandria kely =

Scientific classification
- Kingdom: Animalia
- Phylum: Arthropoda
- Class: Insecta
- Order: Lepidoptera
- Family: Geometridae
- Genus: Mimandria
- Species: M. kely

Binomial name
- Mimandria kely Viette, 1971

Species of moth

Mimandria kely is a moth of the family Geometridae first described by Pierre Viette in 1971. It is found on Madagascar.
