= Scoparia resinodes =

Scientific classification
- Kingdom: Animalia
- Phylum: Arthropoda
- Class: Insecta
- Order: Lepidoptera
- Family: Crambidae
- Genus: Scoparia
- Species: S. resinodes

Binomial name
- Scoparia resinodes de Joannis, 1932

Species of moth endemic to Réunion

Scoparia resinodes is a species of moth in the family Crambidae. The species was first described by Joseph de Joannis in 1932. It is **endemic to Réunion**, where it is reported to be a **common species**.

== See also ==
- List of moths of Réunion
