= Borboniella =

Scientific classification
- Domain: Eukaryota
- Kingdom: Animalia
- Phylum: Arthropoda
- Class: Insecta
- Order: Lepidoptera
- Family: Tortricidae
- Subfamily: Tortricinae
- Tribe: Archipini
- Genus: Borboniella; Diakonoff, 1957

Genus of tortrix moths

Borboniella is a genus of moths belonging to the subfamily Tortricinae of the family Tortricidae. The genus was erected by Alexey Diakonoff in 1957.

== Species ==
- Borboniella allomorpha (Meyrick, 1922)
- Borboniella bifracta Diakonoff, 1957
- Borboniella chrysorrhoea Diakonoff, 1957
- Borboniella conflatilis Diakonoff, 1977
- Borboniella cubophora Diakonoff, 1957
- Borboniella discruciata (Meyrick, 1930)
- Borboniella gigantella Guillermet, 2004
- Borboniella leucaspis Diakonoff, 1957
- Borboniella marmaromorpha Diakonoff, 1957
- Borboniella montana Diakonoff, 1957
- Borboniella octops Diakonoff, 1957
- Borboniella pelecys Diakonoff, 1957
- Borboniella peruella Guillermet, 2012
- Borboniella rosacea Diakonoff, 1960
- Borboniella rougonella Guillermet, 2012
- Borboniella spudaea Diakonoff, 1957
- Borboniella striatella Guillermet, 2012
- Borboniella tekayaella Guillermet, 2013
- Borboniella viettei Diakonoff, 1957
- Borboniella vulpicolor Diakonoff, 1957

== See also ==
- List of Tortricidae genera
