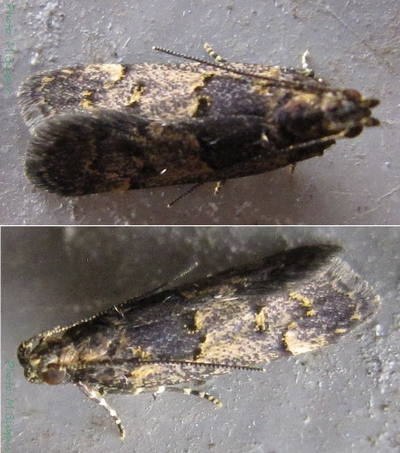

Scientific classification
- Kingdom: Animalia
- Phylum: Arthropoda
- Class: Insecta
- Order: Lepidoptera
- Family: Oecophoridae
- Genus: Ancylometis
- Species: A. mulaella

Binomial name
- Ancylometis mulaella Guillermet, 2011

= Ancylometis mulaella =

Species of moth

Ancylometis mulaella is a species of moth in the family Oecophoridae. It is endemic to Réunion in the Indian Ocean.

== See also ==
- Picture of Ancylometis mulaella
- List of moths of Réunion
