= Tineovertex melliflua =

Scientific classification
- Kingdom: Animalia
- Phylum: Arthropoda
- Class: Insecta
- Order: Lepidoptera
- Family: Tineidae
- Genus: Tineovertex
- Species: T. melliflua

Binomial name
- Tineovertex melliflua (Meyrick, 1911)

Synonyms
- Tinea melliflua Meyrick, 1911; Tineovertex melliflua Robinson & Tuck 1996

Species of moth

Tineovertex melliflua is a moth of the family Tineidae first described by Edward Meyrick in 1911. It is found in Sri Lanka.

It can be discriminated from other members of the genus by the shape of its saccus, which is like an elongated triangle, its elongate-spatulate valva and its wedge-shaped uncus. Adult wingspan is 6.5–7.0 mm. In the male, the head is whitish. Termen yellowish white. Costa with a broad irregular black streak runs from base to near apex. There is a narrow and nearly straight black streak runs from dorsum base to apex. This streak separates creamy-white and yellowish-white areas. Hindwings yellowish brown. Female is not observed. They are normally found during September.
