= Leuronoma veterascens =

Scientific classification
- Kingdom: Animalia
- Phylum: Arthropoda
- Class: Insecta
- Order: Lepidoptera
- Family: Gelechiidae
- Genus: Leuronoma
- Species: L. veterascens

Binomial name
- Leuronoma veterascens Meyrick, 1918

Species of moth

Leuronoma veterascens is a moth of the family Gelechiidae. It was described by Edward Meyrick in 1918. It is found in South Africa.

The wingspan is 11–12 mm. The forewings are light brownish, irregularly sprinkled with dark fuscous and some blackish scales. The stigmata are blackish, the plical rather obliquely before the first discal. There are obscure opposite spots of dark fuscous irroration (sprinkles) on the costa and dorsum just beyond the second discal. The hindwings are grey.
