= Leuronoma chlorotoma =

Scientific classification
- Kingdom: Animalia
- Phylum: Arthropoda
- Clade: Pancrustacea
- Class: Insecta
- Order: Lepidoptera
- Family: Gelechiidae
- Genus: Leuronoma
- Species: L. chlorotoma

Binomial name
- Leuronoma chlorotoma Meyrick, 1918

Species of moth

Leuronoma chlorotoma is a moth of the family Gelechiidae. It was described by Edward Meyrick in 1918. It is found in South Africa.

The wingspan is about 16 mm (0.63 in). The forewings are rosy brown, somewhat mixed irregularly with grey and towards the dorsum suffused with grey, all veins except towards the dorsum are marked with slender rather irregular whitish-ochreous lines. The plical stigma is cloudy and blackish. The hindwings are light slaty grey.
