= Glyphodes cadeti =

Scientific classification
- Kingdom: Animalia
- Phylum: Arthropoda
- Clade: Pancrustacea
- Class: Insecta
- Order: Lepidoptera
- Family: Crambidae
- Genus: Glyphodes
- Species: G. cadeti

Binomial name
- Glyphodes cadeti Guillermet, 1996

Species of moth

Glyphodes cadeti is a moth of the family Crambidae. It was described by Christian Guillermet in 1996 and is found on Réunion.

== See also ==
- List of moths of Réunion
