= Leuronoma nigridorsis =

Scientific classification
- Kingdom: Animalia
- Phylum: Arthropoda
- Class: Insecta
- Order: Lepidoptera
- Family: Gelechiidae
- Genus: Leuronoma
- Species: L. nigridorsis

Binomial name
- Leuronoma nigridorsis Meyrick, 1921

Species of moth

Leuronoma nigridorsis is a moth of the family Gelechiidae. It was described by Edward Meyrick in 1921. It is found in Zimbabwe and South Africa.

The wingspan is about 12 mm. The forewings are pale ochreous, with a few dark fuscous specks and a subtriangular dark fuscous spot on the base of the costa, as well as a narrow suffused dark fuscous streak along the dorsum from near the base to the tornus. The plical and second discal stigmata are small and dark fuscous and there is a rather elongate spot of dark fuscous suffusion on the costa at three-fourths. Some pale brownish suffusion is found towards the upper part of the termen and there is a small blackish mark on the apical edge, and a dot on the termen beneath it. The hindwings are rather dark grey, lighter and thinly scaled anteriorly.
