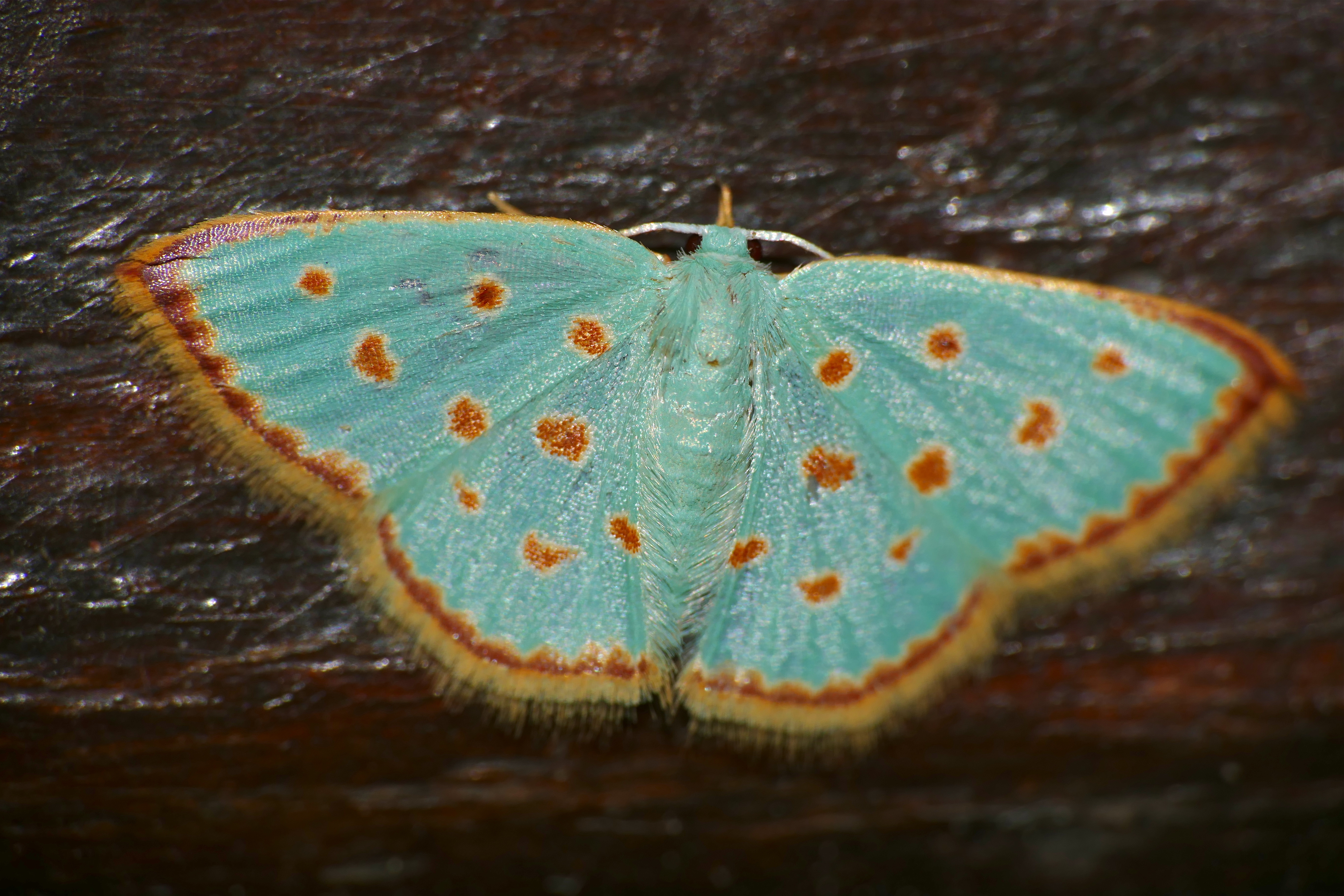
- C. stillata

Scientific classification
- Kingdom: Animalia
- Phylum: Arthropoda
- Clade: Pancrustacea
- Class: Insecta
- Order: Lepidoptera
- Family: Geometridae
- Subfamily: Geometrinae
- Genus: Comostolopsis; Warren, 1902

Type species
- Comostolopsis coerulea Warren, 1902

= Comostolopsis =

Genus of moths

Comostolopsis is a genus of moths in the family Geometridae. It was described by Warren in 1902.

== Species ==
- Comostolopsis apicata (Warren, 1898)
- Comostolopsis apodosima Prout, 1931
- Comostolopsis capensis (Warren, 1899)
- Comostolopsis coerulea Warren, 1902
- Comostolopsis convalescens Herbulot, 1981
- Comostolopsis fluorita Prout, 1927
- Comostolopsis germana Prout, 1916
- Comostolopsis glos D. S. Fletcher, 1978
- Comostolopsis intensa Prout, 1915
- Comostolopsis leuconeura Prout, 1930
- Comostolopsis marginata
- Comostolopsis regina
- Comostolopsis rubristicta (Warren, 1899)
- Comostolopsis rufocellata (Mabille, 1900)
- Comostolopsis rufostellata (Mabille, 1900)
- Comostolopsis simplex Warren, 1902
- Comostolopsis sladeni Prout, 1915
- Comostolopsis stillata (Felder & Rogenhofer, 1875)
- Comostolopsis subsimplex Prout, 1913
- Comostolopsis tmematica Prout, 1934
- Comostolopsis viridellaria (Mabille, 1898)
