= Thylacoptila =

Scientific classification
- Kingdom: Animalia
- Phylum: Arthropoda
- Class: Insecta
- Order: Lepidoptera
- Family: Pyralidae
- Tribe: Phycitini
- Genus: Thylacoptila; Meyrick, 1885

Synonyms
- Bussa Ragonot, 1888

Genus of moths

Thylacoptila is a genus of snout moths. It was described by Edward Meyrick in 1885.

== Species ==
- Thylacoptila borbonica Guillermet, 2007
- Thylacoptila paurosema Meyrick, 1885
