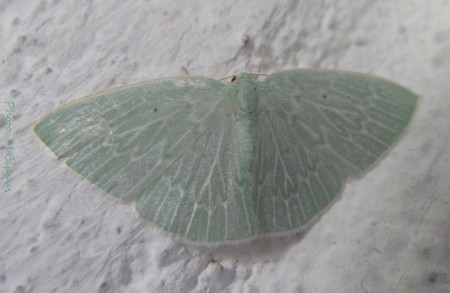

Scientific classification
- Kingdom: Animalia
- Phylum: Arthropoda
- Clade: Pancrustacea
- Class: Insecta
- Order: Lepidoptera
- Family: Geometridae
- Genus: Comostolopsis
- Species: C. leuconeura

Binomial name
- Comostolopsis leuconeura Prout, 1930

= Comostolopsis leuconeura =

Species of moth

Comostolopsis leuconeura is a moth of the family Geometridae first described by Louis Beethoven Prout in 1930. It is endemic to Réunion.

The wingspan is 15–22 mm.

The larvae feed on Flacourtiaceae (Aphloia theiformis).

== See also ==
- List of moths of Réunion
