= Ancylometis trigonodes =

Scientific classification
- Kingdom: Animalia
- Phylum: Arthropoda
- Class: Insecta
- Order: Lepidoptera
- Family: Oecophoridae
- Genus: Ancylometis
- Species: A. trigonodes

Binomial name
- Ancylometis trigonodes Meyrick, 1887

Species of moth

Ancylometis trigonodes is a species of moth in the family Oecophoridae. It is known from Mauritius.

This species has a wingspan of 11mm for the male. Its head is ochreous-yellow, the face whitish-ochreous. Antennae and thorax are dark-fuscous, the abdomen greyish-ochreous. Forewings are elongated and rather narrow, the costa moderately arched. They are dark fuscous, very slightly purplish-tinged with a large ochreous-white triangular patch mixed with pale yellow in the middle. Hindwings are fuscous-grey, becoming paler and semitransparent on the basal half.
