= Leuronoma =

Scientific classification
- Kingdom: Animalia
- Phylum: Arthropoda
- Class: Insecta
- Order: Lepidoptera
- Family: Gelechiidae
- Tribe: Gelechiini
- Genus: Leuronoma; Meyrick, 1918

Type species
- Leuronoma chlorotoma Meyrick, 1918

Genus of moths

Leuronoma is a genus of moths in the family Gelechiidae. Most species of this genus are found in Africa.

== Species ==
Some species of this genus are:

- Leuronoma chlorotoma Meyrick, 1918
- Leuronoma eodryas (Meyrick, 1918)
- Leuronoma fauvella Viette, 1957
- Leuronoma magna Janse, 1958
- Leuronoma nigridorsis Meyrick, 1921
- Leuronoma oenochyta (Meyrick, 1921)
- Leuronoma textifera (Meyrick, 1913)
- Leuronoma veterascens Meyrick, 1918
- Leuronoma vinolenta Meyrick, 1919
- Leuronoma zymotis (Meyrick, 1909)
