= Borboniella rosacea =

Scientific classification
- Domain: Eukaryota
- Kingdom: Animalia
- Phylum: Arthropoda
- Class: Insecta
- Order: Lepidoptera
- Family: Tortricidae
- Genus: Borboniella
- Species: B. rosacea

Binomial name
- Borboniella rosacea Diakonoff, 1960

Species of moth

Borboniella rosacea is a species of moth of the family Tortricidae. It is found on Mauritius in the Indian Ocean.
