= Leuronoma textifera =

Scientific classification
- Kingdom: Animalia
- Phylum: Arthropoda
- Clade: Pancrustacea
- Class: Insecta
- Order: Lepidoptera
- Family: Gelechiidae
- Genus: Leuronoma
- Species: L. textifera

Binomial name
- Leuronoma textifera (Meyrick, 1913)

Synonyms
- Gelechia textifera Meyrick, 1913

Species of moth

Leuronoma textifera is a moth of the family Gelechiidae. It was described by Edward Meyrick in 1913. It is found in South Africa.

The wingspan is about 9 mm. The forewings are deep yellow with three irregular very oblique fasciae of dense dark purplish-fuscous irroration (sprinkles) occupying most of the wing, the first from the base of the costa to the middle of the dorsum, connected with a patch on the base of the dorsum, the second from one-third of the costa to the tornus, the third dilated to extend on the costa from before the middle to three-fourths, connected with the second in the disc and again on the tornus, very irregular in the apical area and connected with a costal patch before or including the apex. The stigmata are blackish, the plical rather before the first discal, these two on the margins of the second fascia, the second discal minute, placed in a round spot of ground colour lying between the connections of the second and third fasciae. The hindwings are grey.
