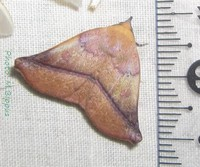

Scientific classification
- Domain: Eukaryota
- Kingdom: Animalia
- Phylum: Arthropoda
- Class: Insecta
- Order: Lepidoptera
- Superfamily: Noctuoidea
- Family: Erebidae
- Subfamily: Calpinae
- Genus: Prominea; Saalmüller, 1891

= Prominea =

Genus of moths

Prominea is a genus of moths of the family Erebidae. The genus was erected by Max Saalmüller in 1891. Both the genus are found on Madagascar.

== Species ==
- Prominea jeanneli Viette, 1954
- Prominea porrecta (Saalmüller, 1880)
