= Ancylometis ansarti =

Scientific classification
- Domain: Eukaryota
- Kingdom: Animalia
- Phylum: Arthropoda
- Class: Insecta
- Order: Lepidoptera
- Family: Oecophoridae
- Genus: Ancylometis
- Species: A. ansarti

Binomial name
- Ancylometis ansarti Guillermet, 2010

Species of moth

Ancylometis ansarti is a species of moth in the family Oecophoridae. It is endemic to Réunion.

== See also ==
- Picture of Ancylometis ansarti
- List of moths of Réunion
