= Epiphractis thysanarcha =

Scientific classification
- Kingdom: Animalia
- Phylum: Arthropoda
- Class: Insecta
- Order: Lepidoptera
- Family: Oecophoridae
- Genus: Epiphractis
- Species: E. thysanarcha

Binomial name
- Epiphractis thysanarcha Meyrick, 1918

Species of moth

Epiphractis thysanarcha is a moth of the family Oecophoridae. This species was described from South Africa.

The wingspan is about 20 mm. The head, palpi and thorax are dull brownish-crimson. The forewings are elongate, the costa moderately arched, dull light crimson, slightly ochreous tinged with a few scattered blackish scales posteriorly and an inwardly oblique dark grey streak from the middle of the dorsum, reaching half across the wing, edged posteriorly with light ochreous-yellowish. The second discal stigma is small and dark grey and there is a short rather inwards-oblique streak of dark grey suffusion from the dorsum beneath it. The hindwings are grey.
