= Pseudoceroprepes nosivolella =

Scientific classification
- Kingdom: Animalia
- Phylum: Arthropoda
- Class: Insecta
- Order: Lepidoptera
- Family: Pyralidae
- Genus: Pseudoceroprepes
- Species: P. nosivolella

Binomial name
- Pseudoceroprepes nosivolella (Viette, 1964)

Synonyms
- Salebria nosivolella Viette, 1964

Species of moth

Pseudoceroprepes nosivolella is a species of snout moth.

== Distribution ==
It is known from eastern Madagascar, Kenya and Nigeria.
