= Catada vagalis =

Scientific classification
- Kingdom: Animalia
- Phylum: Arthropoda
- Class: Insecta
- Order: Lepidoptera
- Superfamily: Noctuoidea
- Family: Erebidae
- Genus: Catada
- Species: C. vagalis

Binomial name
- Catada vagalis (Walker, 1858)

Synonyms
- Bocana vagalis Walker, 1858; Catada glomeralis Walker, 1858

Species of moth

Catada vagalis is a moth of the family Erebidae first described by Francis Walker in 1858. It is found in India, Sri Lanka, Peninsular Malaysia, Borneo and the Philippines.

Its forewings are dark brown with fine, transverse central white fasciae. Hindwings brownish. Larva spindle shaped. Head and body are dark purplish to black. There is a jet-black dorsal line. Ventrum olive green. Pupation occurs on the soil surface in a cell made by earth particles. Larval host plants are Rourea species.
