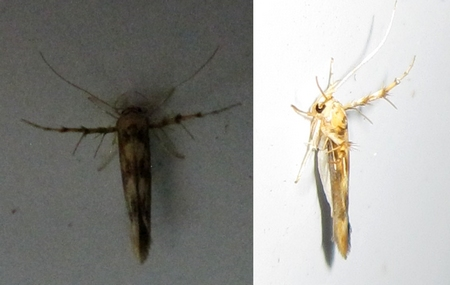

Scientific classification
- Kingdom: Animalia
- Phylum: Arthropoda
- Class: Insecta
- Order: Lepidoptera
- Family: Stathmopodidae
- Genus: Stathmopoda
- Species: S. margabim

Binomial name
- Stathmopoda margabim Viette, 1995

= Stathmopoda margabim =

Species of moth

Stathmopoda margabim is a species of moth of the family Stathmopodidae. It is endemic in Réunion island in the Indian Ocean, where it can be found from medium altitudes to high altitudes of more than 1300 meters.

== See also ==
- List of moths of Réunion
