= Acrocercops coffeifoliella =

Scientific classification
- Domain: Eukaryota
- Kingdom: Animalia
- Phylum: Arthropoda
- Class: Insecta
- Order: Lepidoptera
- Family: Gracillariidae
- Genus: Acrocercops
- Species: A. coffeifoliella

Binomial name
- Acrocercops coffeifoliella (Nietner, 1861)

Synonyms
- Gracilaria coffeifoliella Nietner, 1861; Acrocercops coffeifolella Paulian, 1950

Species of moth

Acrocercops coffeifoliella is a moth of the family Gracillariidae. It is known from India, Sri Lanka, Indonesia (Java), Réunion and Madagascar.

The larvae feed on Coffea species. They probably mine the leaves of their host plant.
