= Borboniella tekayaella =

Scientific classification
- Domain: Eukaryota
- Kingdom: Animalia
- Phylum: Arthropoda
- Class: Insecta
- Order: Lepidoptera
- Family: Tortricidae
- Genus: Borboniella
- Species: B. tekayaella

Binomial name
- Borboniella tekayaella Guillermet, 2013

Species of moth

Borboniella tekayaella is a species of moth of the family Tortricidae. It is found on Réunion island in the Indian Ocean.
