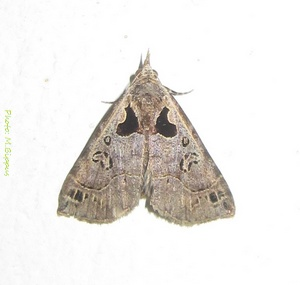

Scientific classification
- Kingdom: Animalia
- Phylum: Arthropoda
- Clade: Pancrustacea
- Class: Insecta
- Order: Lepidoptera
- Superfamily: Noctuoidea
- Family: Erebidae
- Subfamily: Hypeninae
- Genus: Arsina; Guenée, 1862
- Species: A. silenalis

Binomial name
- Arsina silenalis Guenée, 1862

Synonyms
- Hypena glyptalis Mabille, 1880; Arsina glyptalis; Hypospila nigropicta Heyden, 1891; Arsina nigropicta

= Arsina =

Genus of moths

Arsina is a monotypic moth genus in the family Erebidae. Its only species, Arsina silenalis is found on the Indian Ocean islands of Réunion, Aldabra, Madagascar and Zimbabwe. Both the genus and the species were first described by Achille Guenée in 1862.
