= Mimandria diospyrata =

Scientific classification
- Kingdom: Animalia
- Phylum: Arthropoda
- Clade: Pancrustacea
- Class: Insecta
- Order: Lepidoptera
- Family: Geometridae
- Genus: Mimandria
- Species: M. diospyarta

Binomial name
- Mimandria diospyarta (Boisduval, 1833)

Synonyms
- Geometra diospyrata Boisduval, 1833

Species of moth

Mimandria diospyrata is a moth of the family Geometridae first described by Jean Baptiste Boisduval in 1833. It is found on Réunion and Mauritius in the Indian Ocean.
