= Borboniella rougonella =

Scientific classification
- Domain: Eukaryota
- Kingdom: Animalia
- Phylum: Arthropoda
- Class: Insecta
- Order: Lepidoptera
- Family: Tortricidae
- Genus: Borboniella
- Species: B. rougonella

Binomial name
- Borboniella rougonella Guillermet, 2012

Species of moth

Borboniella rougonella is a species of moth of the family Tortricidae. It was described by Christian Guillermet in 2012 and is endemic to Réunion.
