= Eois suarezensis =

Scientific classification
- Kingdom: Animalia
- Phylum: Arthropoda
- Clade: Pancrustacea
- Class: Insecta
- Order: Lepidoptera
- Family: Geometridae
- Genus: Eois
- Species: E. suarezensis

Binomial name
- Eois suarezensis (Prout, 1923)

Synonyms
- Pseudasthena suarezensis Prout, 1923

Species of moth

Eois suarezensis is a moth in the family Geometridae. It is found on La Réunion and Madagascar.
