= Oedebasis ovipennis =

Scientific classification
- Kingdom: Animalia
- Phylum: Arthropoda
- Class: Insecta
- Order: Lepidoptera
- Superfamily: Noctuoidea
- Family: Erebidae
- Genus: Oedebasis
- Species: O. ovipennis

Binomial name
- Oedebasis ovipennis Hampson, 1902

Species of moth

Oedebasis ovipennis is a moth of the family Noctuidae. It is known from Mozambique, Seychelles and Réunion.

Male: Head, thorax and abdomen are reddish brown mixed with black, forewings pale red brown irrorated (speckled) with black. Hindwings pale fuscous brown.

Female: Vertex of thorax white, abdomen whitish.

Their wingspan is 30 mm.
