= Borboniella allomorpha =

Scientific classification
- Kingdom: Animalia
- Phylum: Arthropoda
- Class: Insecta
- Order: Lepidoptera
- Family: Tortricidae
- Genus: Borboniella
- Species: B. allomorpha

Binomial name
- Borboniella allomorpha (Meyrick, 1922)

Synonyms
- Panaphelix allomorpha Meyrick, 1922

Species of moth

Borboniella allomorpha is a species of moth of the family Tortricidae. It is found on Réunion island in the Indian Ocean.

The wingspan is 10–11 mm. Adults have been recorded on wing year-round.

The larvae feed on Antirhea borbonica, Aphloia theiformis and Hypericum lanceolatum.
