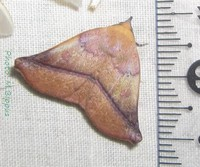

Scientific classification
- Kingdom: Animalia
- Phylum: Arthropoda
- Clade: Pancrustacea
- Class: Insecta
- Order: Lepidoptera
- Superfamily: Noctuoidea
- Family: Erebidae
- Genus: Prominea
- Species: P. porrecta

Binomial name
- Prominea porrecta (Saalmüller, 1880)

Synonyms
- Capnodes porrecta (Saalmüller, 1880)

= Prominea porrecta =

Species of moth

Prominea porrecta is a moth of the family Erebidae first described by Max Saalmüller in 1880. It is found on the African Indian Ocean islands of Madagascar, Réunion and Mauritius.

It has a wing length of about 16–17 mm and a wingspan around 33 mm.
