= Scopalostoma nigromaculella =

Scientific classification
- Kingdom: Animalia
- Phylum: Arthropoda
- Class: Insecta
- Order: Lepidoptera
- Family: Carposinidae
- Genus: Scopalostoma
- Species: S. nigromaculella

Binomial name
- Scopalostoma nigromaculella Guillermet, 2004

Species of moth

Scopalostoma nigromaculella is a moth of the Carposinidae family. It is endemic to La Réunion in the Indian Ocean.
