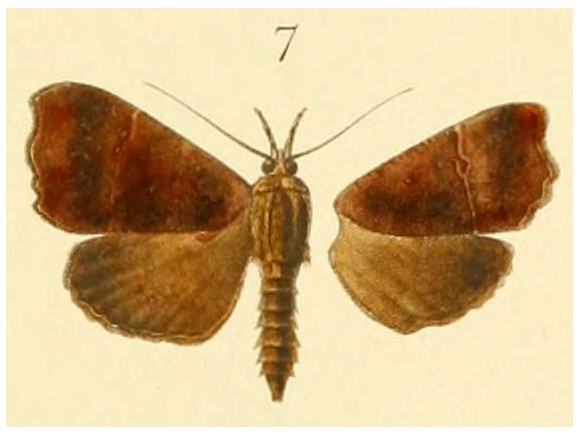

Scientific classification
- Domain: Eukaryota
- Kingdom: Animalia
- Phylum: Arthropoda
- Class: Insecta
- Order: Lepidoptera
- Superfamily: Noctuoidea
- Family: Erebidae
- Genus: Catada
- Species: C. obscura

Binomial name
- Catada obscura de Joannis, 1906

= Catada obscura =

Species of moth

Catada obscura is a moth of the family Erebidae first described by Joseph de Joannis in 1906. It is found on Réunion and Mauritius.
