= Leuronoma fauvella =

Scientific classification
- Kingdom: Animalia
- Phylum: Arthropoda
- Class: Insecta
- Order: Lepidoptera
- Family: Gelechiidae
- Genus: Leuronoma
- Species: L. fauvella

Binomial name
- Leuronoma fauvella Viette, 1957

Species of moth

Leuronoma fauvella is a moth of the family Gelechiidae. It was described by Viette in 1957. It is found on La Réunion.
