= Phyllonorycter ruizivorus =

Scientific classification
- Domain: Eukaryota
- Kingdom: Animalia
- Phylum: Arthropoda
- Class: Insecta
- Order: Lepidoptera
- Family: Gracillariidae
- Genus: Phyllonorycter
- Species: P. ruizivorus

Binomial name
- Phyllonorycter ruizivorus de Prins, 2012

Species of moth

Phyllonorycter ruizivorus is a moth of the family Gracillariidae. It is found on La Réunion island in the Indian Ocean.

The length of the forewings is 2.8–2.91 mm.
