= Thylacoptila paurosema =

Scientific classification
- Kingdom: Animalia
- Phylum: Arthropoda
- Class: Insecta
- Order: Lepidoptera
- Family: Pyralidae
- Genus: Thylacoptila
- Species: T. paurosema

Binomial name
- Thylacoptila paurosema Meyrick, 1888

Synonyms
- Nephopteryx paurosema; Bussa maculella Ragonot, 1888; Harraria diehlella Marion & Viette, 1956; Thylacoptila diehliella; Nephopteryx canescentella Hampson, 1896; Salebria thylacandra Meyrick, 1932

Species of moth

Thylacoptila paurosema is a species of moth of the family Pyralidae. It has a wide range and is found on the Canary Islands, Cabo Verde, Ethiopia, Ghana, Réunion, Saudi Arabia, Sierra Leone, Sudan, Namibia, South Africa, Yemen, Madagascar, Indonesia, Burma, Malaysia, Pakistan, Sri Lanka, India and Ascension Island.

The larvae are a pest of cashew and mango.
