= Thylacoptila borbonica =

Scientific classification
- Domain: Eukaryota
- Kingdom: Animalia
- Phylum: Arthropoda
- Class: Insecta
- Order: Lepidoptera
- Family: Pyralidae
- Genus: Thylacoptila
- Species: T. borbonica

Binomial name
- Thylacoptila borbonica Guillermet, 2007

Species of moth

Thylacoptila borbonica is a species of moth of the family Pyralidae. It is found on La Réunion.
