= Scopalostoma melanoparea =

Scientific classification
- Kingdom: Animalia
- Phylum: Arthropoda
- Class: Insecta
- Order: Lepidoptera
- Family: Carposinidae
- Genus: Scopalostoma
- Species: S. melanoparea

Binomial name
- Scopalostoma melanoparea Diakonoff, 1957

Species of moth

Scopalostoma melanoparea is a moth of the Carposinidae family. It is endemic to La Réunion in the Indian Ocean.
