= Oedebasis longipalpis =

Scientific classification
- Domain: Eukaryota
- Kingdom: Animalia
- Phylum: Arthropoda
- Class: Insecta
- Order: Lepidoptera
- Superfamily: Noctuoidea
- Family: Erebidae
- Genus: Oedebasis
- Species: O. longipalpis

Binomial name
- Oedebasis longipalpis (Berio, 1959)

Synonyms
- Parastenopterygia longipalpis Berio, 1959; Oedebasis malagasy Viette, 1971; Oedebasis legrandi Viette, 1971

Species of moth

Oedebasis longipalpis is a moth of the family Erebidae first described by Emilio Berio in 1959. It is known from Madagascar, Mauritius, Réunion and the Seychelles.
