= Borboniella viettei =

Scientific classification
- Domain: Eukaryota
- Kingdom: Animalia
- Phylum: Arthropoda
- Class: Insecta
- Order: Lepidoptera
- Family: Tortricidae
- Genus: Borboniella
- Species: B. viettei

Binomial name
- Borboniella viettei Diakonoff, 1957

Species of moth

Borboniella viettei is a species of moth of the family Tortricidae. It is found on Réunion island in the Indian Ocean.
