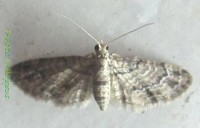

Scientific classification
- Domain: Eukaryota
- Kingdom: Animalia
- Phylum: Arthropoda
- Class: Insecta
- Order: Lepidoptera
- Family: Geometridae
- Genus: Eupithecia
- Species: E. graphiticata

Binomial name
- Eupithecia graphiticata de Joannis, 1932

Synonyms
- Eupithecia adunata Prout, 1935

= Eupithecia graphiticata =

Species of moth

Eupithecia graphiticata is a moth in the family Geometridae. It is found in La Réunion where it is mostly found in high altitude forests in the end of the winter.

This species has a wingspan of 18-24mm and the larvae feed on Erica reunionensis, an Ericaceae.
