= Scopula internataria =

Scientific classification
- Domain: Eukaryota
- Kingdom: Animalia
- Phylum: Arthropoda
- Class: Insecta
- Order: Lepidoptera
- Family: Geometridae
- Genus: Scopula
- Species: S. internataria

Binomial name
- Scopula internataria (Walker, 1861)

Synonyms
- Acidalia tremula Bastelberger, 1909; Acidalia punctistriata Mabille, 1880; Acidalia cuspidata Mabille, 1900; Scopula internataria eucentra Prout, 1928

Species of geometer moth in subfamily Sterrhinae

Scopula internataria is a moth of the family Geometridae. It was described by Francis Walker in 1861. It is found in Angola, the Comoros, the Democratic Republic of the Congo, Ivory Coast, Kenya, Réunion, Madagascar, Malawi, Mozambique, South Africa, Sudan, Tanzania, Uganda and Zambia.

== Subspecies ==
- Scopula internataria internataria
- Scopula internataria punctistriata (Mabille, 1880) (Réunion, Madagascar)
