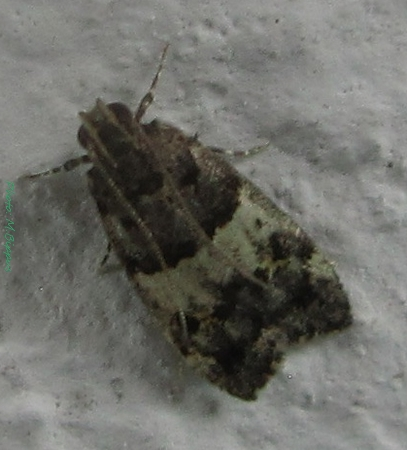

Scientific classification
- Kingdom: Animalia
- Phylum: Arthropoda
- Clade: Pancrustacea
- Class: Insecta
- Order: Lepidoptera
- Family: Oecophoridae
- Genus: Ancylometis
- Species: A. ribesae

Binomial name
- Ancylometis ribesae Viette & Guillermet, 1996

= Ancylometis ribesae =

Species of moth

Ancylometis ribesae is a species of moth in the family Oecophoridae. It is endemic to Réunion in the Indian Ocean, where it is very common.

It is of a very small size, approximately 4 by 8 mm.
