= Pseudoceroprepes semipectinella =

Scientific classification
- Kingdom: Animalia
- Phylum: Arthropoda
- Class: Insecta
- Order: Lepidoptera
- Family: Pyralidae
- Genus: Pseudoceroprepes
- Species: P. semipectinella

Binomial name
- Pseudoceroprepes semipectinella (Guenée, 1862)

Synonyms
- Phycis semipectinella Guenée, 1862; Mussidia semipectinella (Guenée, 1862)

Species of moth

Pseudoceroprepes semipectinella is a species of snout moth (family Pyralidae). It was described by Achille Guenée in 1862.

== Distribution ==
It is found on Réunion in the Indian Ocean.
