= Peritrichocera bipectinata =

Scientific classification
- Kingdom: Animalia
- Phylum: Arthropoda
- Class: Insecta
- Order: Lepidoptera
- Family: Carposinidae
- Genus: Peritrichocera
- Species: P. bipectinata

Binomial name
- Peritrichocera bipectinata Diakonoff, 1961

Species of moth

Peritrichocera bipectinata is a species of moth in the Carposinidae family. It is found on La Réunion.
