= Peritrichocera tsilaosa =

Scientific classification
- Kingdom: Animalia
- Phylum: Arthropoda
- Class: Insecta
- Order: Lepidoptera
- Family: Carposinidae
- Genus: Peritrichocera
- Species: P. tsilaosa

Binomial name
- Peritrichocera tsilaosa Viette, 1995

Species of moth

Peritrichocera tsilaosa is a species of moth in the Carposinidae family. It is found on La Réunion.
