= Thalassodes hyraria =

Scientific classification
- Kingdom: Animalia
- Phylum: Arthropoda
- Class: Insecta
- Order: Lepidoptera
- Family: Geometridae
- Genus: Thalassodes
- Species: T. hyraria

Binomial name
- Thalassodes hyraria Guenée, 1857

Species of moth

Thalassodes hyraria is a species of moth of the family Geometridae first described by Achille Guenée in 1857. It is found on Réunion in the Indian Ocean.

Its holotype is in bad condition at the French National Museum of Natural History. Guenée also mentioned in his original description that the holotype was in bad shape, and that this species is similar to Thalassodes quadraria with the only notable difference that the front is green, and the last articles of the palpus is longer and white.
