= Metantithyra =

Scientific classification
- Kingdom: Animalia
- Phylum: Arthropoda
- Class: Insecta
- Order: Lepidoptera
- Family: Xyloryctidae
- Genus: Metantithyra; Viette, 1957
- Species: M. silvestrella

Binomial name
- Metantithyra silvestrella Viette, 1957

Monotypic moth genus in family Xyloryctidae

Metantithyra silvestrella is a moth in the family Xyloryctidae, and the only species in the genus Metantithyra. The species and genus were both described by Pierre Viette in 1957 and are found on La Réunion.
