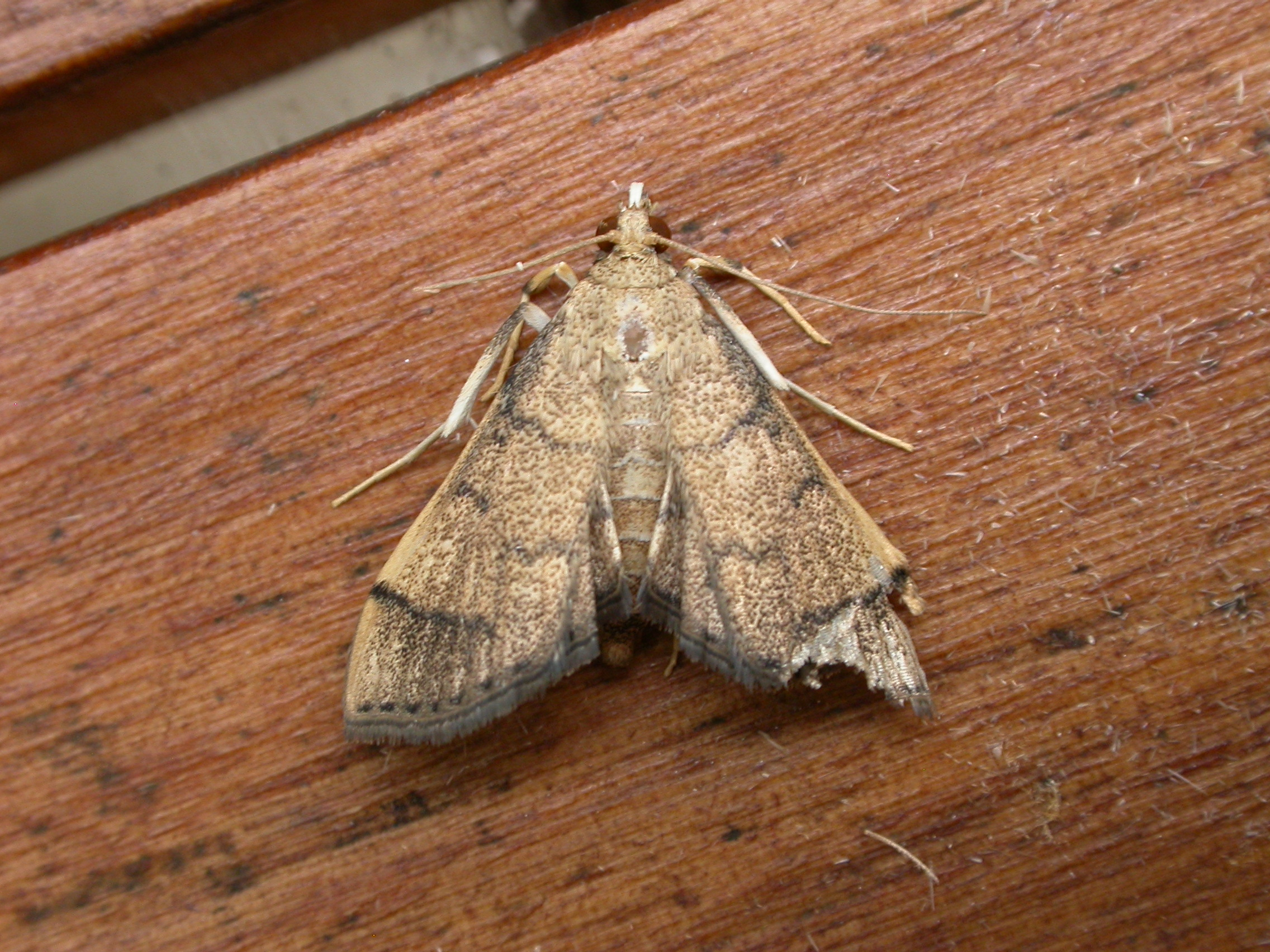

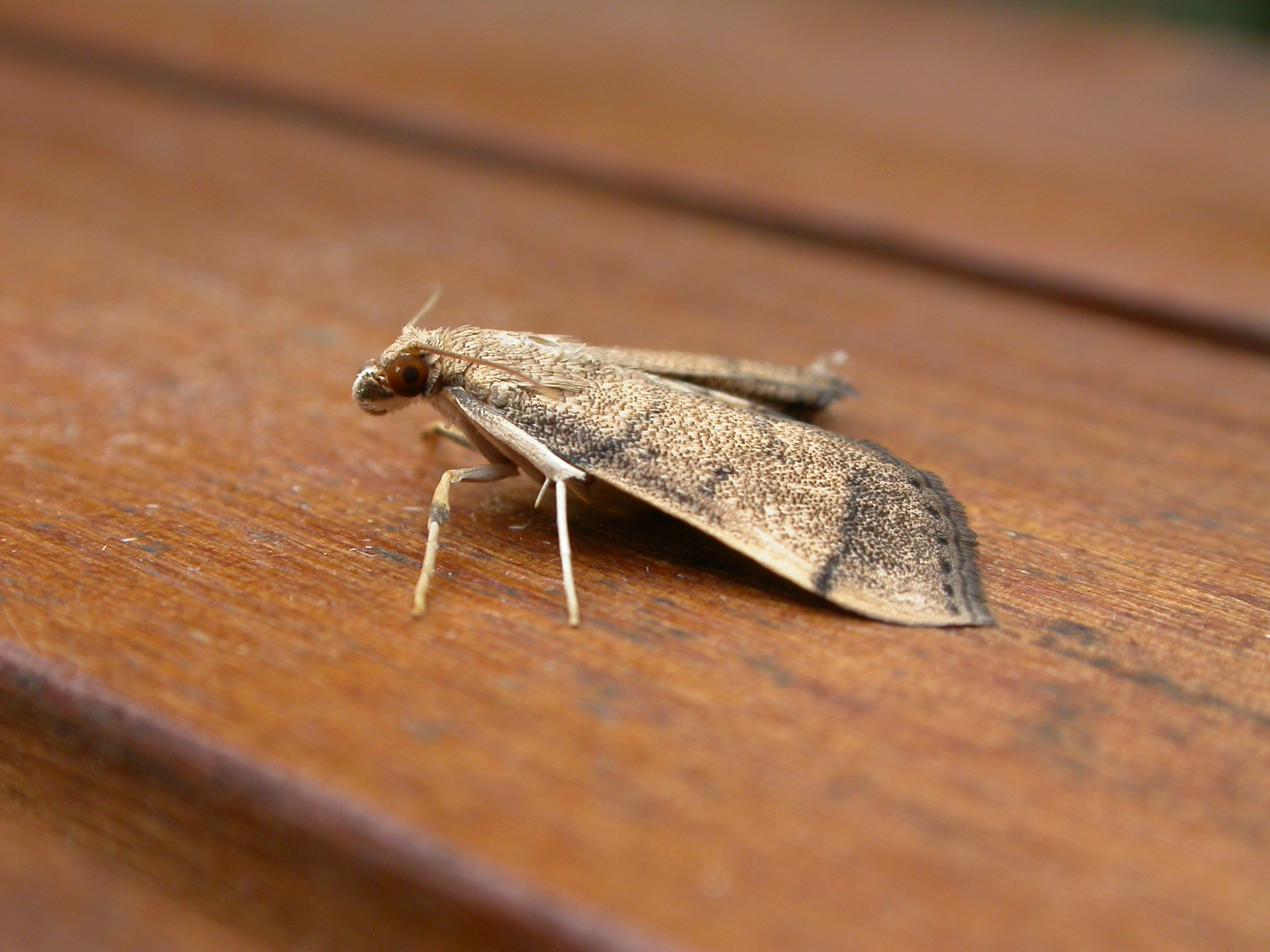

Scientific classification
- Kingdom: Animalia
- Phylum: Arthropoda
- Clade: Pancrustacea
- Class: Insecta
- Order: Lepidoptera
- Family: Crambidae
- Genus: Omiodes
- Species: O. indicata

Binomial name
- Omiodes indicata (Fabricius, 1775)

Synonyms
- Phalaena indicata Fabricius, 1775; Hedylepta indicata; Asopia vulgalis Guenée, 1854; Botis fortificalis Möschler, 1890; Botys connexalis Walker, 1866; Botys dolosalis Möschler, 1881; Botys moeliusalis Walker, 1859; Botys reductalis Walker, 1866; Botys sabalis Walker, 1859; Nacoleia indica ab. pigralis Dognin, 1909; Omiodes dnopheralis Mabille, 1900; Psara lionnetalis Legrand, 1966

= Omiodes indicata =

Species of moth

Omiodes indicata, the bean-leaf webworm moth or soybean leaf folder, is a species of moth of the family Crambidae. It is found from Florida to Texas, the West Indies and Mexico to South America, Cameroon, the Comoros, the Democratic Republic of Congo, La Réunion, Madagascar, Mauritius, Nigeria, Saudi Arabia, the Seychelles, South Africa, India, Borneo and Australia (Queensland).

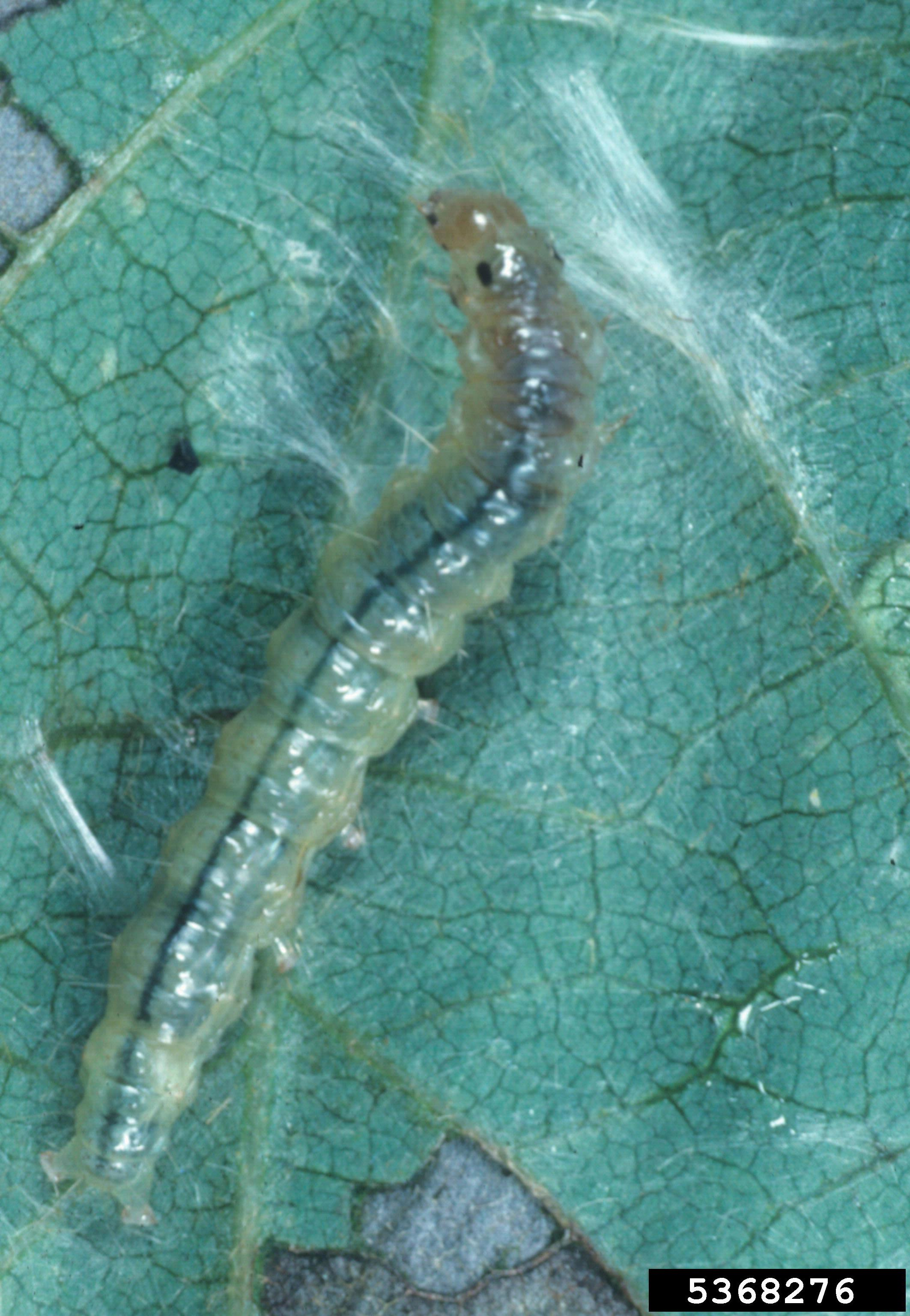
Larva

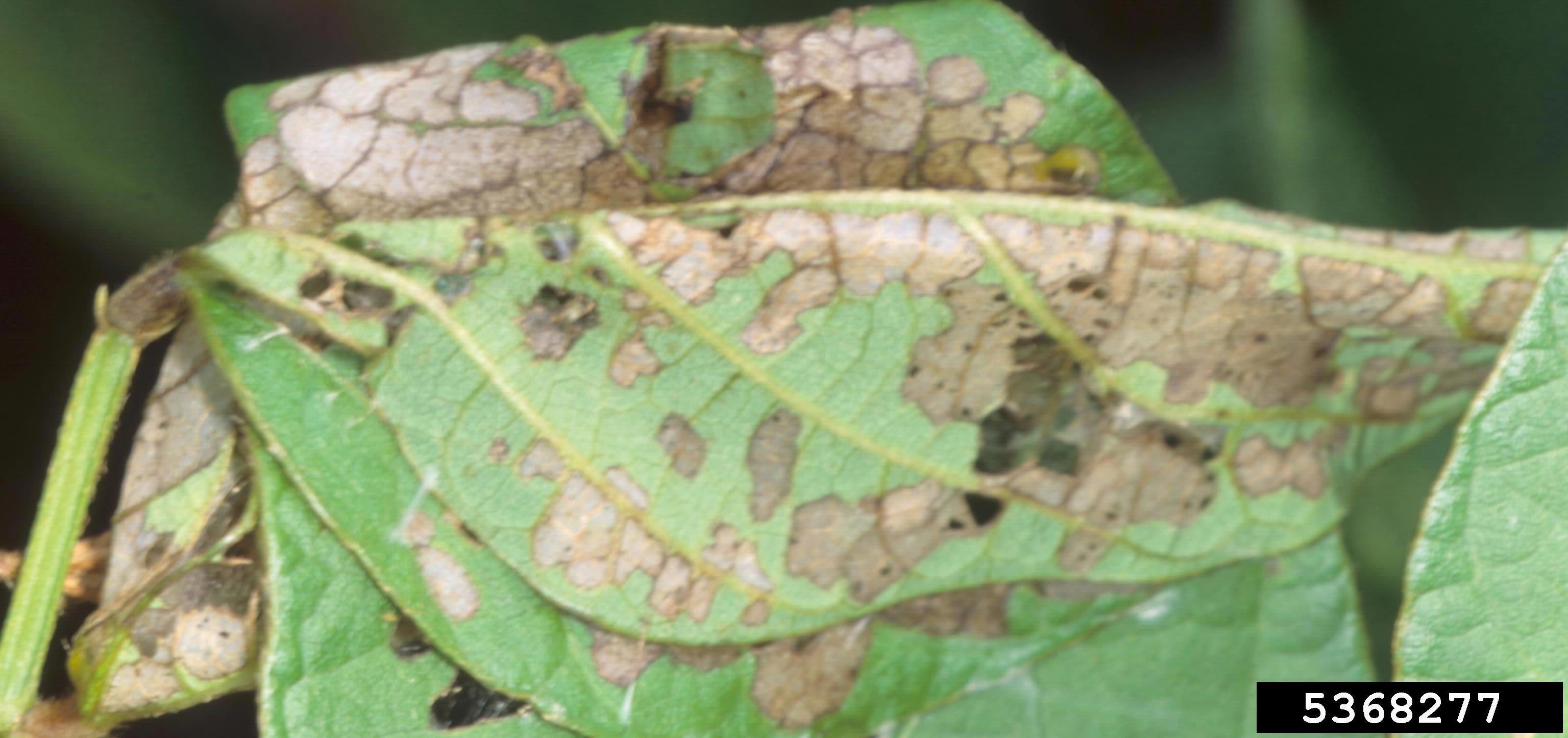
Damage

The wingspan is about 20 mm.
