= Tineovertex flavilineata =

Scientific classification
- Kingdom: Animalia
- Phylum: Arthropoda
- Class: Insecta
- Order: Lepidoptera
- Family: Tineidae
- Genus: Tineovertex
- Species: T. flavilineata

Binomial name
- Tineovertex flavilineata Bippus, 2016

Species of moth

Tineovertex flavilineata is a moth of the family Tineidae first described by Bippus in 2016. It is found in Réunion and Mauritius, it has a wingspan of 12–13 mm.
