= Agrotis viettei =

Scientific classification
- Kingdom: Animalia
- Phylum: Arthropoda
- Clade: Pancrustacea
- Class: Insecta
- Order: Lepidoptera
- Superfamily: Noctuoidea
- Family: Noctuidae
- Genus: Agrotis
- Species: A. viettei

Binomial name
- Agrotis viettei Orhant, 2003

Species of moth

Agrotis viettei is a moth of the family Noctuidae. It is found in Réunion, France.
