= Epiphractis amphitricha =

Scientific classification
- Kingdom: Animalia
- Phylum: Arthropoda
- Class: Insecta
- Order: Lepidoptera
- Family: Oecophoridae
- Genus: Epiphractis
- Species: E. amphitricha

Binomial name
- Epiphractis amphitricha Meyrick, 1910

Synonyms
- Orygocera amphitricha reunionensis Viette, 1988

Species of moth

Epiphractis amphitricha is a moth of the family Oecophoridae. It is known from the Indian Ocean islands of Mauritius and Réunion.

The wingspan is about 22 mm. The forewings are dull light brownish-crimson, with some scattered fuscous scales. There is an inwardly oblique purplish-fuscous streak from the dorsum beyond the middle, reaching three-fourths across the wing and a cloudy purplish-fuscous dot in the disc beyond two-thirds, and a short inwardly oblique streak from the tornus. The hindwings are ochreous-whitish, slightly crimson-tinged towards the termen and there is a long subcostal pencil of ochreous-whitish hairs lying along the upper margin of the cell beneath the forewings.

== Subspecies ==
- Epiphractis amphitricha amphitricha
- Epiphractis amphitricha reunionensis (Viette, 1988)
