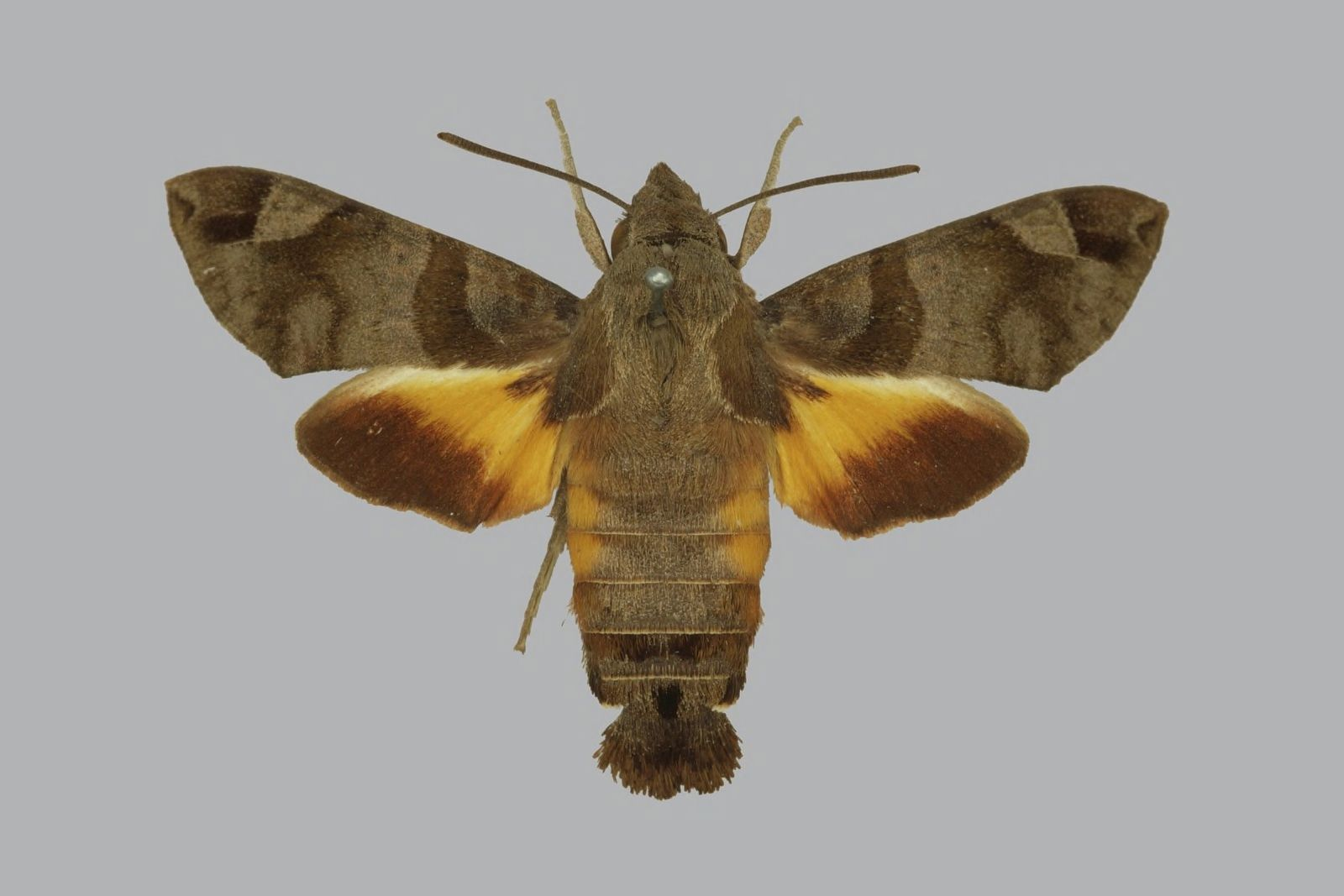
- Female museum specimen

Scientific classification
- Kingdom: Animalia
- Phylum: Arthropoda
- Class: Insecta
- Order: Lepidoptera
- Family: Sphingidae
- Genus: Macroglossum
- Species: M. aesalon

Binomial name
- Macroglossum aesalon Mabille, 1879

= Macroglossum aesalon =

Species of moth

Macroglossum aesalon is a moth of the family Sphingidae first described by Paul Mabille in 1879. It is known from Madagascar, Mauritius and the Comoro Islands.

The abdomen upperside has four orange lateral patches, the first and fourth generally small. There is also a black mesial spot at the base of the anal brush. The palpus is white, shaded with brown scales and the thorax underside is brown, clayish in the middle. The abdomen underside is either tawny with a series of more or less confluent brown patches at each side, nearly all tawny or brown with three series of tawny patches. The forewing upperside has two oblique antemedian lines, the space between more or less filled up with black scaling. The hindwing upperside has a brownish black base. The median band is broad and yellowish-orange. The distal part of the wing is blackish brown, becoming purple-brown on the disc. The hindwing underside is yellow at the extreme base and inner margin. There are three discal lines present.

== Subspecies ==
- Macroglossum aesalon aesalon
- Macroglossum aesalon sainsoni Turlin, 1996 (Comoro Islands)
