= Ancylometis scaeocosma =

Scientific classification
- Kingdom: Animalia
- Phylum: Arthropoda
- Class: Insecta
- Order: Lepidoptera
- Family: Oecophoridae
- Genus: Ancylometis
- Species: A. scaeocosma

Binomial name
- Ancylometis scaeocosma Meyrick, 1887

Species of moth

Ancylometis scaeocosma is a species of moth in the family Oecophoridae first described by Edward Meyrick in 1887. It is known from Réunion.

This species has a wingspan of 11 mm for the male. The head and palpi are dark fuscous, antennae greyish-ochreous, thorax and abdomen greyish-ochreous, irrorated (sprinkled) with dark fuscous. The forewings are elongated and rather narrow with a gently arched costa; they are whitish-ochreous, irrorated with dark fuscous, tinged with yellowish round dark markings, and a small dark fuscous basal patch. The hindwings are grey, paler and semi-transparent towards their base.
