= List of moths of Mauritius =

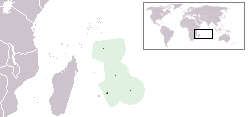
Location of Mauritius

There are about 450 known moth species of Mauritius. The moths (mostly nocturnal) and butterflies (mostly diurnal) together make up the taxonomic order Lepidoptera.

This is a list of moth species which have been recorded in Mauritius.

== Arctiidae ==
- Amerila vidua (Cramer, 1780)
- Argina astrea (Drury, 1773)
- Eilema squalida (Guenée, 1862)
- Leucaloa infragyrea (Saalmüller, 1891)
- Maculonaclia florida (de Joannis, 1906)
- Nyctemera insulare (Boisduval, 1833)
- Utetheisa cruentata (Butler, 1881)
- Utetheisa elata (Fabricius, 1798)
- Utetheisa pulchella (Linnaeus, 1758)
- Utetheisa pulchelloides Hampson, 1907

== Batrachedridae ==
- Batrachedra arenosella (Walker, 1864)
- Idioglossa bigemma Walsingham, 1881

== Bedelliidae ==
- Bedellia somnulentella (Zeller, 1847)

== Choreutidae ==
- Anthophila ialeura (Meyrick, 1912)
- Anthophila turilega (Meyrick, 1924)
- Brenthia leptocosma Meyrick, 1916
- Tebenna micalis (Mann, 1857)

== Copromorphidae ==
- Copromorpha aeruginea Meyrick, 1917

== Cosmopterigidae ==
- Anatrachyntis coriacella (Snellen, 1901)
- Anatrachyntis incertulella (Walker, 1864)
- Anatrachyntis rileyi (Walsinham, 1882)
- Cosmopterix attenuatella (Walker, 1864)
- Cosmopterix dacryodes Meyrick, 1910
- Eteobalea vinsoni (Viette, 1953)

== Crambidae ==
- Agathodes musivalis Guenée, 1854
- Angustalius hapaliscus (Zeller, 1852)
- Bocchoris inspersalis (Zeller, 1852)
- Chilo sacchariphagus (Bojer, 1856)
- Cirrhochrista nivea (de Joannis, 1932)
- Cnaphalocrocis poeyalis (Boisduval, 1833)
- Cnaphalocrocis trapezalis (Guenée, 1854)
- Conocramboides seychellellus (T. B. Fletcher, 1910)
- Cotachena smaragdina (Butler, 1875)
- Crocidolomia pavonana (Fabricius, 1794)
- Culladia achroellum (Mabille, 1900)
- Culladia inconspicuellus (Snellen, 1872)
- Diaphana indica (Saunders, 1851)
- Eoophyla reunionalis (Viette, 1988)
- Parapoynx fluctuosalis (Zeller, 1852)
- Eurrhyparodes bracteolalis (Zeller, 1852)
- Glyphodes mascarenalis de Joannis, 1906
- Glyphodes shafferorum Viette, 1987
- Hellula undalis (Fabricius, 1781)
- Herpetogramma phaeopteralis (Guenée, 1854)
- Ischnurges lancinalis (Guenée, 1854)
- Maruca vitrata (Fabricius, 1787)
- Nausinoe geometralis (Guenée, 1854)
- Nomophila noctuella ([Denis & Schiffermüller], 1775)
- Notarcha quaternalis (Zeller, 1852)
- Omiodes indicata (Fabricius, 1775)
- Orphanostigma abruptalis (Walker, 1859)
- Pagyda pulvereiumbralis (Hampson, 1918)
- Palpita unionalis (Hübner, 1796)
- Parapoynx diminutalis (Snellen, 1880)
- Psara minoralis (Warren, 1892)
- Pyrausta childrenalis (Boisduval, 1833)
- Pyrausta pastrinalis (Guenée, 1862)
- Pyrausta phaenicealis (Hübner, 1818)
- Salbia haemorrhoidalis Guenée 1854
- Scoparia benigna Meyrick, 1910
- Spoladea recurvalis (Fabricius, 1775)
- Stemorrhages sericea (Drury, 1773)
- Udea ferrugalis (Hübner, 1796)
- Zebronia phenice (Cramer, 1780)

== Elachistidae ==
- Orophia thesmophila (Meyrick, 1930)

== Gelechiidae ==
- Anarsia citromitra Meyrick, 1921
- Anarsia vinsonella Viette, 1957
- Bilobata subsecivella (Zeller, 1852)
- Brachmia convolvuli Walsingham, 1907
- Dichomeris acuminata (Staudinger, 1876)
- Dichomeris hortulana (Meyrick, 1918)
- Mesophleps palpigera (Walsingham, 1891)
- Phthorimaea operculella (Zeller, 1873)
- Sitotroga cerealella (Olivier, 1789)
- Thiognatha mameti Viette, 1953
- Thiotricha tenuis (Walsingham, 1891)

== Geometridae ==
- Ascotis antelmaria (Mabille, 1893)
- Camelopteryx multicolor de Joannis, 1906
- Casuariclystis latifascia (Walker, 1866)
- Chloroclystis costicavata de Joannis, 1932
- Chloroclystis derasata (Bastelberger, 1905)
- Chloroclystis exilipicta de Joannis, 1906
- Chloroclystis latifasciata de Joannis, 1932
- Comostolopsis viridellaria (Mabille, 1898)
- Darisodes orygaria (Guenée, 1862)
- Disclisioprocta natalata (Walker, 1862)
- Dithecodes purpuraria de Joannis, 1932
- Ectropis distinctaria (de Joannis, 1915)
- Ectropis herbuloti Orhant, 2003
- Erastria madecassaria (Boisduval, 1833)
- Gymnoscelis rubricata (de Joannis, 1932)
- Hypomecis atrilunaria (Mabille, 1893)
- Mimandria diospyrata (Boisduval, 1833)
- Orthonama quadrisecta Herbulot, 1954
- Pingasa hypoleucaria (Guenée, 1862)
- Scopula caesaria (Walker, 1861)
- Scopula minorata (Boisduval, 1833)
- Thalassodes quadraria Guenée, 1857
- Xanthorhoe eugraphata (de Joannis, 1915)

== Glyphipterigidae ==
- Glyphipterix ditiorana Walker, 1863

== Gracillariidae ==
- Acrocercops macrochalca Meyrick, 1910
- Aspilapteryx pentaplaca (Meyrick, 1911)
- Callicercops triceros (Meyrick, 1926)
- Macarostola eugeniella (Viette, 1951)
- Phodoryctis caerulea (Meyrick, 1912)
- Phodoryctis dolichophila (Vári, 1961)
- Phyllocnistis citrella Stainton, 1856
- Phyllonorycter trochetellus de Prins, 2012

== Immidae ==
- Imma infima Meyrick, 1930

== Lyonetiidae ==
- Lyonetia carcinota Meyrick, 1910

== Noctuidae ==
- Achaea catella Guenée, 1852
- Achaea finita (Guenée, 1852)
- Achaea infinita (Guenée, 1852)
- Achaea lienardi (Boisduval, 1833)
- Achaea trapezoides (Guenée, 1862)
- Achaea umbrigera Mabille, 1898
- Achaea violaceofascia (Saalmüller, 1891)
- Agrotis ipsilon (Hufnagel, 1766)
- Aletia consanguis (Guenée, 1852)
- Aletia infrargyrea (Saalmüller, 1891)
- Aletia pyrausta (Hampson, 1913)
- Amyna axis Guenée, 1852
- Anomis flava (Fabricius, 1775)
- Anomis lophognatha Hampson, 1926
- Anticarsia rubricans (Boisduval, 1833)
- Araeopteron obliquifascia de Joannis, 1910
- Argyrogramma signata (Fabricius, 1775)
- Argyrolopha costibarbata Hampson, 1914
- Asota borbonica (Boisduval, 1833)
- Athetis ignava (Guenée, 1852)
- Athetis pigra (Guenée, 1852)
- Autoba costimacula (Saalmüller, 1880)
- Brithys crini (Fabricius, 1775)
- Callopistria cariei (de Joannis, 1915)
- Callopistria maillardi (Guenée, 1862)
- Catada obscura de Joannis, 1906
- Cerynea tetramelanosticta Berio, 1954
- Chalciope delta (Boisduval, 1833)
- Chrysodeixis chalcites (Esper, 1789)
- Condica pauperata (Walker, 1858)
- Conservula cinisigna de Joannis, 1906
- Corgatha terracotta de Joannis, 1910
- Ctenoplusia dorfmeisteri (Felder & Rogenhofer, 1874)
- Ctenoplusia limbirena (Guenée, 1852)
- Cyligramma fluctuosa (Drury, 1773)
- Cyligramma limacina (Guérin-Méneville, 1832)
- Digama septempuncta Hampson, 1910
- Diastema tigris Guenée 1854
- Dysgonia angularis (Boisduval, 1833)
- Dysgonia torrida (Guenée, 1852)
- Erebus walkeri (Butler, 1875)
- Ericeia congregata (Walker, 1858)
- Ericeia congressa (Walker, 1858)
- Eublemma cochylioides (Guenée, 1852)
- Eublemmoides apicimacula (Mabille, 1880)
- Eutelia blandiatrix (Guenée, 1852)
- Eutelia discitriga Walker, 1865
- Eutelia geraea Hampson, 1905
- Gesonia obeditalis Walker, 1859
- Gracilodes nysa Guenée, 1852
- Grammodes bifasciata (Petagna, 1787)
- Gyrtona polymorpha Hampson, 1905
- Helicoverpa armigera (Hübner, [1808])
- Hydrillodes bryophiloides (Butler, 1876)
- Hypena conscitalis Walker, 1866
- Hypena gravalis Mabille, 1898
- Hypena hemiphaea de Joannis, 1915
- Hypena laceratalis Walker, 1859
- Hypena muscosoides Poole, 1989
- Hypena obacerralis Walker, [1859]
- Hypena varialis Walker, 1866
- Janseodes melanospila (Guenée, 1852)
- Leucania insulicola Guenée, 1852
- Leucania nebulosa Hampson, 1902
- Leucania phaea Hampson, 1902
- Lophoruza mascarena de Joannis, 1910
- Lophotavia incivilis Walker, 1865
- Maxera marchalii (Boisduval, 1833)
- Mocis conveniens (Walker, 1858)
- Mocis frugalis (Fabricius, 1775)
- Mocis mayeri (Boisduval, 1833)
- Mocis proverai Zilli, 2000
- Mythimna borbonensis Guillermet, 1996
- Nagia linteola (Guenée, 1852)
- Neostichtis ignorata Viette, 1958
- Neostichtis nigricostata (Hampson, 1908)
- Oedebasis longipalpis (Berio, 1959)
- Ophiusa tirhaca (Cramer, 1777)
- Oruza divisa (Walker, 1862)
- Pericyma mendax (Walker, 1858)
- Pericyma vinsonii (Guenée, 1862)
- Polydesma umbricola Boisduval, 1833
- Progonia oileusalis (Walker, 1859)
- Prominea porrecta (Saalmüller, 1880)
- Rhesala moestalis (Walker, 1866)
- Rivula dispar de Joannis, 1915
- Serrodes trispila (Mabille, 1890)
- Sesamia calamistis Hampson, 1910
- Simplicia extinctalis (Zeller, 1852)
- Simplicia inflexalis Guenée, 1854
- Spodoptera cilium Guenée, 1852
- Spodoptera littoralis (Boisduval, 1833)
- Spodoptera mauritia (Boisduval, 1833)
- Thysanoplusia indicator (Walker, [1858])
- Tolna sypnoides (Butler, 1878)
- Trichoplusia orichalcea (Fabricius, 1775)
- Trigonodes hyppasia (Cramer, 1779)
- Vittaplusia vittata (Wallengren, 1856)

== Nolidae ==
- Earias biplaga Walker, 1866
- Earias insulana (Boisduval, 1833)
- Nola denauxi Orhant, 2003
- Nycteola mauritia (de Joannis, 1906)
- Pardasena virgulana (Mabille, 1880)
- Pardoxia graellsii (Feisthamel, 1837)

== Oecophoridae ==
- Ancylometis dilucida Meyrick, 1910
- Ancylometis metacrocota Meyrick, 1930
- Ancylometis phylotypa Meyrick, 1930
- Ancylometis trigonodes Meyrick, 1887
- Cenarchis capitolina Meyrick, 1924
- Cenarchis celebrata Meyrick, 1924
- Cenarchis liopsamma Meyrick, 1924
- Cenarchis plectrophora Meyrick, 1924
- Cenarchis priscata Meyrick, 1924
- Cenarchis vesana Meyrick, 1924
- Cenarchis veterata Meyrick, 1924
- Epiphractis amphitricha Meyrick, 1910
- Epiphractis tryphoxantha Meyrick, 1930
- Hypercallia haematella Felder, 1875
- Metachanda astrapias (Meyrick, 1887)
- Metachanda baryscias Meyrick, 1930
- Metachanda brachychlaena Meyrick, 1930
- Metachanda declinata Meyrick, 1924
- Metachanda drypsolitha Meyrick, 1930
- Metachanda eophaea Meyrick, 1930
- Metachanda fimbriata (Meyrick, 1910)
- Metachanda gymnosopha Meyrick, 1930
- Metachanda holombra Meyrick, 1930
- Metachanda larochroa Meyrick, 1930
- Metachanda malevola Meyrick, 1924
- Metachanda oxyphrontis Meyrick, 1930
- Metachanda ptilodoxa Meyrick, 1930
- Metachanda sublevata Meyrick, 1924
- Metachanda taphrospila Meyrick, 1930
- Metachanda thaleropis Meyrick, 1911
- Metachanda trisemanta Meyrick, 1930
- Orygocera lenobapta Meyrick, 1924
- Oxycrates fulvoradiella Legrand, 1966
- Oxycrates longodivisella Legrand, 1966
- Oxycrates xanthopeda Meyrick, 1930
- Semnocosma necromantis Meyrick, 1924
- Tanychastis lysigama Meyrick, 1910
- Taragmarcha filicincta Meyrick, 1930
- Taragmarcha glutinata Meyrick, 1930
- Taragmarcha laqueata Meyrick, 1910

== Plutellidae ==
- Helenodes platyacma Meyrick, 1930
- Plutella xylostella (Linnaeus, 1758)

== Pterophoridae ==
- Exelastis phlyctaenias Meyrick, 1911
- Lantanophaga pusillidactylus (Walker, 1864)
- Megalorhipida leucodactylus (Fabricius, 1794)
- Oidaematophorus mauritius Gibeaux, 1994
- Oxyptilus epidectis Meyrick, 1908
- Platyptilia censoria Meyrick, 1910
- Platyptilia fulva Bigot, 1964
- Platyptilia molopias Meyrick, 1906
- Platyptilia vinsoni Gibeaux, 1994
- Sphenarches anisodactylus (Walker, 1864)
- Sphenarches caffer (Zeller, 1851)
- Stenodacma wahlbergi (Zeller, 1852)
- Stenoptilodes taprobanes (Felder & Rogenhofer, 1875)

== Pyralidae ==
=== Chrysauginae ===
- Parachma lequettealis Guillermet, 2011

=== Galleriinae ===
- Corcyra cephalonica (Stainton, 1866)
- Lamoria clathrella (Ragonot, 1888)

=== Phycitinae ===
- Cadra cautella (Walker, 1863)
- Cactoblastis cactorum (Berg, 1885)
- Ceutholopha isidis (ZELLER, 1867)
- Etiella zinckenella (Treitschke, 1832)
- Hypargyria metalliferella Ragonot, 1888
- Hypsipyla grandella (Zeller, 1848)
- Hypsipyla robusta (Moore, 1886)
- Maliarpha separatella vectiferella (Ragonot, 1901)
- Morosaphycita morosalis (Saalmüller, 1880)
- Mussidia irisella (Guenée, 1862)
- Pempelia strophocomma (de Joannis, 1932)
- Phycita diaphana (Staudinger, 1870)
- Phycita demidovi Guillermet, 2007
- Spatulipalpia pectinatella de Joannis, 1915

=== Pyralinae ===
- Hypotia saramitoi (Guillermet, 1996)
- Hypsopygia mauritialis (Boisduval, 1833)
- Pyralis manihotalis Guenée, 1854
- Ocrasa nostralis (Guenée, 1854)

== Sphingidae ==
- Acherontia atropos (Linnaeus, 1758)
- Agrius convolvuli (Linnaeus, 1758)
- Cephonodes apus (Boisduval, 1833)
- Cephonodes trochilus (Guérin-Méneville, 1843)
- Coelonia fulvinotata (Butler, 1875)
- Coelonia solani (Boisduval, 1833)
- Daphnis nerii (Linnaeus, 1758)
- Euchloron megaera (Linnaeus, 1758)
- Hippotion celerio (Linnaeus, 1758)
- Hippotion eson (Cramer, 1779)
- Macroglossum aesalon Mabille, 1879
- Macroglossum milvus (Boisduval, 1833)
- Macroglossum soror Rothschild & Jordan, 1903
- Nephele oenopion (Hübner, [1824])

== Thyrididae ==
- Banisia clathrula (Guenée, 1877)
- Hapana carcealis Whalley, 1971

== Tineidae ==
- Amphixystis aethalopis (Meyrick, 1930)
- Amphixystis canthopa (Meyrick, 1924)
- Amphixystis chrysodora (Meyrick, 1924)
- Amphixystis crocinacma (Meyrick, 1930)
- Amphixystis crypsirias (Meyrick, 1930)
- Amphixystis fragosa (Meyrick, 1910)
- Amphixystis hydrochalca (Meyrick, 1930)
- Amphixystis pentacarpa (Meyrick, 1910)
- Amphixystis sciadocoma (Meyrick, 1924)
- Amphixystis serrata (Meyrick, 1914)
- Amphixystis siccata (Meyrick, 1910)
- Amphixystis spathistis (Meyrick, 1930)
- Amphixystis syntricha (Meyrick, 1910)
- Amphixystis trixysta (Meyrick, 1910)
- Archyala pagetodes (Meyrick, 1911)
- Erechthias zebrina (Butler, 1881)
- Eudarcia oceanica Bippus, 2020
- Ogmocoma pharmacista Meyrick, 1924
- Opogona autogama (Meyrick, 1911)
- Opogona iridogramma Meyrick, 1924
- Opogona omoscopa (Meyrick, 1893)
- Opogona phaeochalca Meyrick, 1908
- Opogona sacchari (Bojer, 1856)
- Praeacedes despecta (Meyrick, 1919)
- Protaphreutis antipyla Meyrick, 1930
- Protaphreutis borboniella (Boisduval, 1833)
- Protaphreutis brasmatias Meyrick, 1930
- Protaphreutis cubitalis (Meyrick, 1910)
- Protaphreutis leucopsamma Meyrick, 1930
- Protaphreutis sauroderma Meyrick, 1930
- Scalmatica malacista (Meyrick, 1924)
- Setomorpha rutella Zeller, 1852
- Tinea saltatrix Meyrick, 1930
- Tineovertex flavilineata Bippus, 2016

== Tortricidae ==
- Adoxophyes ergatica Meyrick, 1911
- Adoxophyes telestica Meyrick, 1930
- Bactra stagnicolana Zeller, 1852
- Bactra transvola Meyrick, 1924
- Borboniella discruciata (Meyrick, 1930)
- Borboniella rosacea Diakonoff, 1960
- Brachiolia amblopis (Meyrick, 1911)
- Brachiolia egenella (Walker, 1864)
- Bubonoxena ephippias (Meyrick, 1907)
- Coniostola calculosa (Meyrick, 1913)
- Cosmetra spiculifera (Meyrick, 1913)
- Cosmorrhyncha acrocosma (Meyrick, 1908)
- Crocidosema plebejana Zeller, 1847
- Cryptophlebia peltastica (Meyrick, 1921)
- Cryptophlebia rhynchias (Meyrick, 1905)
- Cryptophlebia semilunana (Saalmüller, 1880)
- Cryptophlebia williamsi Bradley, 1953
- Eccopsis incultana (Walker, 1863)
- Grapholita atrana (Mabille, 1900)
- Grapholita delineana Walker, 1863
- Grapholita molesta (Busck, 1916)
- Leguminivora anthracotis (Meyrick, 1913)
- Lobesia embrithes Diakonoff, 1961
- Lobesia oxypercna (Meyrick, 1930)
- Mystogenes astatopa Meyrick, 1930
- Olethreutes symmictopa (Meyrick, 1930)
- Procrica sanidota (Meyrick, 1912)
- Spilonota sinuosa Meyrick, 1917
- Strepsicrates rhothia (Meyrick, 1910)
- Tetramoera schistaceana (Snellen, 1891)
- Thaumatotibia ecnomia (Diakonoff, 1974)
- Thaumatotibia leucotreta (Meyrick, 1913)
- Tortrix ochnotoma Meyrick, 1930

== Uraniidae ==
- Dirades theclata (Guenée, 1858)
- Epiplema melanosticta de Joannis, 1915

== Yponomeutidae ==
- Xyrosaris obtorta Meyrick, 1924
