= Metachanda crypsitricha =

Scientific classification
- Kingdom: Animalia
- Phylum: Arthropoda
- Class: Insecta
- Order: Lepidoptera
- Family: Oecophoridae
- Genus: Metachanda
- Species: M. crypsitricha

Binomial name
- Metachanda crypsitricha Meyrick, 1911

Species of moth in genus Metachanda

Metachanda crypsitricha is a moth species in the oecophorine tribe Metachandini. It was described by Edward Meyrick in 1911. Its type locality is Mahé Island, Seychelles. It also occurs on Silhouette Island and Anonyme Island, both also part of Seychelles.
