= Metachanda autocentra =

Scientific classification
- Kingdom: Animalia
- Phylum: Arthropoda
- Class: Insecta
- Order: Lepidoptera
- Family: Oecophoridae
- Genus: Metachanda
- Species: M. autocentra

Binomial name
- Metachanda autocentra Meyrick, 1911

Species of moth in genus Metachanda

Metachanda autocentra is a moth species in the oecophorine tribe Metachandini. It was described by Edward Meyrick in 1911.

Its type locality is Silhouette Island, Seychelles. It is also known from Félicité, another island of Seychelles.
