= Metachanda fortunata =

Scientific classification
- Kingdom: Animalia
- Phylum: Arthropoda
- Class: Insecta
- Order: Lepidoptera
- Family: Oecophoridae
- Genus: Metachanda
- Species: M. fortunata

Binomial name
- Metachanda fortunata Meyrick, 1911

Species of moth in genus Metachanda

Metachanda fortunata is a moth species in the oecophorine tribe Metachandini. It was described by Edward Meyrick in 1911. Its type locality is Mahé Island, Seychelles. The species also occurs on the Silhouette, Curieuse and Félicité islands of Seychelles.
