= Metachanda classica =

Scientific classification
- Kingdom: Animalia
- Phylum: Arthropoda
- Class: Insecta
- Order: Lepidoptera
- Family: Oecophoridae
- Genus: Metachanda
- Species: M. classica

Binomial name
- Metachanda classica Meyrick, 1911

Species of moth in genus Metachanda

Metachanda classica is a moth species in the oecophorine tribe Metachandini. It was described by Edward Meyrick in 1911. Its type locality is on Mahé Island, Seychelles. It also occurs on Silhouette Island.
