= Thiognatha =

Scientific classification
- Domain: Eukaryota
- Kingdom: Animalia
- Phylum: Arthropoda
- Class: Insecta
- Order: Lepidoptera
- Family: Gelechiidae
- Subfamily: Gelechiinae
- Genus: Thiognatha; Meyrick, 1920

Genus of moths

Thiognatha is a genus of moth in the family Gelechiidae.

== Species ==
- Thiognatha mameti Viette, 1953 (from Mauritius)
- Thiognatha metachalca Meyrick, 1920 (from Kenya)

== See also ==
- List of moths of Kenya
- List of moths of Mauritius
