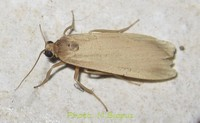

Scientific classification
- Kingdom: Animalia
- Phylum: Arthropoda
- Class: Insecta
- Order: Lepidoptera
- Superfamily: Noctuoidea
- Family: Erebidae
- Subfamily: Arctiinae
- Genus: Eilema
- Species: E. squalida

Binomial name
- Eilema squalida (Guenée, 1862)

Synonyms
- Lithosia mauritia Mabille, 1899; Lithosia squalida Guenée, 1862

= Eilema squalida =

Species of moth

Eilema squalida is a moth of the subfamily Arctiinae first described by Achille Guenée in 1862. It is found in Mauritius and Réunion, both in the Indian Ocean.

This species has a wingspan of about 40 mm.

== See also ==
- List of moths of Réunion
- List of moths of Mauritius
