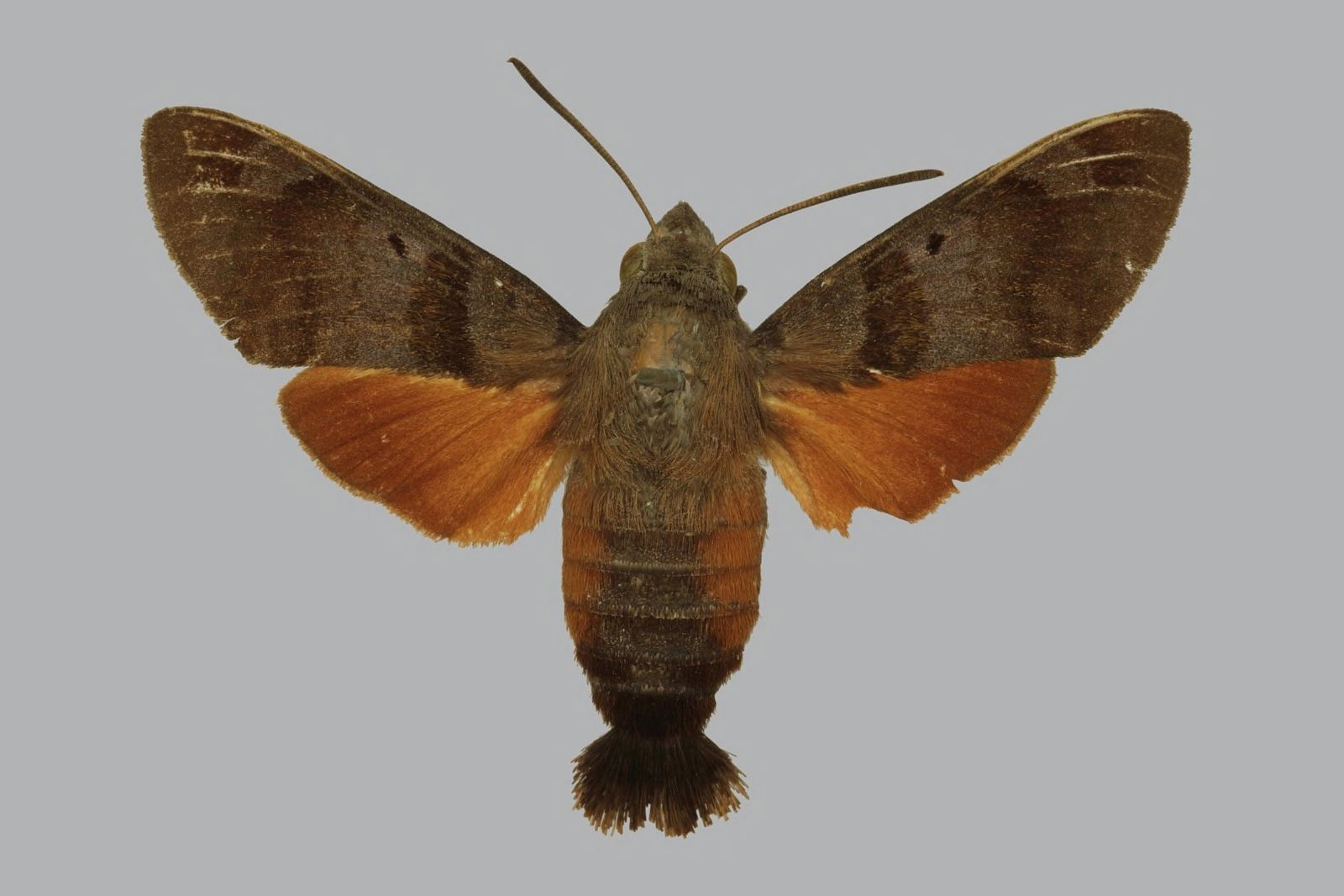

Scientific classification
- Kingdom: Animalia
- Phylum: Arthropoda
- Class: Insecta
- Order: Lepidoptera
- Family: Sphingidae
- Genus: Macroglossum
- Species: M. soror

Binomial name
- Macroglossum soror Rothschild & Jordan, 1903

= Macroglossum soror =

Species of moth

Macroglossum soror is a moth of the family Sphingidae. It is known from Réunion (formerly known as Île Bourbon).

It is similar to Macroglossum milvus and Macroglossum alluaudi. There are four large, deep rust-coloured lateral patches on the abdomen that are not separated from one another. The forewing upperside has a discal spot which is rather large. The hindwing upperside is reddish orange, shaded with rust distally, without a yellow band, the base is not darker than the middle of the wing. The fringe is pale brown.
