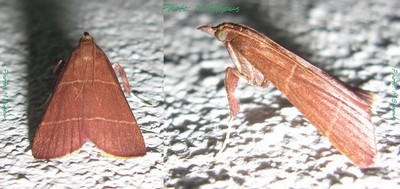
- Parachma lequettealis

Scientific classification
- Kingdom: Animalia
- Phylum: Arthropoda
- Class: Insecta
- Order: Lepidoptera
- Family: Pyralidae
- Subfamily: Chrysauginae
- Genus: Parachma; Walker, 1866

Synonyms
- Zazaca Walker, 1866; Perseis Ragonot, 1891; Artopsis Dyar, 1908

= Parachma =

Genus of moths

Parachma is a genus of snout moths. This genus is allied to Caphys Walker, 1863 Acallis Ragonot, 1891 and Zabobar Dyar, 1914.

== Species ==
- Parachma atripunctalis Hampson 1906
- Parachma dilutior Rothschild 1913
- Parachma fervidalis Dyar, 1914
- Parachma huralis Dyar 1914
- Parachma ignefusalis Hampson 1906
- Parachma lutealis Hampson, 1897
- Parachma meterythra Hampson, 1897
- Parachma lequettealis Guillermot, 2011
- Parachma ochracealis Walker, 1866
- Parachma pallidalis Hampson 1906
- Parachma phoenicochroa Hampson 1916
- Parachma rufitinctalis Hampson 1916
- Parachma rufoflavalis Hampson 1906
- Parachma thermalis Hampson 1906

All moths of this species occur in the Americas, except P.laquettealis from La Réunion (Indian Ocean).

== Former species ==
- Basacallis tarachodes (Dyar, 1914)
