= Orphanostigma perfulvalis =

Scientific classification
- Kingdom: Animalia
- Phylum: Arthropoda
- Class: Insecta
- Order: Lepidoptera
- Family: Crambidae
- Genus: Orphanostigma
- Species: O. perfulvalis

Binomial name
- Orphanostigma perfulvalis (Hampson, 1899)

Synonyms
- Pyrausta perfulvalis Hampson, 1899

Species of moth

Orphanostigma perfulvalis is a moth in the family Crambidae. It was described by George Hampson in 1899. It is found in Australia, where it has been recorded from Queensland.
