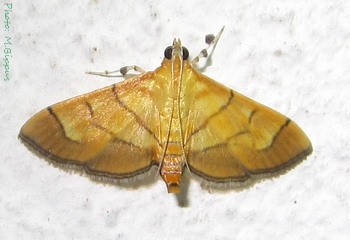
- Orphanostigma abruptalis

Scientific classification
- Kingdom: Animalia
- Phylum: Arthropoda
- Class: Insecta
- Order: Lepidoptera
- Family: Crambidae
- Subfamily: Spilomelinae
- Genus: Orphanostigma; Warren, 1890

Synonyms
- Orphanostagma J. C. Shaffer & Munroe, 2007

= Orphanostigma =

Genus of moths

Orphanostigma is a genus of moths of the family Crambidae described by William Warren in 1890.

== Species ==
- Orphanostigma abruptalis (Walker, 1859)
- Orphanostigma angustale Hampson, 1893
- Orphanostigma excisa (E. L. Martin, 1956)
- Orphanostigma fulvistriga Swinhoe, 1894
- Orphanostigma haemorrhoidalis (Guenée, 1854)
- Orphanostigma perfulvalis (Hampson, 1899)
- Orphanostigma vibiusalis (Walker, 1859)
