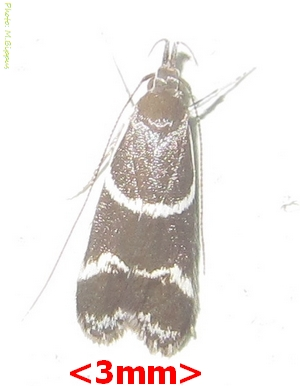
- Taragmarcha laqueata borbonensis

Scientific classification
- Kingdom: Animalia
- Phylum: Arthropoda
- Class: Insecta
- Order: Lepidoptera
- Family: Oecophoridae
- Genus: Taragmarcha; Meyrick, 1910

= Taragmarcha =

Genus of moths

Taragmarcha is a genus of moths in the family Oecophoridae. The species of this genus are found on the Indian Ocean islands of Mauritius and Réunion.

== Species ==
- Taragmarcha borbonensis Viette, 1957
- Taragmarcha filicincta Meyrick, 1930
- Taragmarcha glutinata Meyrick, 1930
- Taragmarcha laqueata Meyrick, 1910
