= Metachanda hugotella =

Scientific classification
- Kingdom: Animalia
- Phylum: Arthropoda
- Class: Insecta
- Order: Lepidoptera
- Family: Oecophoridae
- Genus: Metachanda
- Species: M. hugotella

Binomial name
- Metachanda hugotella Viette, 1957

Species of moth in genus Metachanda

Metachanda hugotella is a moth species in the oecophorine tribe Metachandini. It was described by Pierre Viette in 1957.
