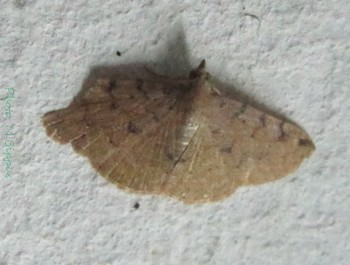

Scientific classification
- Domain: Eukaryota
- Kingdom: Animalia
- Phylum: Arthropoda
- Class: Insecta
- Order: Lepidoptera
- Superfamily: Noctuoidea
- Family: Erebidae
- Genus: Corgatha
- Species: C. terracotta

Binomial name
- Corgatha terracotta de Joannis, 1910

Synonyms
- Corgatha argillacea de Joannis, 1906

= Corgatha terracotta =

Species of moth

Corgatha terracotta is a species of moth of the family Erebidae. It is found in Réunion and Mauritius.

It has a wingspan of approximately 20 mm.

== See also ==
- List of moths of Réunion
- List of moths of Mauritius
