= Metachanda =

Scientific classification
- Kingdom: Animalia
- Phylum: Arthropoda
- Class: Insecta
- Order: Lepidoptera
- Family: Oecophoridae
- Subfamily: Oecophorinae
- Tribe: Metachandini
- Genus: Metachanda; Meyrick, 1911

Type species
- Metachanda thaleropis Meyrick, 1911

Sole genus of moth tribe Metachandini (Gelechioidea, Oecophoridae, Oecophorinae)

Metachanda is the sole genus in tribe Metachandini of moth subfamily Oecophorinae. Metachandini was originally described as family Metachandidae by Edward Meyrick in 1911, and at the time also contained the genus Chanystis, which is currently unplaced to tribe within Oecophorinae. It has also previously been described as tribe Metachandini of subfamily Gelechiinae.

Its type species is Metachanda thaleropis.

== Species ==
- Metachanda aldabrella
- Metachanda anomalella
- Metachanda argentinigrella
- Metachanda astrapias
- Metachanda autocentra
- Metachanda baryscias
- Metachanda benoistella
- Metachanda borbonicella
- Metachanda brachychlaena
- Metachanda brunneopunctella
- Metachanda cafrerella
- Metachanda citrodesma
- Metachanda classica
- Metachanda coetivyella
- Metachanda columnata
- Metachanda cophaea
- Metachanda crocozona
- Metachanda crypsitricha
- Metachanda declinata
- Metachanda drypsolitha
- Metachanda eophaea
- Metachanda eucyrtella
- Metachanda fimbriata
- Metachanda fortunata
- Metachanda fulgidella
- Metachanda fumata
- Metachanda gerberella
- Metachanda glaciata
- Metachanda gymnosopha
- Metachanda hamonella
- Metachanda heterobela
- Metachanda holombra
- Metachanda hugotella
- Metachanda hydraula
- Metachanda larochroa
- Metachanda louvelella
- Metachanda malevola
- Metachanda miltospila
- Metachanda mormodes
- Metachanda nigromaculella
- Metachanda noctivaga
- Metachanda oncera
- Metachanda oxyacma
- Metachanda oxyphrontis
- Metachanda phalarodora
- Metachanda plumbaginella
- Metachanda prodelta
- Metachanda ptilodoxa
- Metachanda reunionella
- Metachanda rungsella
- Metachanda rutenbergella
- Metachanda sublevata
- Metachanda taphrospila
- Metachanda thaleropis Meyrick, 1911
- Metachanda trimetropa
- Metachanda trisemanta
- Metachanda trixantha
