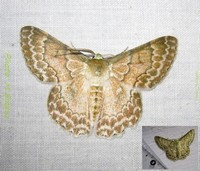

Scientific classification
- Kingdom: Animalia
- Phylum: Arthropoda
- Clade: Pancrustacea
- Class: Insecta
- Order: Lepidoptera
- Family: Geometridae
- Genus: Pingasa
- Species: P. hypoleucaria

Binomial name
- Pingasa hypoleucaria (Guenée, 1862)

Synonyms
- Hypochroma hypoleucaria Guenée, 1862; Hypochroma borbonisaria Oberthür, 1913

= Pingasa hypoleucaria =

Species of moth

Pingasa hypoleucaria is a species of moth of the family Geometridae first described by Achille Guenée in 1862. It is found on Réunion and Mauritius.

== Subspecies ==
- Pingasa hypoleucaria hypoleucaria (La Réunion)
- Pingasa hypoleucaria rhodozona de Joannis, 1932 (Mauritius)

== See also ==
- List of moths of Réunion
- List of moths of Mauritius
