= Metachanda citrodesma =

Scientific classification
- Kingdom: Animalia
- Phylum: Arthropoda
- Class: Insecta
- Order: Lepidoptera
- Family: Oecophoridae
- Genus: Metachanda
- Species: M. citrodesma

Binomial name
- Metachanda citrodesma Meyrick, 1912

Species of moth in genus Metachanda

Metachanda citrodesma is a moth species in the oecophorine tribe Metachandini. It was described by Edward Meyrick in 1912. Its type locality is in South Africa. The species also occurs on São Tomé, Príncipe and in Malawi.
