= Metachanda eucyrtella =

Scientific classification
- Kingdom: Animalia
- Phylum: Arthropoda
- Class: Insecta
- Order: Lepidoptera
- Family: Oecophoridae
- Genus: Metachanda
- Species: M. eucyrtella

Binomial name
- Metachanda eucyrtella Viette, 1957

Species of moth in genus Metachanda

Metachanda eucyrtella is a moth species in the oecophorine tribe Metachandini. It was described by Pierre Viette in 1957. Its type locality is on Réunion.
