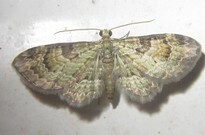
- Chloroclystis exilipicta

Scientific classification
- Kingdom: Animalia
- Phylum: Arthropoda
- Clade: Pancrustacea
- Class: Insecta
- Order: Lepidoptera
- Family: Geometridae
- Genus: Chloroclystis
- Species: C. exilipicta

Binomial name
- Chloroclystis exilipicta de Joannis, 1906

Synonyms
- Chloroclystis cryptoxantha de Joannis, 1932

= Chloroclystis exilipicta =

Species of moth

Chloroclystis exilipicta is a species of moth of the family Geometridae. It is found in Mauritius and La Réunion.

== See also ==
- List of moths of Mauritius
- List of moths of Réunion
