= Phodoryctis stephaniae =

Scientific classification
- Kingdom: Animalia
- Phylum: Arthropoda
- Class: Insecta
- Order: Lepidoptera
- Family: Gracillariidae
- Genus: Phodoryctis
- Species: P. stephaniae

Binomial name
- Phodoryctis stephaniae Kumata & Kuroko, 1988

Species of moth

Phodoryctis stephaniae is a moth of the family Gracillariidae. It is known from Japan (Honshū, Shikoku and the Ryukyu Islands), Nepal and Taiwan.

The wingspan is 5.8-8.1 mm.

The larvae feed on Stephania species, including Stephania japonica. They probably mine the leaves of their host plant.
