= Metachanda trimetropa =

Scientific classification
- Kingdom: Animalia
- Phylum: Arthropoda
- Class: Insecta
- Order: Lepidoptera
- Family: Oecophoridae
- Genus: Metachanda
- Species: M. trimetropa

Binomial name
- Metachanda trimetropa Meyrick, 1937

Species of moth in genus Metachanda

Metachanda trimetropa is a moth species in the oecophorine tribe Metachandini. It was described by Edward Meyrick in 1937.
