= Phodoryctis thrypticosema =

Scientific classification
- Kingdom: Animalia
- Phylum: Arthropoda
- Class: Insecta
- Order: Lepidoptera
- Family: Gracillariidae
- Genus: Phodoryctis
- Species: P. thrypticosema

Binomial name
- Phodoryctis thrypticosema (Vári, 1961)

Synonyms
- Acrocercops thrypticosema Vári, 1961; Sauterina thrypticosema

Species of moth

Phodoryctis thrypticosema is a moth of the family Gracillariidae. It is known from South Africa and Zimbabwe.

The larvae feed on Craibia brevicaudata. They mine the leaves of their host plant.
