= Metachanda phalarodora =

Scientific classification
- Kingdom: Animalia
- Phylum: Arthropoda
- Class: Insecta
- Order: Lepidoptera
- Family: Oecophoridae
- Genus: Metachanda
- Species: M. phalarodora

Binomial name
- Metachanda phalarodora Viette, 1955

Species of moth in genus Metachanda

Metachanda phalarodora is a moth species in the oecophorine tribe Metachandini. It was described by Pierre Viette in 1955. Its type locality is on Madagascar.
