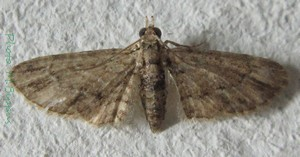
- Chloroclystis costicavata (fem.)

Scientific classification
- Domain: Eukaryota
- Kingdom: Animalia
- Phylum: Arthropoda
- Class: Insecta
- Order: Lepidoptera
- Family: Geometridae
- Genus: Chloroclystis
- Species: C. costicavata

Binomial name
- Chloroclystis costicavata de Joannis, 1932

= Chloroclystis costicavata =

Species of moth

Chloroclystis costicavata is a species of moth in the family Geometridae. It is found on Mauritius and Réunion.

The wingspan of this moth is approx. 12–15 millimetres (0.47–0.59 in). The edge of the forewings of the males have a convexed shape that makes it easy to distinguish them from the females.

Their larvae feed on the flowers of Lantana camara (Verbenaceae).

== See also ==
- List of moths of Mauritius
- List of moths of Réunion
