= Orphanostigma vibiusalis =

Scientific classification
- Kingdom: Animalia
- Phylum: Arthropoda
- Class: Insecta
- Order: Lepidoptera
- Family: Crambidae
- Genus: Orphanostigma
- Species: O. vibiusalis

Binomial name
- Orphanostigma vibiusalis (Walker, 1859)

Synonyms
- Botys vibiusalis Walker, 1859

Species of moth

Orphanostigma vibiusalis is a moth in the family Crambidae. It was described by Francis Walker in 1859. It is found in the Democratic Republic of the Congo (Katanga, Equateur, North Kivu), southern India, Malaysia and Myanmar.
