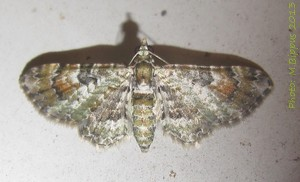

Scientific classification
- Domain: Eukaryota
- Kingdom: Animalia
- Phylum: Arthropoda
- Class: Insecta
- Order: Lepidoptera
- Family: Geometridae
- Genus: Gymnoscelis
- Species: G. rubricata

Binomial name
- Gymnoscelis rubricata (de Joannis, 1932)

Synonyms
- Chloroclystis rubricata de Joannis, 1932; Gymnoscelis rousseli Prout 1935; Gymnoscelis tripartita Prout, 1937

= Gymnoscelis rubricata =

Species of moth

Gymnoscelis rubricata is a moth of the family Geometridae. It was described by Joseph de Joannis in 1932. This moth is endemic to Mauritius and Réunion, where it is widespread at low and medium elevations. The wingspan is approximately 15–18 millimetres (0.59–0.71 in).

== See also ==
- List of moths of Réunion
- List of moths of Mauritius
