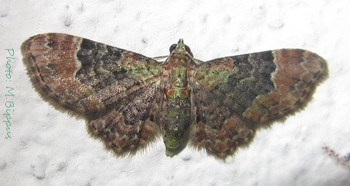

Scientific classification
- Domain: Eukaryota
- Kingdom: Animalia
- Phylum: Arthropoda
- Class: Insecta
- Order: Lepidoptera
- Family: Geometridae
- Genus: Chloroclystis
- Species: C. latifasciata

Binomial name
- Chloroclystis latifasciata de Joannis, 1932

= Chloroclystis latifasciata =

Species of moth

Chloroclystis latifasciata is a species of moth of the family Geometridae. It was described by Joseph de Joannis in 1932. It is found in Mauritius, Réunion, Madagascar.

Their wingspan is around 16 millimetres (0.63 in).

== See also ==
- List of moths of Mauritius
- List of moths of Réunion
- List of moths of Madagascar
