= Metachanda oxyacma =

Scientific classification
- Kingdom: Animalia
- Phylum: Arthropoda
- Class: Insecta
- Order: Lepidoptera
- Family: Oecophoridae
- Genus: Metachanda
- Species: M. oxyacma

Binomial name
- Metachanda oxyacma Meyrick, 1926

Species of moth in genus Metachanda

Metachanda oxyacma is a moth species in the oecophorine tribe Metachandini. It was described by Edward Meyrick in 1926. Its type locality is in South Africa.
