= Metachanda hamonella =

Scientific classification
- Kingdom: Animalia
- Phylum: Arthropoda
- Class: Insecta
- Order: Lepidoptera
- Family: Oecophoridae
- Genus: Metachanda
- Species: M. hamonella

Binomial name
- Metachanda hamonella Viette, 1954

Species of moth in genus Metachanda

Metachanda hamonella is a moth species in the oecophorine tribe Metachandini. It was described by Pierre Viette in 1954.
