= Metachanda coetivyella =

Scientific classification
- Kingdom: Animalia
- Phylum: Arthropoda
- Class: Insecta
- Order: Lepidoptera
- Family: Oecophoridae
- Genus: Metachanda
- Species: M. coetivyella

Binomial name
- Metachanda coetivyella Legrand, 1965

Species of moth in genus Metachanda

Metachanda coetivyella is a moth species in the oecophorine tribe Metachandini. It was described by Henry Legrand in 1965. Its type locality is Coëtivy Island, a small coral island of Seychelles.
