= Metachanda fulgidella =

Scientific classification
- Kingdom: Animalia
- Phylum: Arthropoda
- Class: Insecta
- Order: Lepidoptera
- Family: Oecophoridae
- Genus: Metachanda
- Species: M. fulgidella

Binomial name
- Metachanda fulgidella Legrand, 1965

Species of moth in genus Metachanda

Metachanda fulgidella is a moth species in the oecophorine tribe, Metachandini. It was described by Henry Legrand in 1965.
