= Orphanostigma excisa =

Scientific classification
- Kingdom: Animalia
- Phylum: Arthropoda
- Class: Insecta
- Order: Lepidoptera
- Family: Crambidae
- Genus: Orphanostigma
- Species: O. excisa

Binomial name
- Orphanostigma excisa (E. L. Martin, 1956)

Synonyms
- Syngamia excisa E. L. Martin, 1956

Species of moth

Orphanostigma excisa is a moth in the family Crambidae. It was described by Edward L. Martin in 1956. It is found in Burundi, Cameroon, Malawi and Mozambique.
