= Metachanda heterobela =

Scientific classification
- Kingdom: Animalia
- Phylum: Arthropoda
- Class: Insecta
- Order: Lepidoptera
- Family: Oecophoridae
- Genus: Metachanda
- Species: M. heterobela

Binomial name
- Metachanda heterobela Janse, 1954

Species of moth in genus Metachanda

Metachanda heterobela is a moth species in the oecophorine tribe Metachandini. It was described by Anthonie Johannes Theodorus Janse in 1954.
