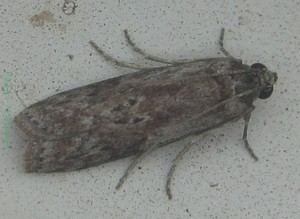

Scientific classification
- Domain: Eukaryota
- Kingdom: Animalia
- Phylum: Arthropoda
- Class: Insecta
- Order: Lepidoptera
- Family: Pyralidae
- Genus: Pempelia
- Species: P. strophocomma

Binomial name
- Pempelia strophocomma (de Joannis, 1932)

Synonyms
- Salebria strophocomma de Joannis, 1932

= Pempelia strophocomma =

Species of moth

Pempelia strophocomma is a moth of the family Pyralidae. It was described by Joseph de Joannis in 1932 and is endemic in the Mascarene islands Réunion and Mauritius. Its length is about 10 mm and its wingspan is about 20 mm.

The larvae feed on Annonaceae (Annona squamosa).

== See also ==
- List of moths of Réunion
- List of moths of Mauritius
