= Metachanda brunneopunctella =

Scientific classification
- Kingdom: Animalia
- Phylum: Arthropoda
- Class: Insecta
- Order: Lepidoptera
- Family: Oecophoridae
- Genus: Metachanda
- Species: M. brunneopunctella

Binomial name
- Metachanda brunneopunctella Legrand, 1965

Species of moth in genus Metachanda

Metachanda brunneopunctella is a moth species in the oecophorine tribe Metachandini. It was described by Henry Legrand in 1965. It is found in Seychelles on Mahé Island and Curieuse Island, the former of which is its type locality.
