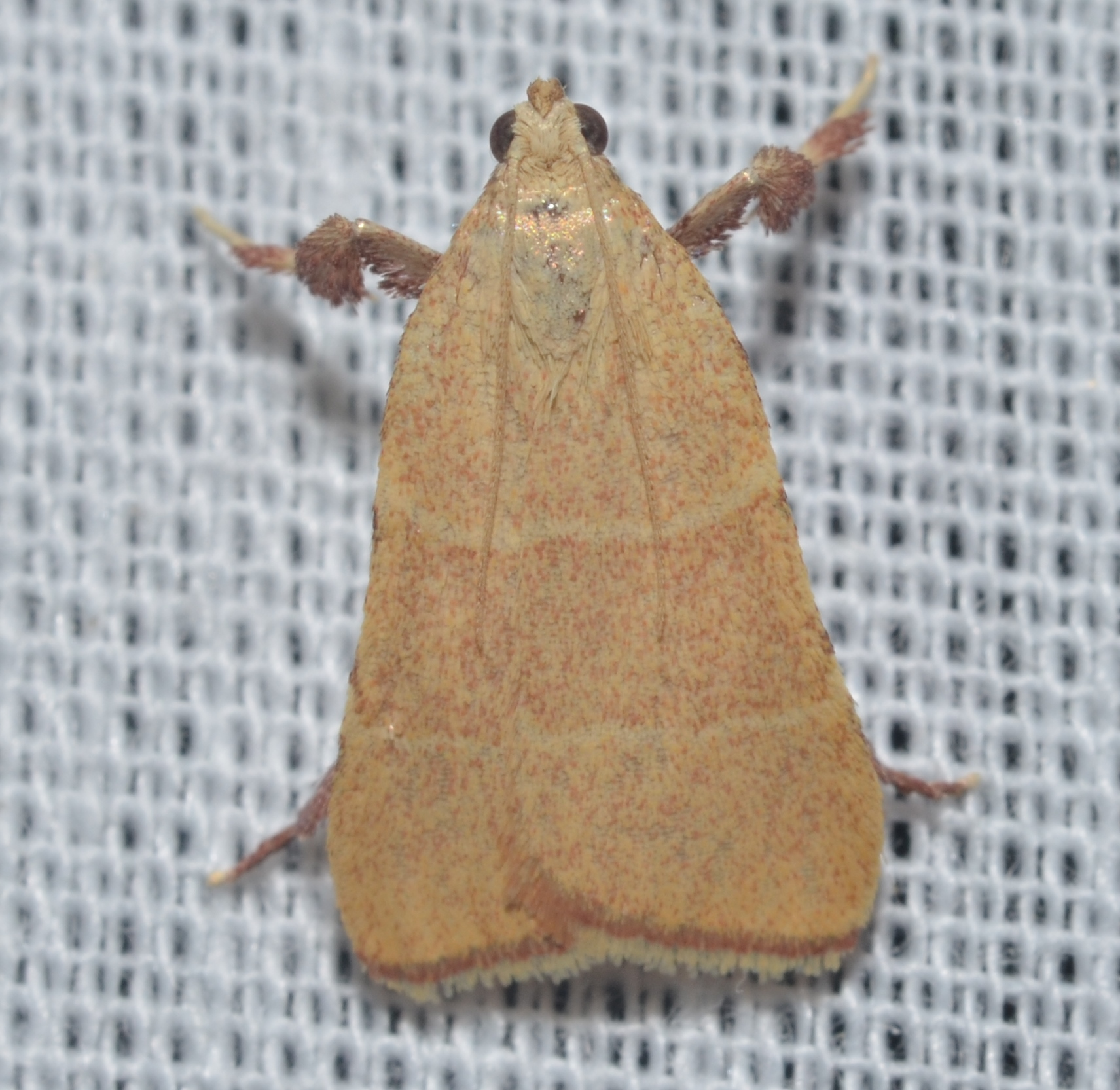

Scientific classification
- Kingdom: Animalia
- Phylum: Arthropoda
- Class: Insecta
- Order: Lepidoptera
- Family: Pyralidae
- Genus: Parachma
- Species: P. ochracealis

Binomial name
- Parachma ochracealis Walker, 1866

= Parachma ochracealis =

Species of moth

Parachma ochracealis is a species of pyralid moth in the family Pyralidae.

The MONA or Hodges number for Parachma ochracealis is 5538.
