= Metachanda rutenbergella =

Scientific classification
- Kingdom: Animalia
- Phylum: Arthropoda
- Class: Insecta
- Order: Lepidoptera
- Family: Oecophoridae
- Genus: Metachanda
- Species: M. rutenbergella

Binomial name
- Metachanda rutenbergella Viette, 1956

Species of moth in genus Metachanda

Metachanda rutenbergella is a moth species in the oecophorine tribe Metachandini. It was described by Pierre Viette in 1956.
