= Metachanda aldabrella =

Scientific classification
- Kingdom: Animalia
- Phylum: Arthropoda
- Class: Insecta
- Order: Lepidoptera
- Family: Oecophoridae
- Genus: Metachanda
- Species: M. aldabrella

Binomial name
- Metachanda aldabrella Legrand, 1965

Moth species of genus Metachanda

Metachanda aldabrella is a moth in the oecophorine tribe Metachandini. It was described by Henry Legrand in 1965. Its type locality is Aldabra in the Seychelles.
