= Orphanostigma fulvistriga =

Scientific classification
- Kingdom: Animalia
- Phylum: Arthropoda
- Class: Insecta
- Order: Lepidoptera
- Family: Crambidae
- Genus: Orphanostigma
- Species: O. fulvistriga

Binomial name
- Orphanostigma fulvistriga C. Swinhoe, 1894

Species of moth

Orphanostigma fulvistriga is a moth in the family Crambidae. It was described by Charles Swinhoe in 1894. It is found in Meghalaya, India.
