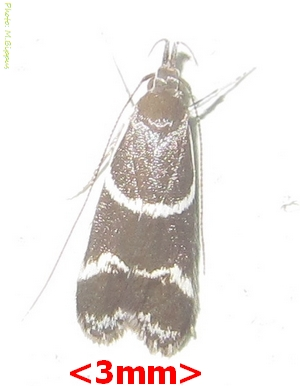
- Taragmarcha laqueata

Scientific classification
- Kingdom: Animalia
- Phylum: Arthropoda
- Class: Insecta
- Order: Lepidoptera
- Family: Oecophoridae
- Genus: Taragmarcha
- Species: T. laqueata

Binomial name
- Taragmarcha laqueata Meyrick, 1910

= Taragmarcha laqueata =

Species of moth

Taragmarcha laqueata is a moth of the family Oecophoridae. It is endemic on the island of Mauritius.

It has a wingspan of 17mm, head and thorax are dark glossy fuscous, palpi white. Antennae whitish, ringed with dark fuscous. The abdomen is grey. Forewings are elongated, rather dark glossy fuscous, with a white streak along basal third of costa. Hindwings are dark grey

Another species, Taragmarcha borbonensis, from the neighboring island of La Réunion had originally been designated as a subspecies of T. laqueata.
