= Metachanda fumata =

Scientific classification
- Kingdom: Animalia
- Phylum: Arthropoda
- Class: Insecta
- Order: Lepidoptera
- Family: Oecophoridae
- Genus: Metachanda
- Species: M. fumata

Binomial name
- Metachanda fumata Meyrick, 1911

Species of moth in the genus Metachanda

Metachanda fumata is a moth species in the oecophorine tribe Metachandini. It was described by Edward Meyrick in 1911. Its type locality is Mahé Island in the Seychelles.
