= Metachanda cafrerella =

Scientific classification
- Kingdom: Animalia
- Phylum: Arthropoda
- Class: Insecta
- Order: Lepidoptera
- Family: Oecophoridae
- Genus: Metachanda
- Species: M. cafrerella

Binomial name
- Metachanda cafrerella Viette, 1957

Species of moth in genus Metachanda

Metachanda cafrerella is a moth species in the oecophorine tribe Metachandini. It was described by Pierre Viette in 1957. Its type locality is on Réunion.
