= Thiognatha metachalca =

Scientific classification
- Domain: Eukaryota
- Kingdom: Animalia
- Phylum: Arthropoda
- Class: Insecta
- Order: Lepidoptera
- Family: Gelechiidae
- Genus: Thiognatha
- Species: T. metachalca

Binomial name
- Thiognatha metachalca Meyrick, 1920

Species of moth

Thiognatha metachalca is a moth in the family Gelechiidae. It was described by Edward Meyrick in 1920. It is found in Kenya.
