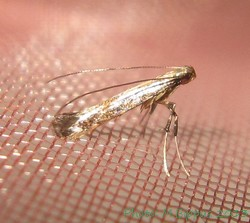
- Phodoryctis caerulea

Scientific classification
- Kingdom: Animalia
- Phylum: Arthropoda
- Class: Insecta
- Order: Lepidoptera
- Family: Gracillariidae
- Subfamily: Acrocercopinae
- Genus: Phodoryctis; Kumata & Kuroko, 1988

Species
- See text

= Phodoryctis =

Genus of moths

Phodoryctis is a genus of moths in the family Gracillariidae.

== Species ==
- Phodoryctis caerulea (Meyrick, 1912)
- Phodoryctis dolichophila (Vári, 1961)
- Phodoryctis stephaniae Kumata & Kuroko, 1988
- Phodoryctis thrypticosema (Vári, 1961)
