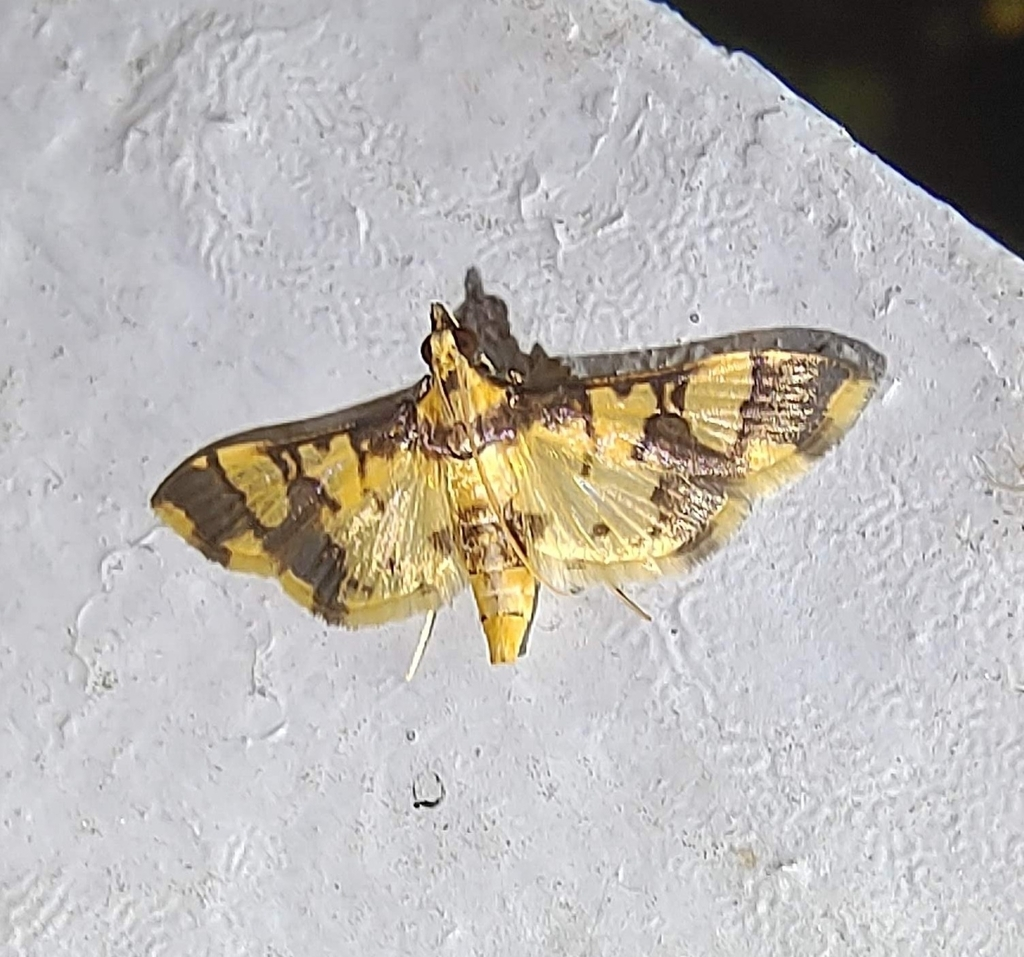

Scientific classification
- Kingdom: Animalia
- Phylum: Arthropoda
- Class: Insecta
- Order: Lepidoptera
- Family: Crambidae
- Genus: Orphanostigma
- Species: O. angustale

Binomial name
- Orphanostigma angustale Hampson, 1893

Synonyms
- Syngamia xanthalis Hampson, 1899

= Orphanostigma angustale =

Species of moth

Orphanostigma angustale is a moth in the family Crambidae. It was described by George Hampson in 1893. It is found on New Guinea and in Australia, where it has been recorded from Queensland.

== Description ==
This species was described by Arthur Gardiner Butler as follows:

Expanse 2/3 inch. Male. Forewing rather narrower than in the other species of the genus. Head, thorax, and abdomen yellow, with some purplish grey suffusion, chiefly on collar and metathorax. Palpi blackish, white below. Forewing purplish grey, a large yellow kidney-shaped spot in and below the cell; a still larger one beyond the cell; some yellow markings on inner margin and at outer angle; cilia yellow, fuscous at apex and middle. Hindwing yellow; a fuscous line on the discocellulars, another across apex; a fuscous blotch at apex; a spot below first median nervule and another at anal angle.
