= Metachanda malevola =

Scientific classification
- Kingdom: Animalia
- Phylum: Arthropoda
- Class: Insecta
- Order: Lepidoptera
- Family: Oecophoridae
- Genus: Metachanda
- Species: M. malevola

Binomial name
- Metachanda malevola Meyrick, 1924

Species of moth in genus Metachanda

Metachanda malevola is a moth species in the oecophorine tribe Metachandini. It was described by Edward Meyrick in 1924.
