= Cosmopterix dacryodes =

Scientific classification
- Kingdom: Animalia
- Phylum: Arthropoda
- Class: Insecta
- Order: Lepidoptera
- Family: Cosmopterigidae
- Genus: Cosmopterix
- Species: C. dacryodes

Binomial name
- Cosmopterix dacryodes Meyrick, 1910

Species of moth

Cosmopterix dacryodes is a moth of the family Cosmopterigidae. It is widely found in Mauritius and Rodrigues in the Indian Ocean.

The wingspan is about 7 mm.
