= Pyrausta childrenalis =

Scientific classification
- Domain: Eukaryota
- Kingdom: Animalia
- Phylum: Arthropoda
- Class: Insecta
- Order: Lepidoptera
- Family: Crambidae
- Genus: Pyrausta
- Species: P. childrenalis

Binomial name
- Pyrausta childrenalis (Boisduval, 1833)

Synonyms
- Botys childrenalis Boisduval, 1833

Species of moth

Pyrausta childrenalis is a moth in the family Crambidae. It was described by Jean Baptiste Boisduval in 1833. It is found on Réunion and Madagascar.
