= Scoparia benigna =

Scientific classification
- Kingdom: Animalia
- Phylum: Arthropoda
- Class: Insecta
- Order: Lepidoptera
- Family: Crambidae
- Genus: Scoparia
- Species: S. benigna

Binomial name
- Scoparia benigna Meyrick, 1910

Synonyms
- Scoparia dulcis de Joannis, 1932

Species of moth

Scoparia benigna is a moth in the family Crambidae. It was described by Edward Meyrick in 1910. It is found on Réunion, Madagascar and Mauritius.
