= Thiognatha mameti =

Scientific classification
- Domain: Eukaryota
- Kingdom: Animalia
- Phylum: Arthropoda
- Class: Insecta
- Order: Lepidoptera
- Family: Gelechiidae
- Genus: Thiognatha
- Species: T. mameti

Binomial name
- Thiognatha mameti Viette, 1953

Species of moth

Thiognatha mameti is a moth in the family Gelechiidae. It was described by Pierre Viette in 1953. It is found on Mauritius.
