= Metachanda fimbriata =

Scientific classification
- Kingdom: Animalia
- Phylum: Arthropoda
- Class: Insecta
- Order: Lepidoptera
- Family: Oecophoridae
- Genus: Metachanda
- Species: M. fimbriata

Binomial name
- Metachanda fimbriata Meyrick, 1910

Species of moth in genus Metachanda

Metachanda fimbriata is a moth species in the oecophorine tribe Metachandini. It was described by Edward Meyrick in 1910. Its type locality is in Mauritius.
