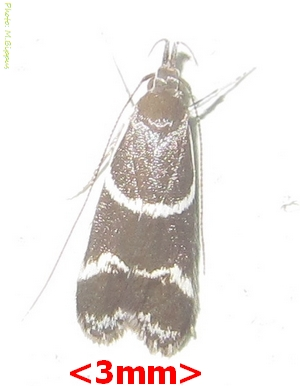
- Taragmarcha borbonensis

Scientific classification
- Kingdom: Animalia
- Phylum: Arthropoda
- Class: Insecta
- Order: Lepidoptera
- Family: Oecophoridae
- Genus: Taragmarcha
- Species: T. borbonensis

Binomial name
- Taragmarcha borbonensis Viette, 1957

Synonyms
- Taragmarcha laqueata borbonensis Viette, 1957

= Taragmarcha borbonensis =

Species of moth

Taragmarcha borbonensis is a moth of the family Oecophoridae. It is endemic on the island of Réunion. The length is approx 7–10 mm and the wingspan is about 15–20 mm.
