= Metachanda declinata =

Scientific classification
- Kingdom: Animalia
- Phylum: Arthropoda
- Clade: Pancrustacea
- Class: Insecta
- Order: Lepidoptera
- Family: Oecophoridae
- Genus: Metachanda
- Species: M. declinata

Binomial name
- Metachanda declinata Meyrick, 1924

Species of moth in genus Metachanda

Metachanda declinata is a moth species in the oecophorine tribe Metachandini. It was described by Edward Meyrick in 1924. Its type locality is on Mauritius.
