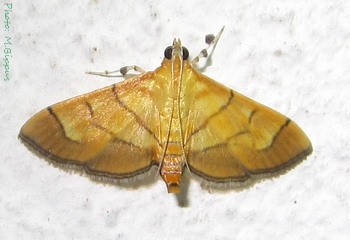
- Wingspan 17 mm
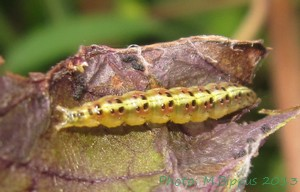
- Caterpillar on basil

Scientific classification
- Kingdom: Animalia
- Phylum: Arthropoda
- Class: Insecta
- Order: Lepidoptera
- Family: Crambidae
- Genus: Orphanostigma
- Species: O. abruptalis

Binomial name
- Orphanostigma abruptalis (Walker, 1859)

Synonyms
- Asopia abruptalis Walker, 1859; Syngamia aeruginosa Ghesquière, 1942; Asopia dotatalis Walker, 1866; Asopia suffectalis Walker, 1866

= Orphanostigma abruptalis =

Species of moth

Orphanostigma abruptalis is a moth of the family Crambidae. The species was first described by Francis Walker in 1859. It occurs in the tropics of the Old World from Africa to Australia.

The adult's wingspan is approximately 15 to 20 mm.

Known food plants of this moth are several Lamiaceae, including species from the genera Ocimum, Mentha, Perilla, Hyptis and a Theaceae.
