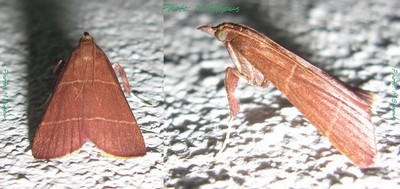

Scientific classification
- Domain: Eukaryota
- Kingdom: Animalia
- Phylum: Arthropoda
- Class: Insecta
- Order: Lepidoptera
- Family: Pyralidae
- Genus: Parachma
- Species: P. lequettealis

Binomial name
- Parachma lequettealis Guillermot, 2011

= Parachma lequettealis =

Species of moth

Parachma lequettealis is a moth of subfamily Chrysauginae in the genus Parachma. It was described by Christian Guillermet in 2011, and is found in Gabon, Mauritius, Nigeria, Réunion, French Guiana and Peru.
