= Metachanda astrapias =

Scientific classification
- Kingdom: Animalia
- Phylum: Arthropoda
- Clade: Pancrustacea
- Class: Insecta
- Order: Lepidoptera
- Family: Oecophoridae
- Genus: Metachanda
- Species: M. astrapias

Binomial name
- Metachanda astrapias (Meyrick, 1887)

Synonyms
- Ancylometis astrapias Meyrick

Species of moth in genus Metachanda

Metachanda astrapias is a moth species in the oecophorine tribe Metachandini. It was described by Edward Meyrick in 1887. It is known from Mauritius, which is its type locality.

This species has a wingspan of 12mm for the male. Its head and palpi are whitish-ochreous, antennae dark fuscous. Thorax is whitish-ochreous, abdomen light grey, anal tuft whitish-ochreous. The forewings are elongated, narrow with a gently arched costa. They are fuscous with a pale greyish-ochreous median longitudinal streak from the base, margined beneath by a blackish streak and above by a cloudy blackish dot. The hindwings are grey, more thinly scaled towards the base.
