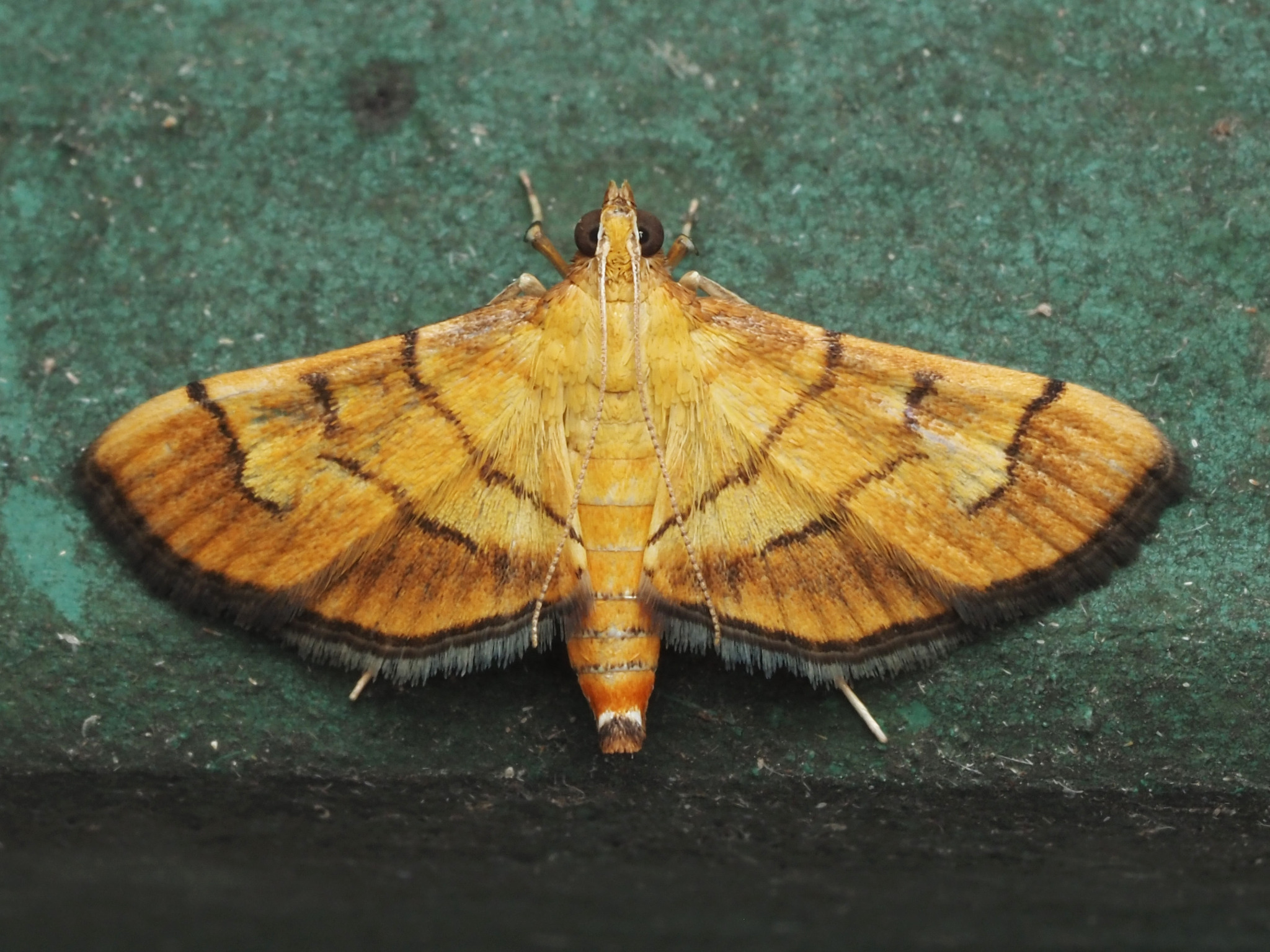
- Adult moth
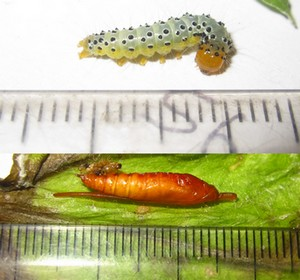
- Caterpillar and pupae

Scientific classification
- Kingdom: Animalia
- Phylum: Arthropoda
- Class: Insecta
- Order: Lepidoptera
- Family: Crambidae
- Genus: Orphanostigma
- Species: O. haemorrhoidalis

Binomial name
- Orphanostigma haemorrhoidalis (Guenée, 1854)

Synonyms
- Anania haemorrhoidalis; Salbia haemorrhoidalis Hodges et al., 1983; Syngamia haemorrhodialis Klima, 1939; Asopia dircealis Walker, 1859; Hedylepta futilalis Barnes & McDunnough, 1914

= Orphanostigma haemorrhoidalis =

Species of moth

Orphanostigma haemorrhoidalis, the lantana leaftier, is a moth of the family Crambidae. It is native to South America, Central America, Mexico, the Antilles and the southern United States, but has been introduced in Hawaii in 1956, Queensland in 1958 and Réunion, Mauritius to control Lantana. The species was first described by Achille Guenée in 1854.

The larvae feed on the leaves of Lantana species.
