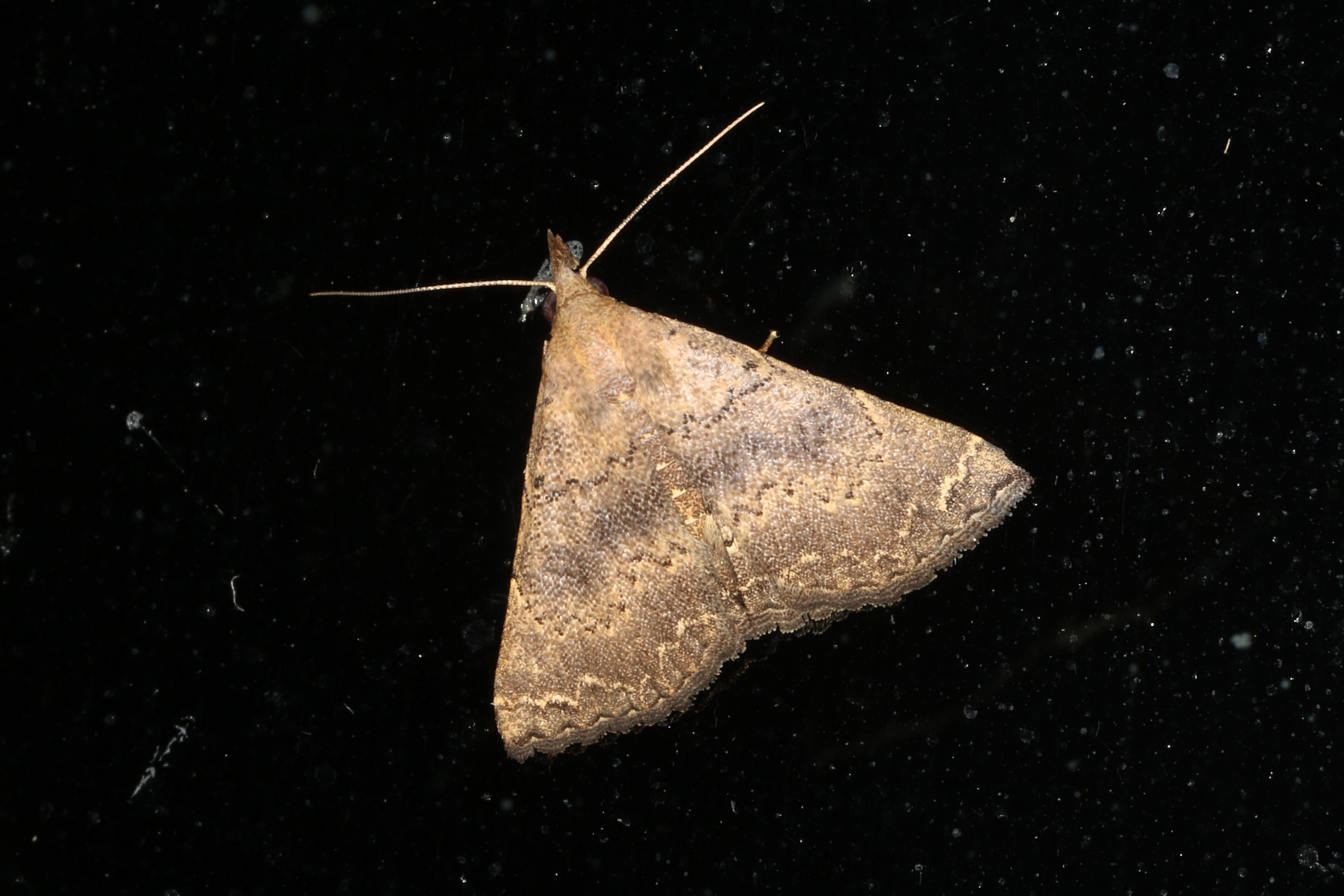

Scientific classification
- Kingdom: Animalia
- Phylum: Arthropoda
- Class: Insecta
- Order: Lepidoptera
- Superfamily: Noctuoidea
- Family: Noctuidae
- Genus: Progonia oileusalis (Walker, [1859])

Synonyms
- List: Herminia oileusalis Walker, [1859] 1858; Progonia oileusalis Swinhoe, 1900; Bleptina patronalis Walker, 1859; Progonia reniferalis Hampson, 1896; Nodaria epiplmoides Strand, 1920; Nagadeba brunnealis Wileman & South, 1916

= Progonia oileusalis =

Species of moth

Progonia oileusalis is a species of moth in the family Noctuidae first described by Francis Walker in 1859. It is found in Sri Lanka, Borneo, India, Taiwan, Japan and the Philippines.

== Gallery ==
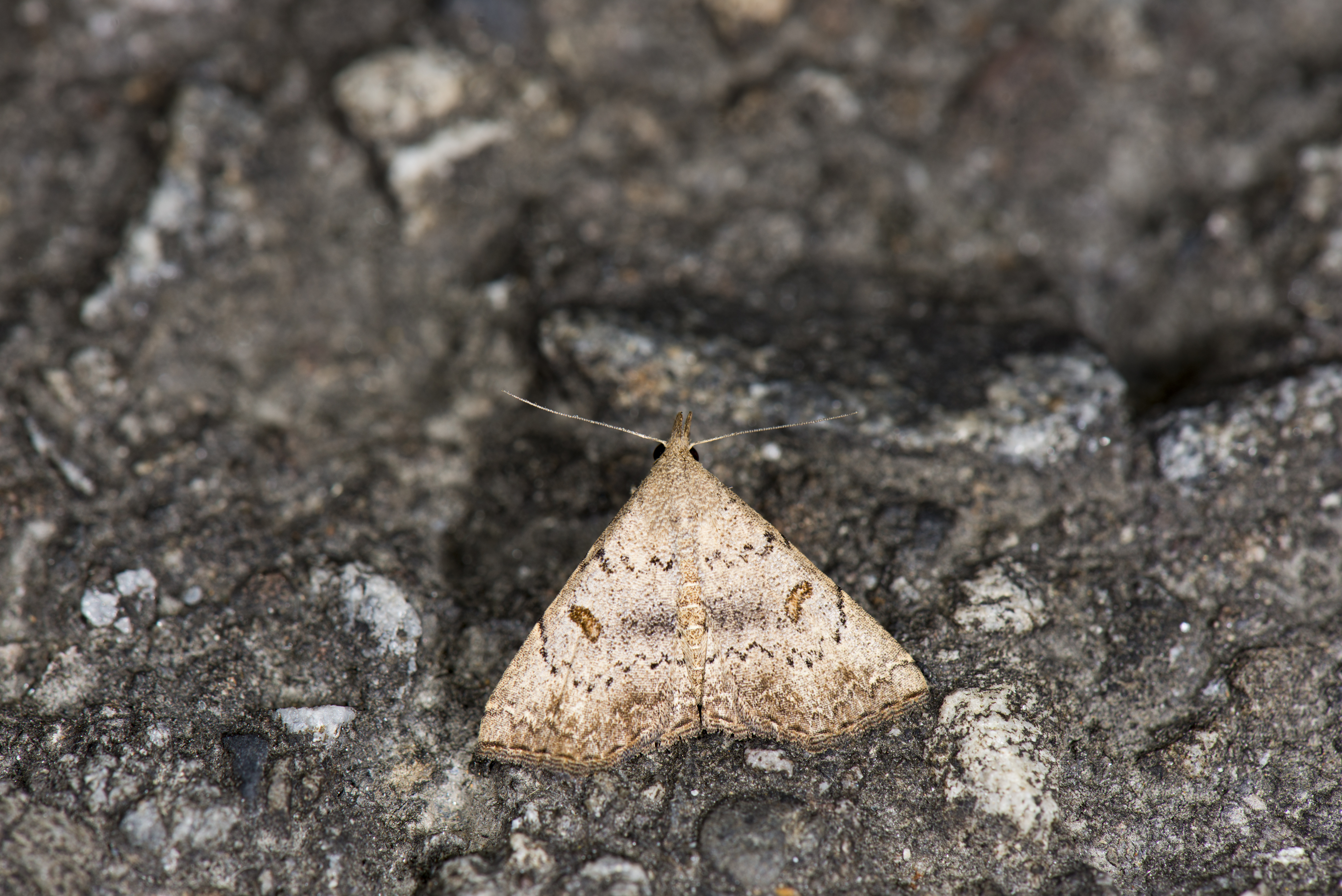

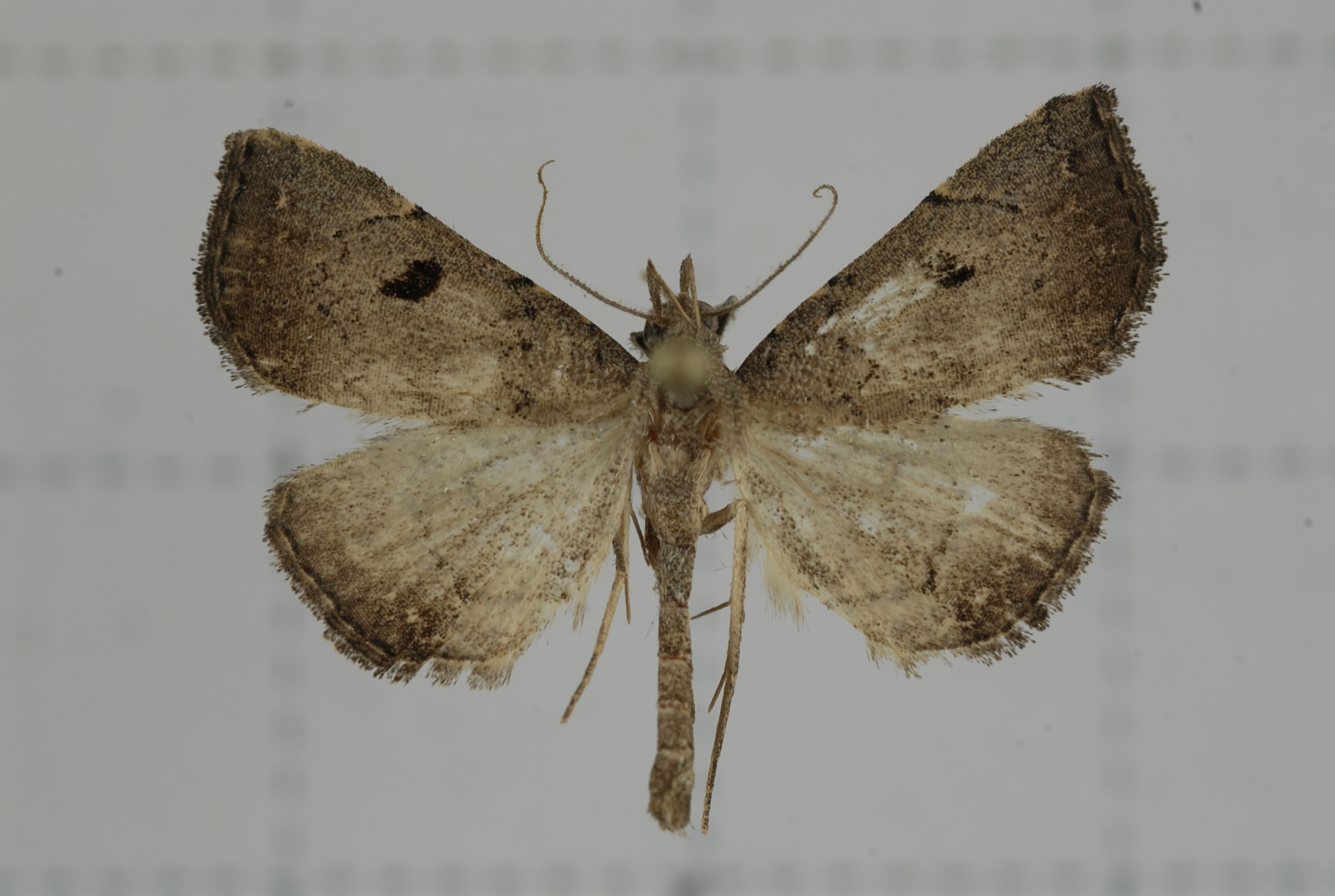

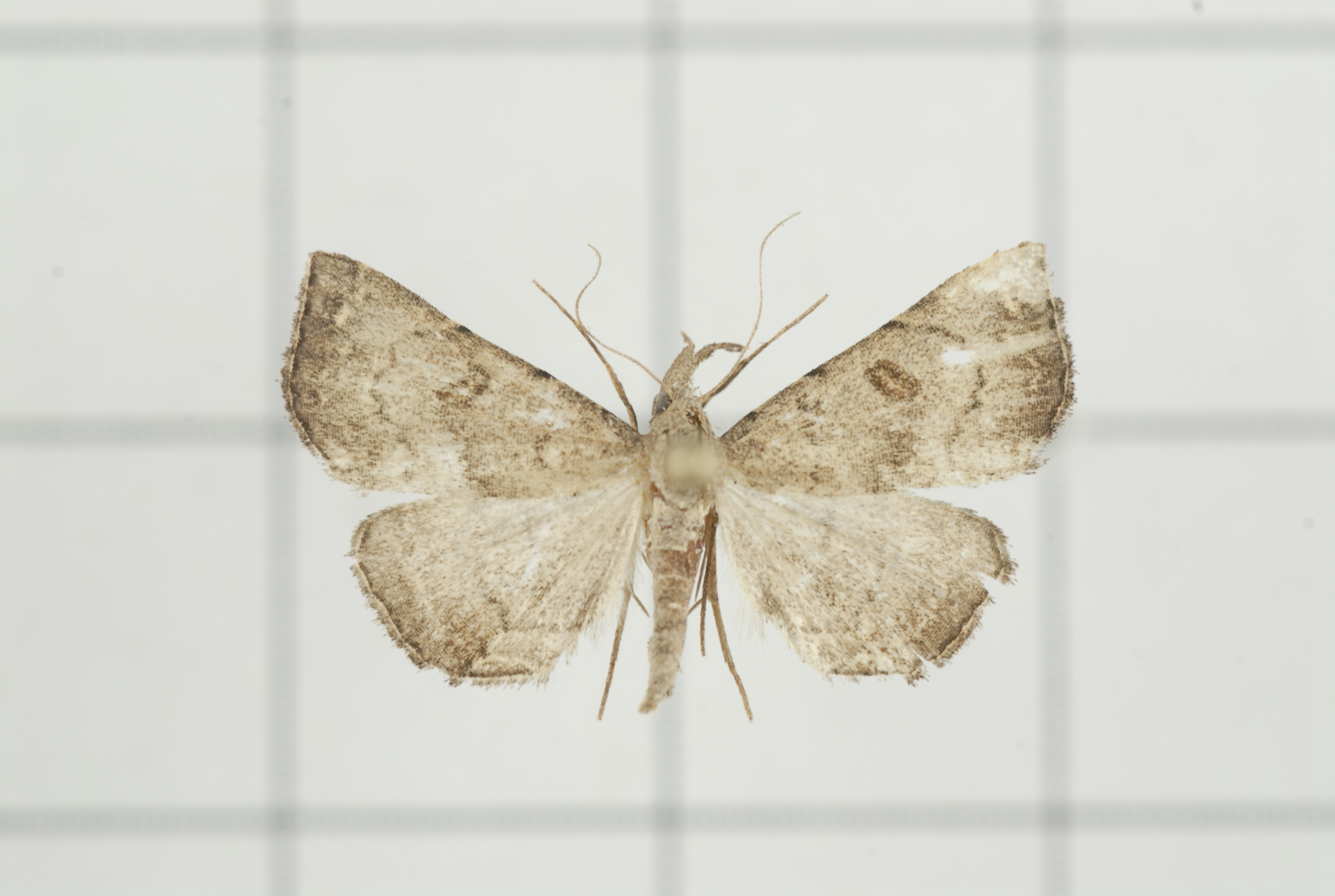

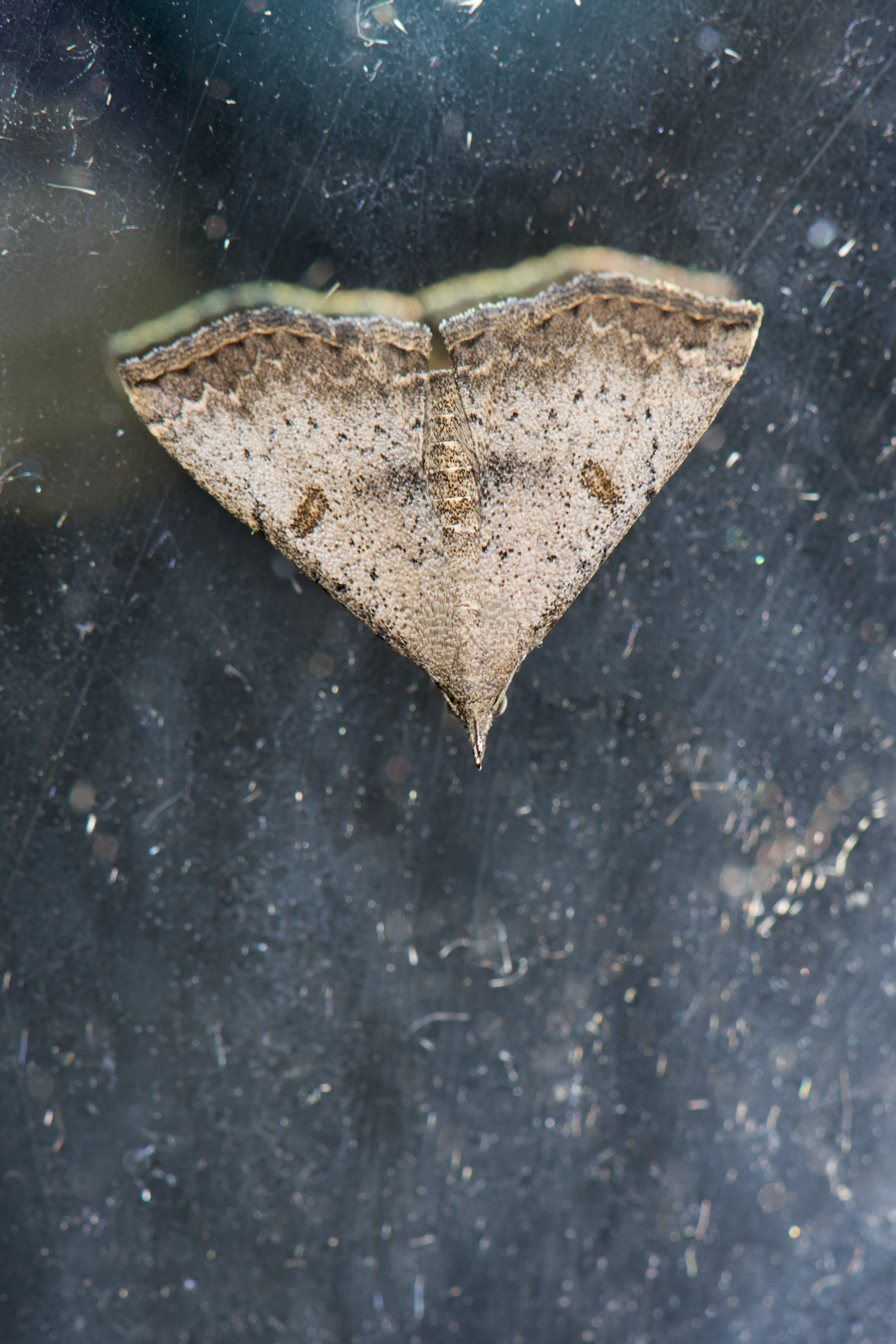

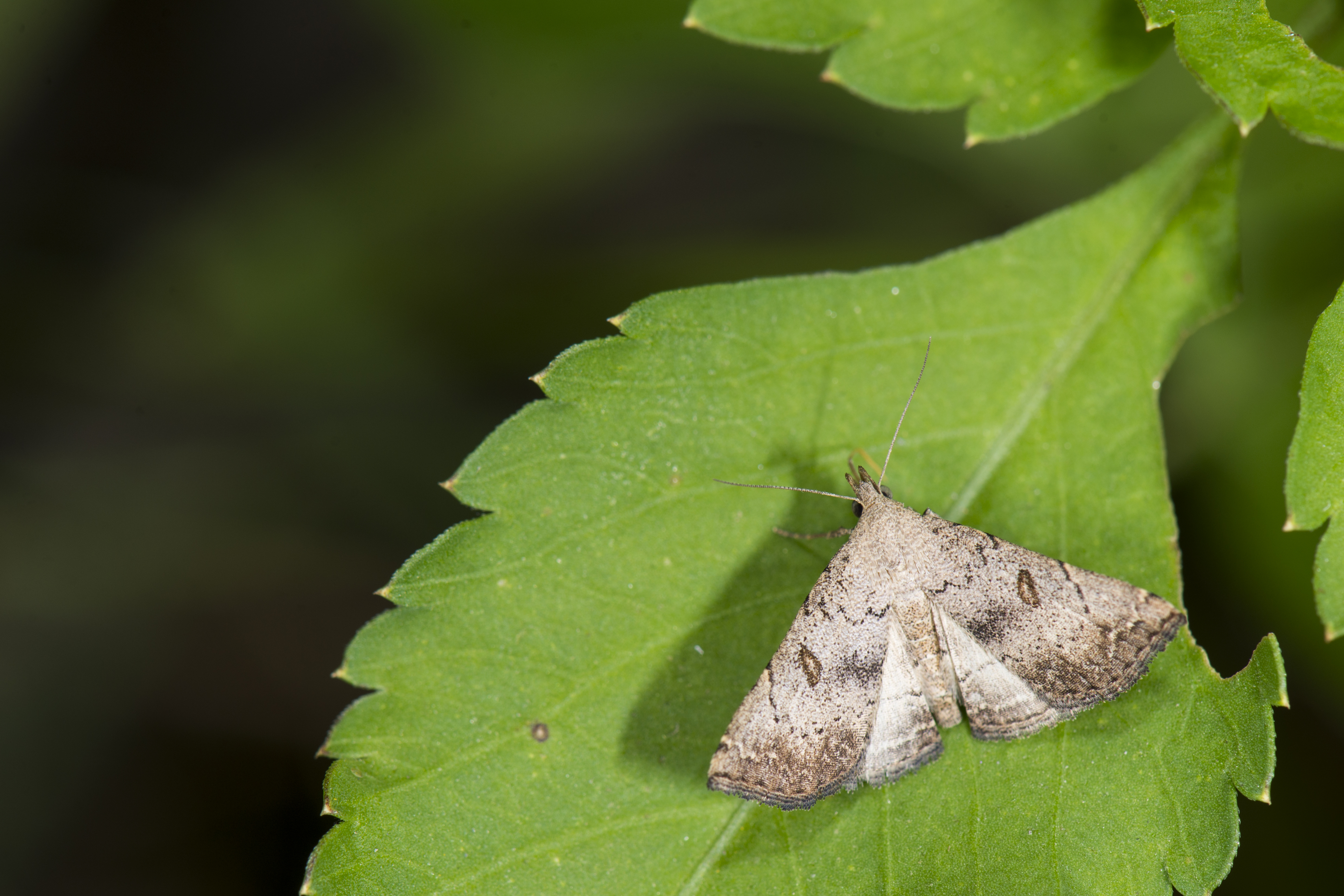
