= Metachanda oxyphrontis =

Scientific classification
- Kingdom: Animalia
- Phylum: Arthropoda
- Class: Insecta
- Order: Lepidoptera
- Family: Oecophoridae
- Genus: Metachanda
- Species: M. oxyphrontis

Binomial name
- Metachanda oxyphrontis Meyrick, 1930

Species of moth in genus Metachanda

Metachanda oxyphrontis is a moth species in the oecophorine tribe Metachandini. It was described by Edward Meyrick in 1930.
