= Ogmocoma =

Scientific classification
- Kingdom: Animalia
- Phylum: Arthropoda
- Clade: Pancrustacea
- Class: Insecta
- Order: Lepidoptera
- Family: Tineidae
- Genus: Ogmocoma; Meyrick, 1924
- Species: O. pharmacista

Binomial name
- Ogmocoma pharmacista Meyrick, 1924

Genus of moths

Ogmocoma is a moth genus, belonging to the family Tineidae. It contains only one species, Ogmocoma pharmacista, which is found on Rodrigues Island in Mauritius.
