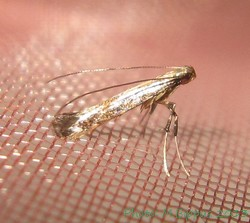

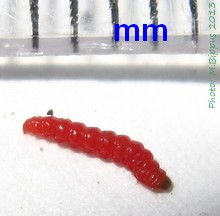

Scientific classification
- Kingdom: Animalia
- Phylum: Arthropoda
- Class: Insecta
- Order: Lepidoptera
- Family: Gracillariidae
- Genus: Phodoryctis
- Species: P. caerulea

Binomial name
- Phodoryctis caerulea (Meyrick, 1912)

Synonyms
- Cyphosticha caerulea Meyrick, 1912; Cyphosticha centrometra Meyrick, 1920; Phodoryctis caerula Bradley, 1961

= Phodoryctis caerulea =

Species of moth

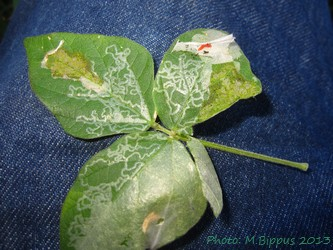
Phodoryctis caerulea mines & larvae on Macroptilium atropurpureum

Phodoryctis caerulea is a moth of the family Gracillariidae. It is known from India (Maharashtra, Tamil Nadu, Bihar), Malaysia (Sabah), Indonesia (Java), Sri Lanka, Fiji, Guam, the Solomon Islands, Japan (Kyūshū, the Ryukyu Islands) and Taiwan, as well as Madagascar, Mauritius, Réunion, Uganda and Tanzania.

The wingspan is 6–8 mm.

The larvae feed on Carissa carandas, Caesalpinia pulcherrima, Diospora deltoidea, Cajanus cajan, Calopogonium mucunoides, Canavalia species (including Canavalia ensiformis), Centrosema pubescens, Crotalaria juncea, Dolichos lablab, Dumauis bicolor, Glycine max, Lablab purpureus, Macroptilium atropurpureum , Macroptilum lathyroides, Phaseolus mungo, Phaseolus semierectus, Phaseolus vulgaris, Pueraria phaseoloides, Vicia faba, Vigna catjang, Vigna marina, Vigna marina, Vigna mungo, Vigna radiata, Vigna umbellata, Vigna unguiculata, Cissampelos pereira, Cyclea species, Stephania hermandifolia, Stephania japonica, Tinospora cardifolia and Coffea species. They mine the leaves of their host plant.
