= Mythimna infrargyrea =

Scientific classification
- Kingdom: Animalia
- Phylum: Arthropoda
- Clade: Pancrustacea
- Class: Insecta
- Order: Lepidoptera
- Superfamily: Noctuoidea
- Family: Noctuidae
- Genus: Mythimna
- Species: M. infrargyrea

Binomial name
- Mythimna infrargyrea Saalmüller, 1891

Synonyms
- Leucania infrargyrea Saalmüller, 1891; Leucaloa infrargyrea; Aletia infrargyrea (Saalmüller, 1891); Borolia lithargyroides Kenrick, 1917

Species of moth

Mythimna infrargyrea is a species of moth in the family Noctuidae that was first described by Max Saalmüller in 1891. It is known from Madagascar.

This species has a wingspan of 26–28 mm.
