= Metachanda thaleropis =

Scientific classification
- Kingdom: Animalia
- Phylum: Arthropoda
- Class: Insecta
- Order: Lepidoptera
- Family: Oecophoridae
- Genus: Metachanda
- Species: M. thaleropis

Binomial name
- Metachanda thaleropis Meyrick, 1911

Type species of moth genus Metachanda

Metachanda thaleropis is a type species of Metachanda, a moth genus in the oecophorine tribe Metachandini. It was described by Edward Meyrick in 1911. Its type locality is Mahé Island, Seychelles.
