= Phodoryctis dolichophila =

Scientific classification
- Kingdom: Animalia
- Phylum: Arthropoda
- Class: Insecta
- Order: Lepidoptera
- Family: Gracillariidae
- Genus: Phodoryctis
- Species: P. dolichophila

Binomial name
- Phodoryctis dolichophila (Vári, 1961)

Synonyms
- Acrocercops dolichophila Vári, 1961

Species of moth

Phodoryctis dolichophila is a moth of the family Gracillariidae. It is known from South Africa and Zimbabwe.

The larvae feed on Dolichos trilobus and Vigna species, including Vigna unguiculata.
