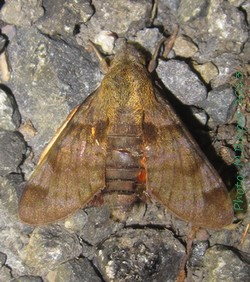

Scientific classification
- Kingdom: Animalia
- Phylum: Arthropoda
- Class: Insecta
- Order: Lepidoptera
- Family: Sphingidae
- Genus: Macroglossum
- Species: M. milvus

Binomial name
- Macroglossum milvus (Boisduval, 1833)

Synonyms
- Macroglossa milvus Boisduval, 1833; Macroglossa milvus Walker, 1856

= Macroglossum milvus =

Species of moth

Macroglossum milvus is a moth of the family Sphingidae. It is known from Réunion (formerly known as Île Bourbon) and Mauritius.

The head and thorax uppersides have a dark mesial line. The abdomen upperside has four orange lateral patches, of which the first is the smallest. The thorax underside is clayish reddish cinnamon. The palpus is more grey, with a purer white side-stripe. The abdomen underside is tawny. Both wings undersides are bright tawny, with the inconspicuous distal borders a duller brown and the extreme bases more or less yellow, especially near the inner edge of the hindwing. The hindwing upperside is bright tawny, without a dark border and the extreme base is brownish black. The yellow antemedian band is ill-defined.

The larvae feed on Mussaenda arcuata, Diana fragans and Chassalia corallioides.
