= Silhouette Island =

Island of the Seychelles

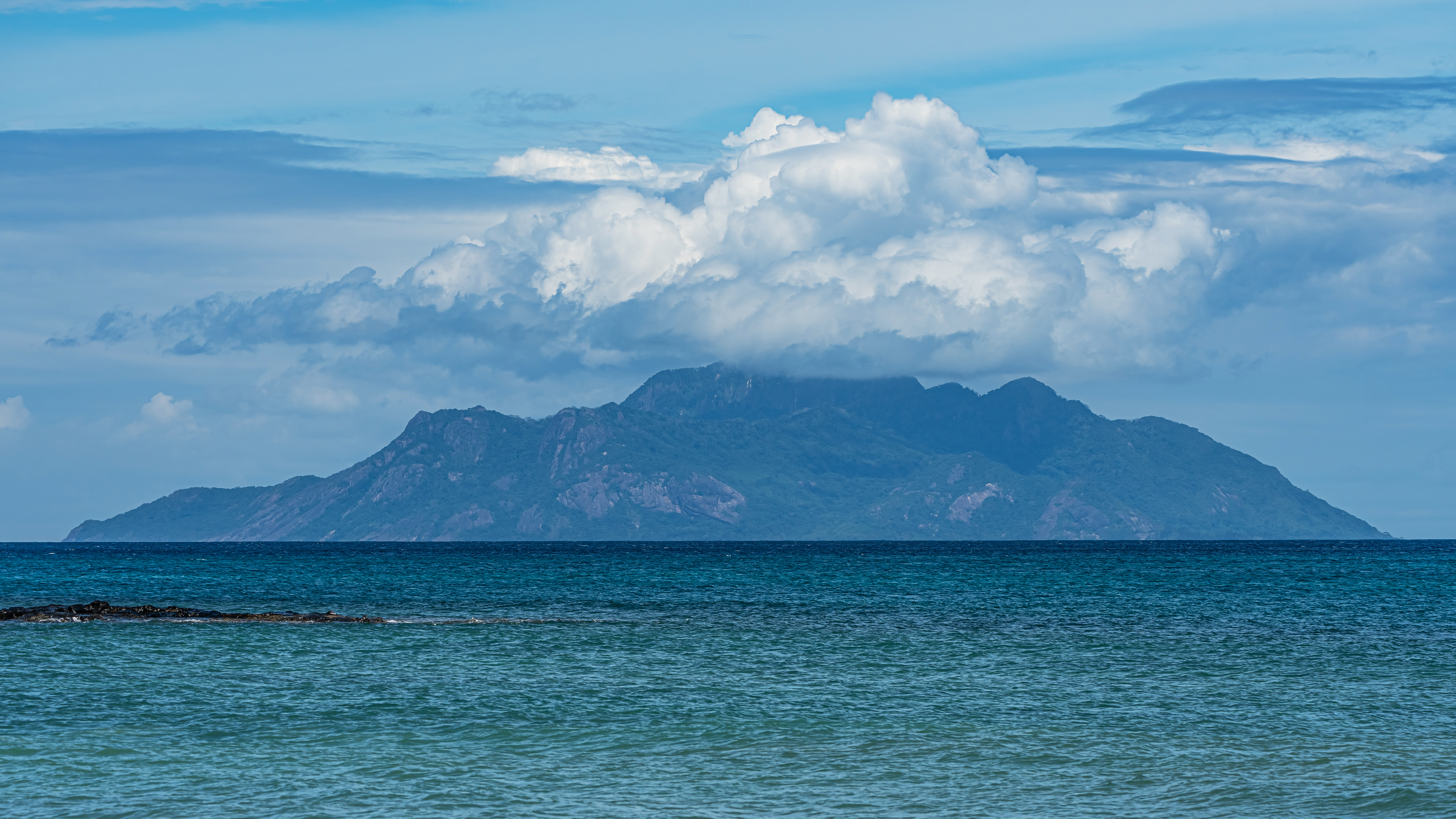

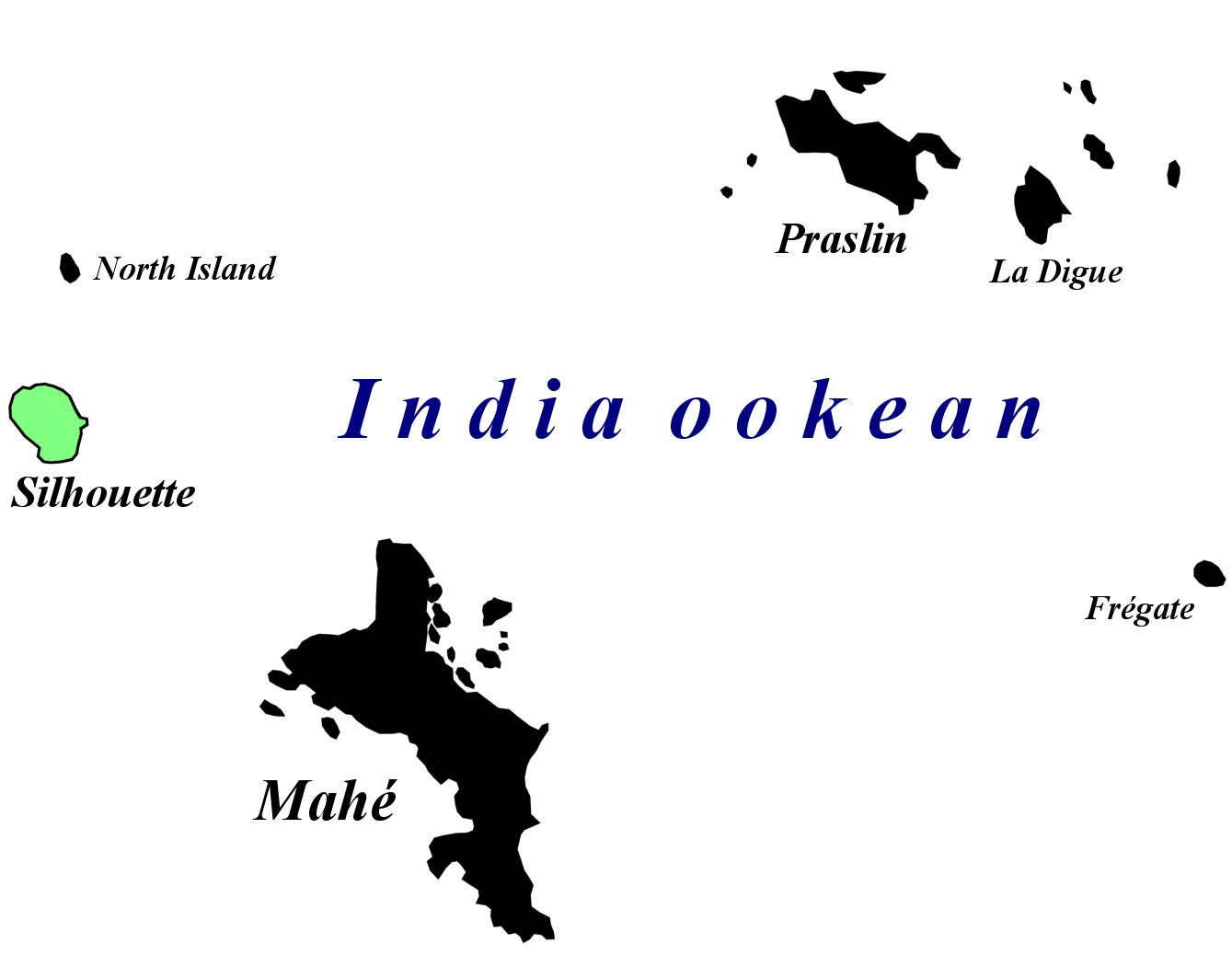
- Silhouette Island is to the northwest of Mahé

- Location in Seychelles

Geography
- Location: Seychelles
- Coordinates: 04°29′15″S 55°13′48″E
- Archipelago: Inner Islands, Seychelles
- Adjacent to: Indian Ocean
- Total islands: 1
- Major islands: Silhouette Island
- Area: 20.1 km^{2} (7.8 sq mi)
- Length: 5.3 km (3.29 mi)
- Width: 5.3 km (3.29 mi)
- Coastline: 21 km (13 mi)
- Highest elevation: 751 m (2464 ft)
- Highest point: Mont Dauban (Plaisir)

Administration
- Seychelles
- Group: Inner Islands
- Sub-Group: Granitic Seychelles
- Districts: La Digue and Inner Islands
- Island Group: Silhouette Group
- Largest settlement: La Passe (pop. ~160)

Demographics
- Population: 25 (2014)
- Pop. density: 9.95/km^{2} (25.77/sq mi)
- Ethnic groups: Creole, French, East Africans.

Additional information
- Time zone: SCT (UTC+4)
- ISO code: SC-15
- Official website: seychelles.com/experience/theislands

Silhouette Island lies 20 km (12 mi) northwest of Mahé in the Seychelles. It is the third largest granitic island in the Seychelles. It has an area of 20.1 km^{2} and has a population of 200, mostly workers on the island. The main settlement is La Passe, where Hilton Hotel is located. The name Silhouette was given after Étienne de Silhouette (1709-1767), the French minister of finances under Louis XV.

== Geography ==
The island is mountainous with five peaks over 500 m (1,600 ft) in elevation; Mont Dauban 751 m (2,464 ft), Mont-Pot-a-Eau 621 m (2,037 ft), Gratte Fesse 515 m (1,690 ft), Mont Corgat 502 m (1,647 ft) and Mont Cocos Marrons 500 m (1,600 ft). As such, it has some of the most dramatic scenery of the islands.

Though superficially similar to neighbouring islands, much of Silhouette is made up of younger syenite dated from 63 million years ago. Between Point Ramasse Tout and Point Zeng Zeng lies the only surface volcanic ash in Seychelles.

== Demographics ==
The population of 200 lives in 3 villages, Grand Barbe (no longer inhabited), which is on the west coast, Anse Mondon (no longer inhabited) and La Passe on the east coast.

== History ==
The crew of an English East India Company vessel, the Ascension, were the first humans known to step ashore on Silhouette, in 1609. The island was visited by Charles Oger, who took possession of it in the name of the King of France on 28 January 1771. Graves discovered at Anse Lascars were thought to be evidence of earlier visitors, possibly of Arabic origin (hence the name "Lascars", which is the local term for an Arab). However, when bones from the graves were taken for investigation, they were dated to around 1800, around the time of the first settlement. Also, there is a legend in the Seychelles that the corsair Jean-François Hodoul buried his treasure on Silhouette Island.

From the mid-19th century until 1960, the island was owned by the Dauban family, who were originally from France but had settled in Mauritius in 1830. The Dauban family were responsible for developing extensive plantations on Silhouette. There is a mausoleum built in the style of La Madeleine in Paris, Église de la Madeleine, where a number of the family members are buried, including Auguste Dauban, whose business ventures were so extensive he earned the nickname "the Rothschild of the Indian Ocean". The Dauban era came to an end when Henri Dauban sold the island to a French group. Following the purchase of the island by the Seychelles government in 1983, a small hotel was constructed. This was later replaced by the larger Labriz Resort which was then bought by the Hilton hotel group. The Dauban plantation house has recently been restored, and now is a museum which contains many original photos of the Dauban family.

== Flora and fauna ==
Silhouette Island is one of the richest biodiversity points in the western Indian Ocean with many endemic and threatened plant and animal species. Among the most important is the Critically Endangered Seychelles sheath-tailed bat. Two roosting caves have been located, part of a single system of passages in a boulder field. Another roost complex was discovered in 2005 and 32 bats recorded. Most of the 75 or so endemic plants of the granitic islands of Seychelles are found on Silhouette, some of them unique to the island. One of the rarest of these is the Critically Endangered Impatiens gordonii, a white-flowered relative of the well-known garden plant Busy Lizzie, only ever recorded on Mahe and Silhouette. In 1987 the surrounding waters were declared a Marine National Park. In 2010, Silhouette National Park was created protecting 93 percent of the landmass. The island is also an Important Bird Area and is considered by the Alliance for Zero Extinction to be an important site for the survival of Critically Endangered species. Conservation of the island is managed by the Island Conservation Society.

== Species of interest ==
- Seychelles sheath-tailed bat
- Seychelles giant tortoise
- Astropanax procumbens
- Seychelles kestrel
- Seychelles blue pigeon
- Lychas braueri

== Gallery ==
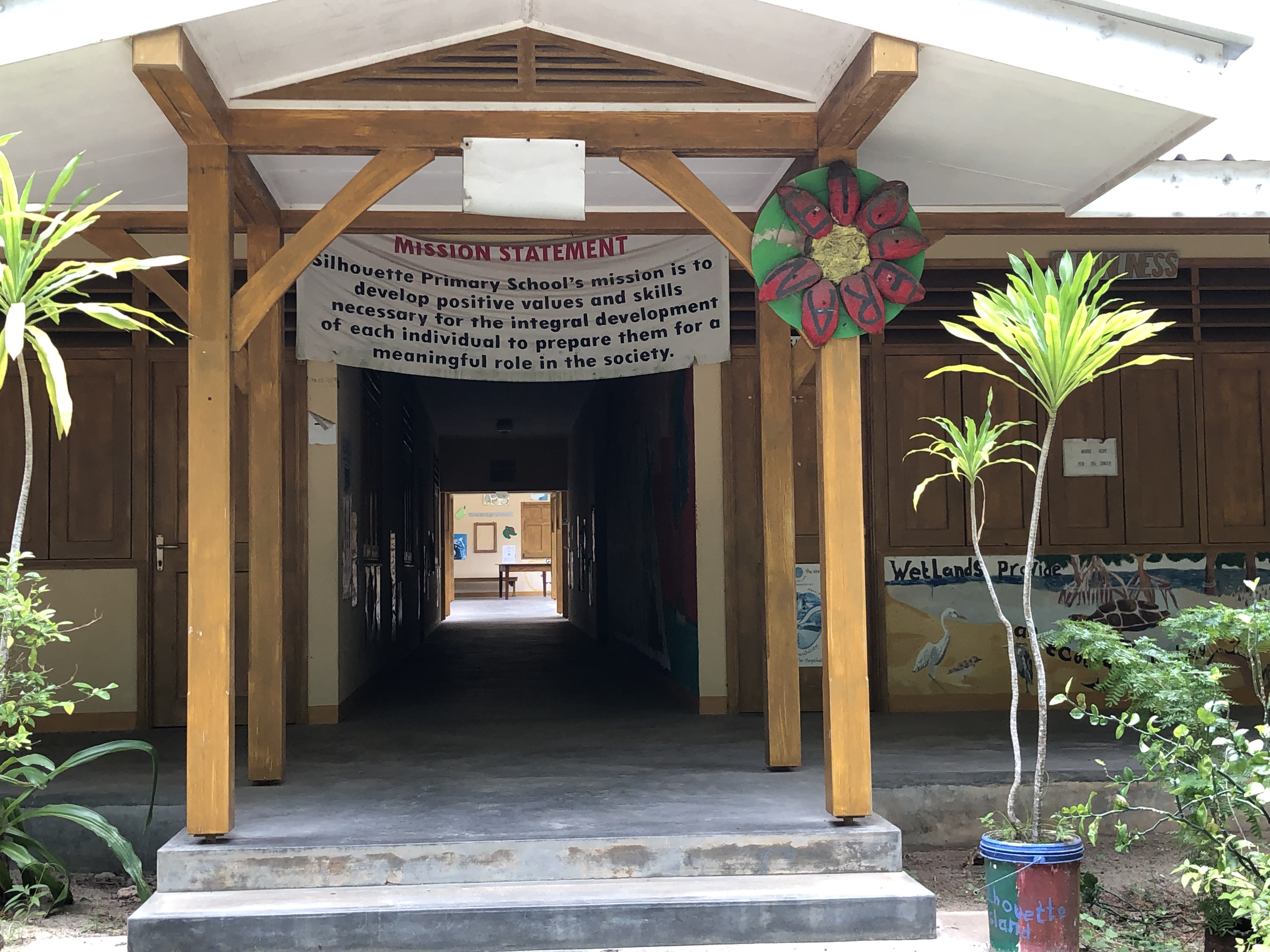
Primary School House on Silhouette Island

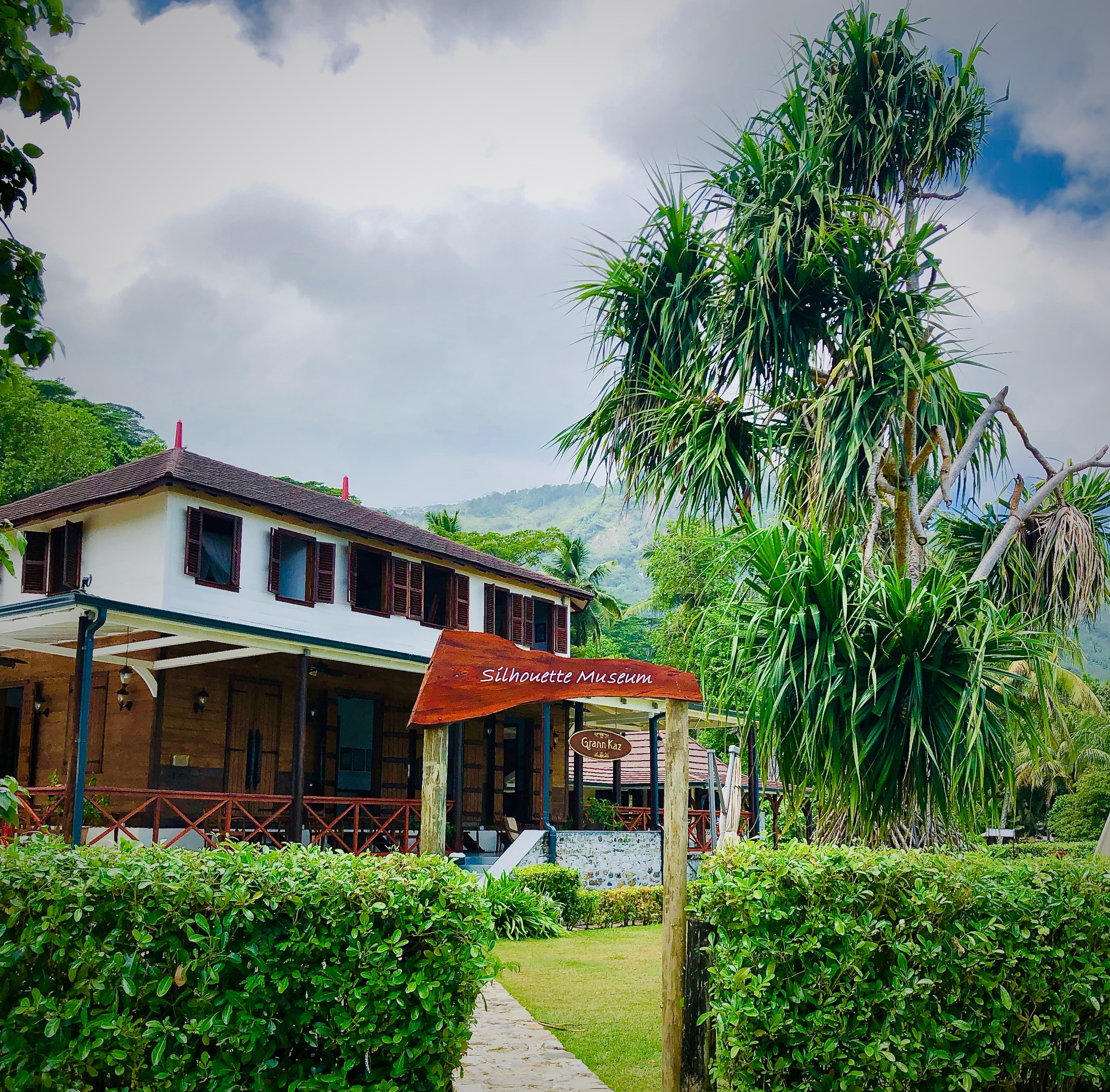
Renovated original, traditional house of the Dauban family. The Daubans bought the island in 1860.

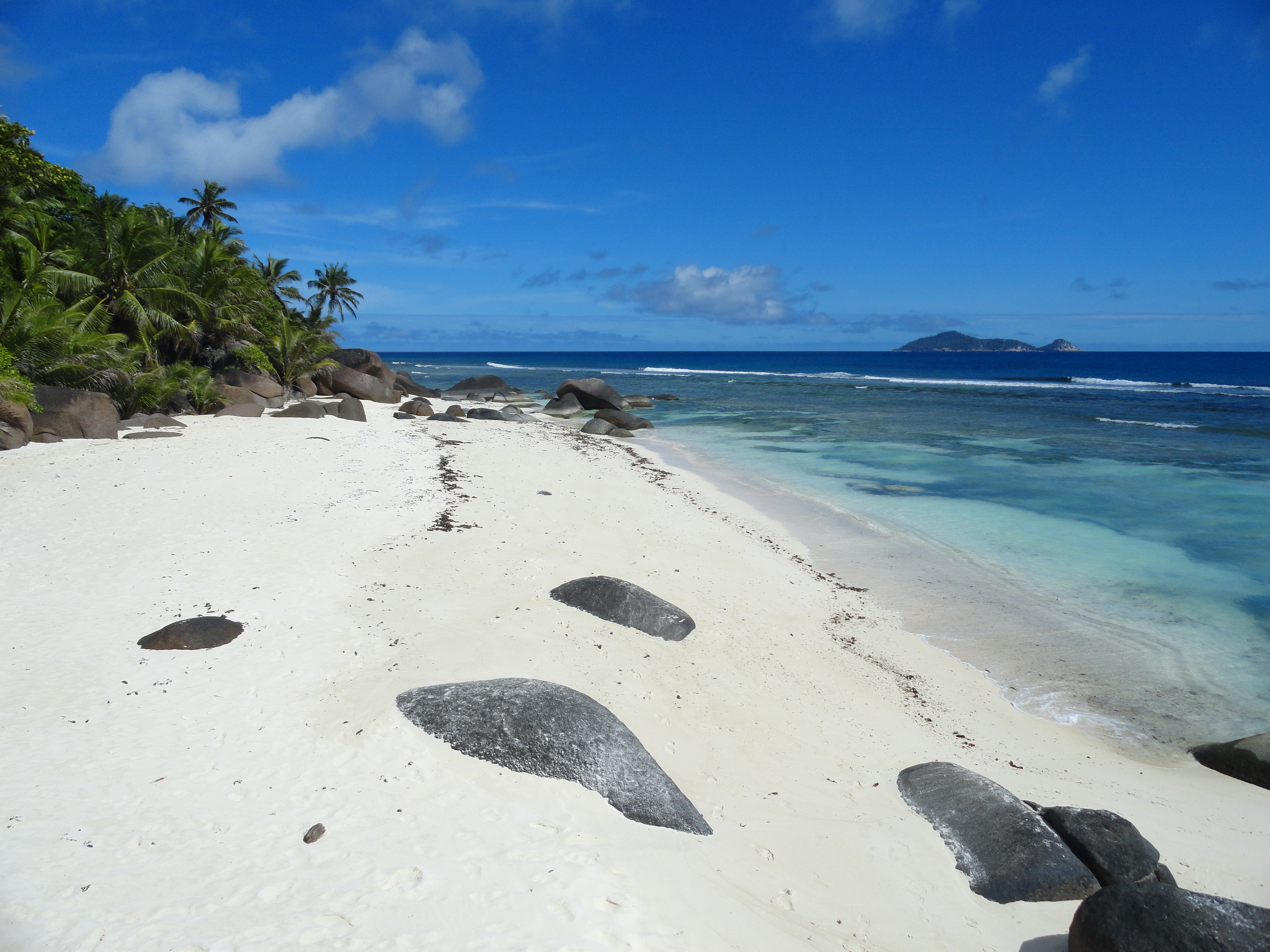
The Beach at Silhouette Island

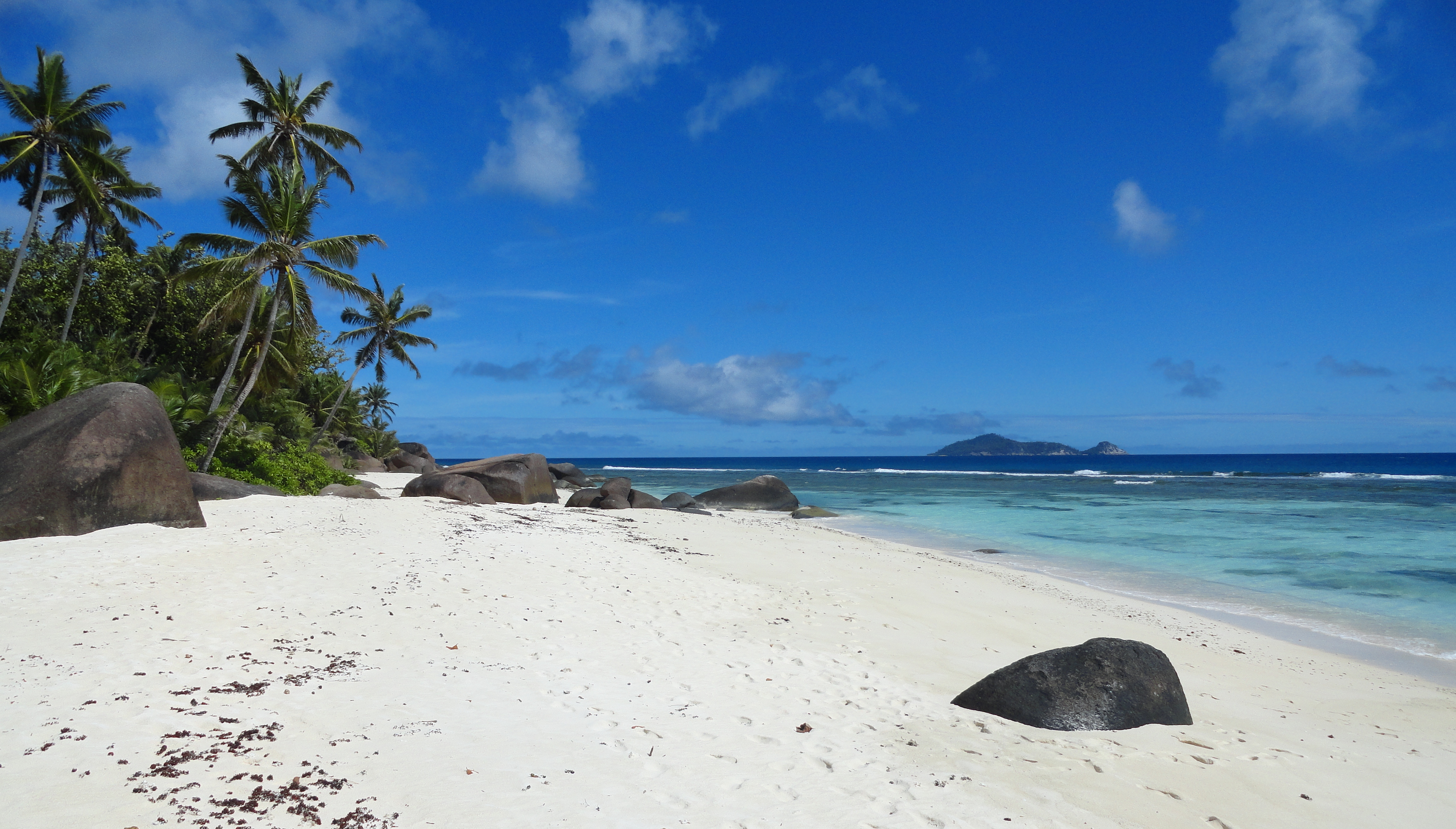
The Beach at Silhouette Island

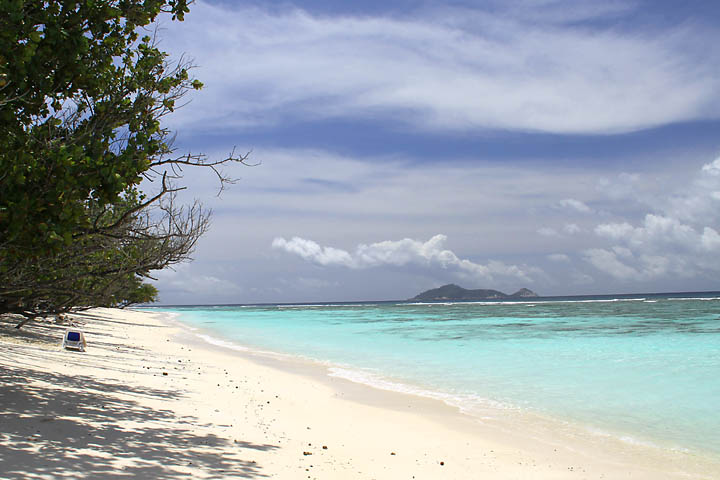
Beach near La Passe, Silhouette
