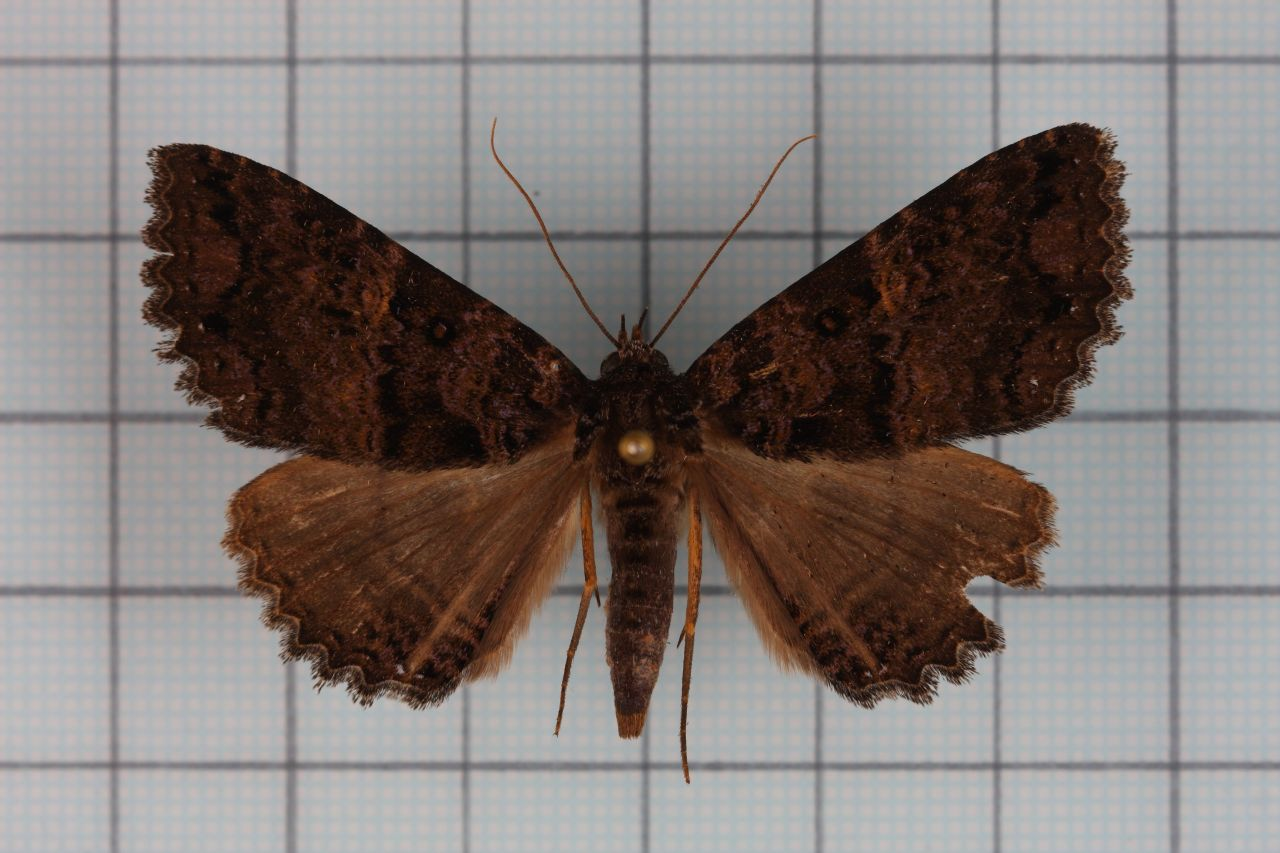

Scientific classification
- Domain: Eukaryota
- Kingdom: Animalia
- Phylum: Arthropoda
- Class: Insecta
- Order: Lepidoptera
- Superfamily: Noctuoidea
- Family: Erebidae
- Tribe: Sypnini
- Genus: Sypna
- Species: S. diversa

Binomial name
- Sypna diversa Wileman & South, 1917

= Sypna diversa =

Species of moth

Sypna diversa is a species of moth in the family Erebidae. The species is found in Taiwan.
