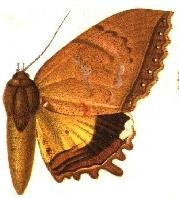
- Female

Scientific classification
- Domain: Eukaryota
- Kingdom: Animalia
- Phylum: Arthropoda
- Class: Insecta
- Order: Lepidoptera
- Superfamily: Noctuoidea
- Family: Erebidae
- Tribe: Sypnini
- Genus: Pterocyclophora
- Species: P. huntei

Binomial name
- Pterocyclophora huntei Warren, 1903

Synonyms
- Pterocyclophora pratti Druce, 1909; Pterocyclophora albiapicata Warren, 1914

= Pterocyclophora huntei =

Species of moth

Pterocyclophora huntei is a moth of the family Noctuidae first described by Warren in 1903. It is found in Seram, New Guinea, Australia and the Solomon Islands.

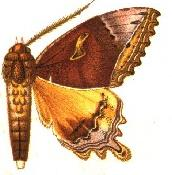
Male
