= P. ridleyi =

P. ridleyi may refer to:

- Podocarpus ridleyi, a conifer species found only in Malaysia
- Pterocyclophora ridleyi, a moth species found in Sundaland and the Philippines

== See also ==
- Henry Nicholas Ridley
