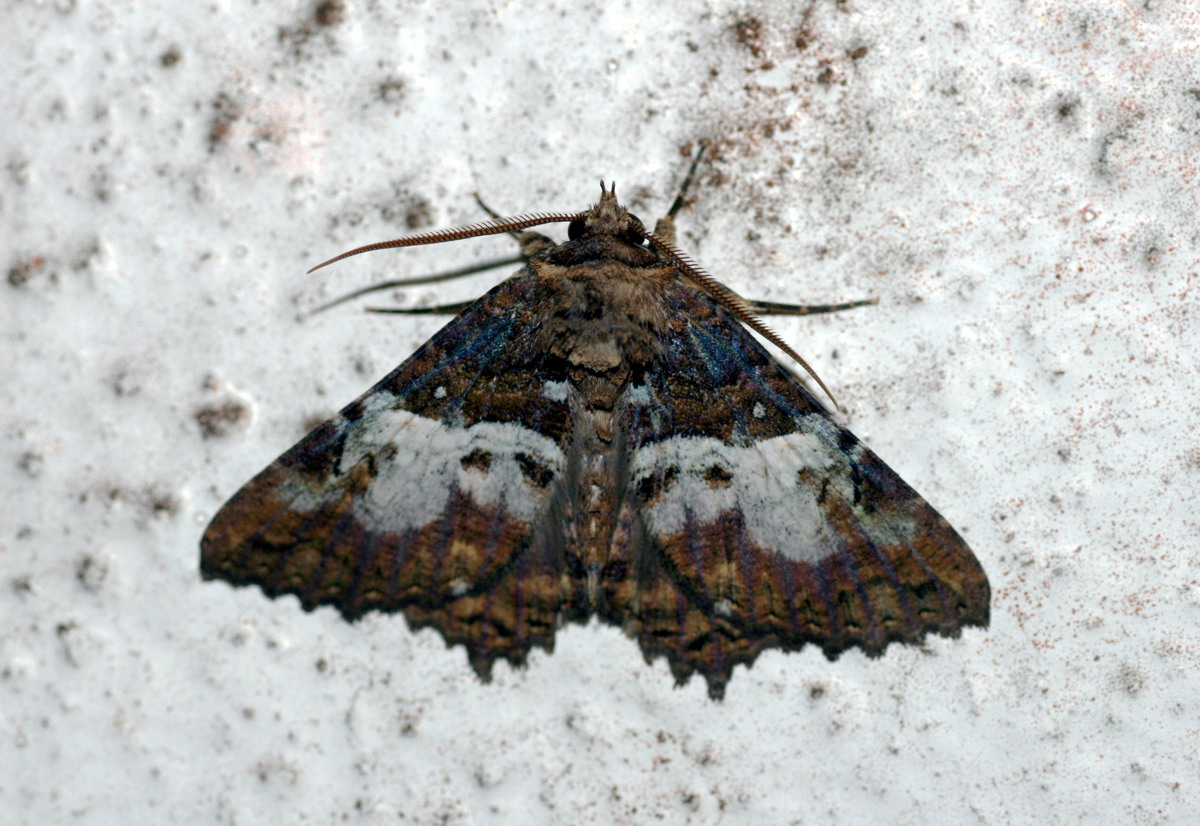

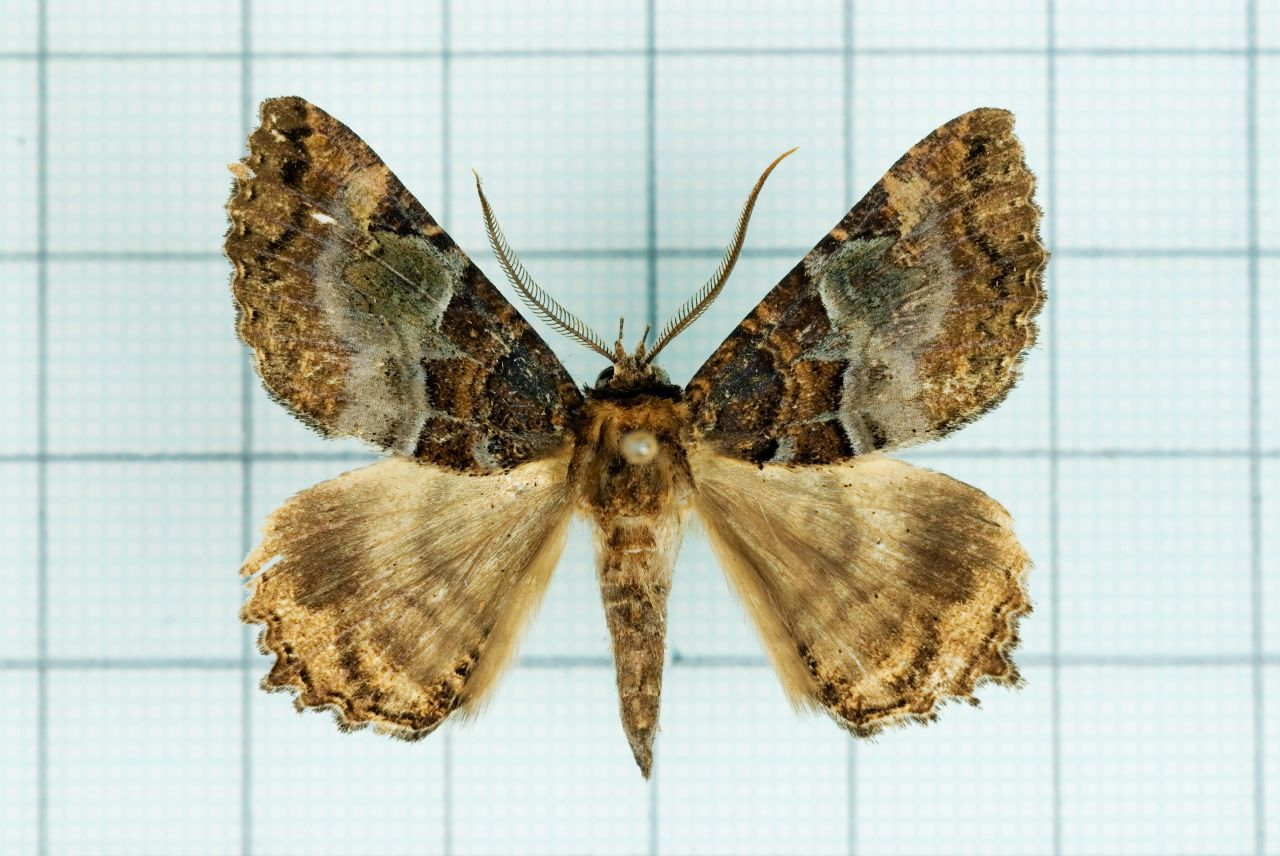

Scientific classification
- Domain: Eukaryota
- Kingdom: Animalia
- Phylum: Arthropoda
- Class: Insecta
- Order: Lepidoptera
- Superfamily: Noctuoidea
- Family: Erebidae
- Tribe: Sypnini
- Genus: Daddala
- Species: D. lucilla

Binomial name
- Daddala lucilla (Butler, 1881)

Synonyms
- Sypna lucilla Butler, 1881; Sypna obscurata Butler, 1881

= Daddala lucilla =

Species of moth

Daddala lucilla is a species of moth in the family Erebidae. The species is found in the Himalaya, Taiwan, Japan, Burma, Thailand, Sumatra, Borneo, Java, Bali and Sulawesi.

The wingspan is 48–54 mm.
