= Pterocyclophora hampsoni =

Scientific classification
- Domain: Eukaryota
- Kingdom: Animalia
- Phylum: Arthropoda
- Class: Insecta
- Order: Lepidoptera
- Superfamily: Noctuoidea
- Family: Erebidae
- Tribe: Sypnini
- Genus: Pterocyclophora
- Species: P. hampsoni

Binomial name
- Pterocyclophora hampsoni Semper, 1900

Species of moth

Pterocyclophora hampsoni is a moth of the family Noctuidae first described by Georg Semper in 1900. It is found on Luzon in the Philippines.
