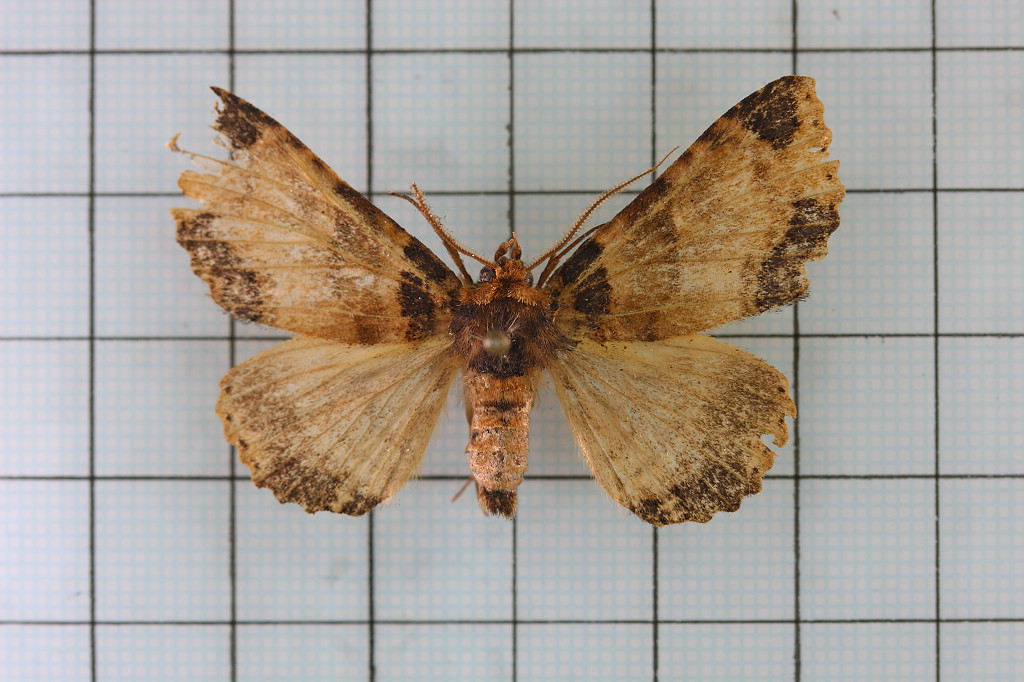

Scientific classification
- Domain: Eukaryota
- Kingdom: Animalia
- Phylum: Arthropoda
- Class: Insecta
- Order: Lepidoptera
- Superfamily: Noctuoidea
- Family: Erebidae
- Tribe: Sypnini
- Genus: Sypnoides
- Species: S. pannosa

Binomial name
- Sypnoides pannosa (Moore, 1882)

Synonyms
- Sypna pannosa Moore, 1882

= Sypnoides pannosa =

Species of moth

Sypnoides pannosa is a species of moth in the family Erebidae that was first described by Frederic Moore in 1882. It is found in India, the Himalayas, Borneo, Sumatra, Thailand and Taiwan.
