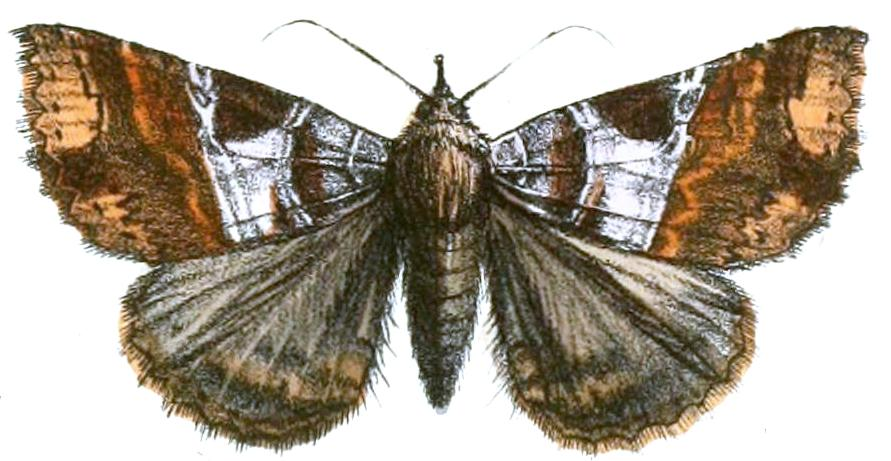

Scientific classification
- Domain: Eukaryota
- Kingdom: Animalia
- Phylum: Arthropoda
- Class: Insecta
- Order: Lepidoptera
- Superfamily: Noctuoidea
- Family: Erebidae
- Tribe: Sypnini
- Genus: Sypnoides
- Species: S. curvilinea

Binomial name
- Sypnoides curvilinea (Moore, 1867)

Synonyms
- Sypna curvilinea Moore, 1867; Supersypnoides curvilinea; Sypna fraterna Moore, 1883

= Sypnoides curvilinea =

Species of moth

Sypnoides curvilinea is a species of moth of the family Noctuidae. It is found in China and India.
