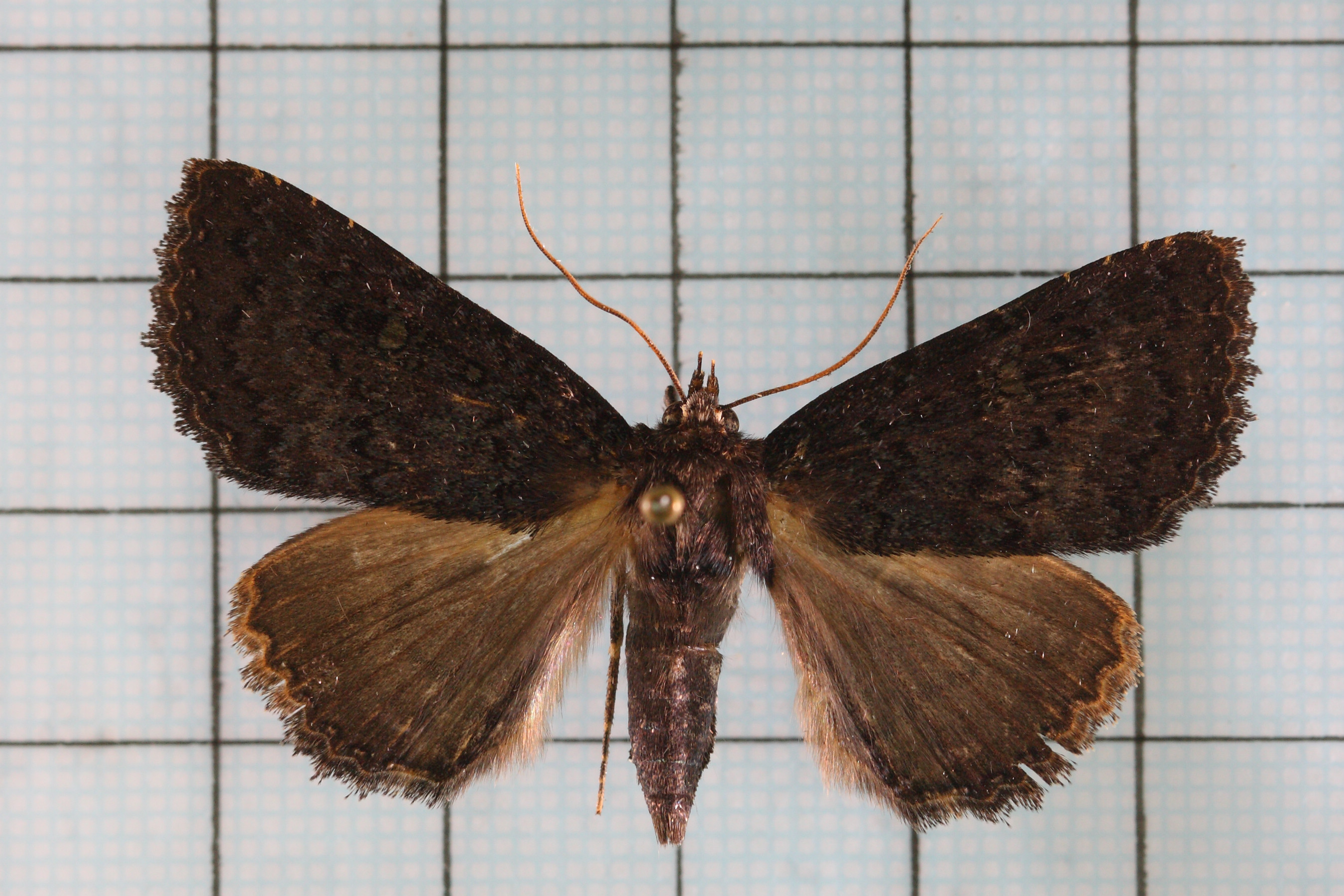

Scientific classification
- Kingdom: Animalia
- Phylum: Arthropoda
- Clade: Pancrustacea
- Class: Insecta
- Order: Lepidoptera
- Superfamily: Noctuoidea
- Family: Erebidae
- Subfamily: Erebinae
- Tribe: Sypnini
- Genus: Hypersypnoides
- Species: H. submarginata

Binomial name
- Hypersypnoides submarginata (Walker, 1865)(Walker, 1865)

Synonyms
- Hypersypnoides infrapicta Strand, 1919; Hypersypnoides submarginata Berio, 1958; Sypna submarginata Walker, 1865; Tavia submarginata Walker, 1865

= Hypersypnoides submarginata =

Species of moth

Hypersypnoides submarginata is a species of moth of the family Erebidae described by Francis Walker in 1865. It is found in India, China, Taiwan, Borneo, Java and Sumatra.

== Subspecies ==
- Hypersypnoides submarginata submarginata
- Hypersypnoides submarginata sumatrensis Berio in Berio & D. S. Fletcher, 1958 (Sumatra)
