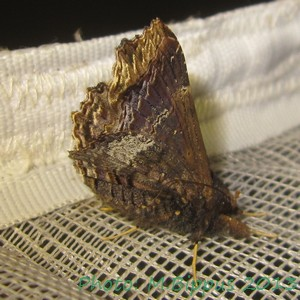
- Lacera alope

Scientific classification
- Kingdom: Animalia
- Phylum: Arthropoda
- Class: Insecta
- Order: Lepidoptera
- Superfamily: Noctuoidea
- Family: Erebidae
- Tribe: Hulodini
- Genus: Lacera; Guenée in Boisduval & Guenée, 1852

= Lacera =

Genus of moths

Lacera is a genus of moths of the family Erebidae first described by Achille Guenée in 1852.

== Description ==
Palpi with second joint reaching vertex of head and short third joint. Antennae of male minutely ciliated. Thorax and abdomen clothed with coarse hairy. Tibia very heavily tufted with hair. Forewings with arched apex and somewhat acute. The outer margin angled at center. Cilia crenulate. Hindwings with crenulate cilia. Margin produced to slight points at veins 4 and 6. Larva with four pairs of abdominal prolegs, where the first two pairs are aborted.

== Species ==
- Lacera alope Cramer, [1780]
- Lacera apicirupta Carcasson, 1965
- Lacera asinuosa Holloway, 1979
- Lacera azatothi Zilli & Hogenes, in lit
- Lacera contrasta Holloway, 1979
- Lacera nyarlathotepi Zilli & Holloway, in lit
- Lacera noctilio Fabricius, 1794
- Lacera procellosa Butler, 1879
- Lacera uniformis Holloway, 1979
- Lacera vinacea Holloway, 1979
- Lacera violacea Holloway, 1979

== Former species ==
- Lacera capella Guenée, 1852
- Lacera sublineata Walker, 1865 (Daddala)
