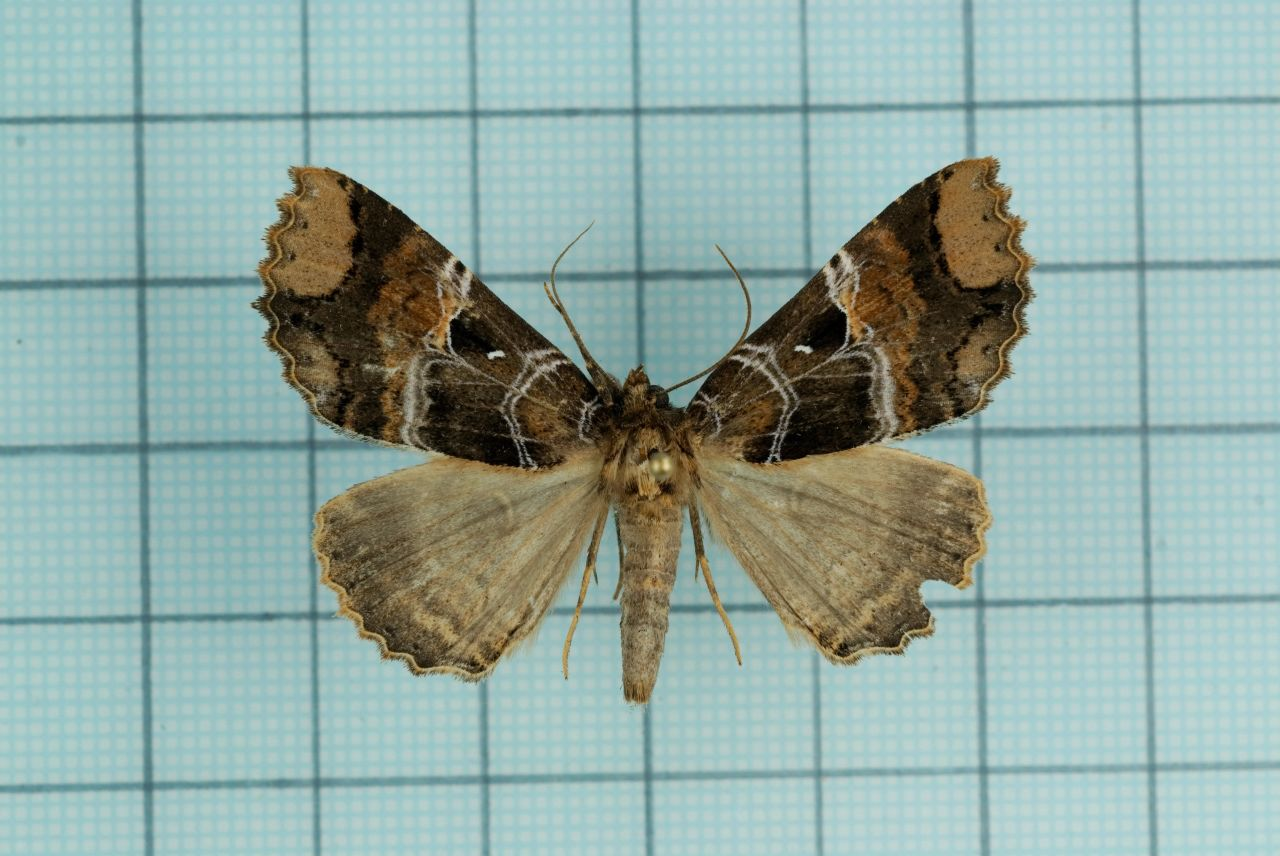
- Female
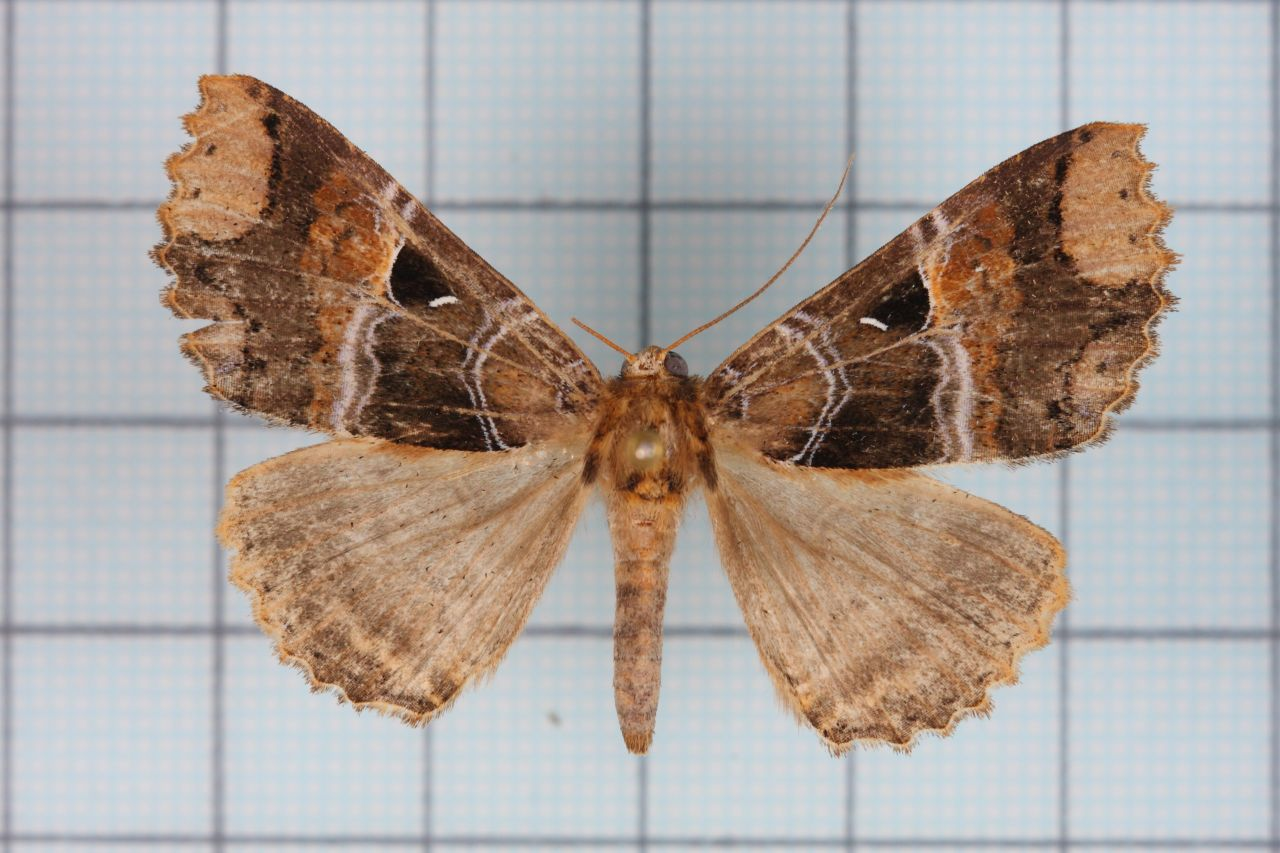
- Male

Scientific classification
- Domain: Eukaryota
- Kingdom: Animalia
- Phylum: Arthropoda
- Class: Insecta
- Order: Lepidoptera
- Superfamily: Noctuoidea
- Family: Erebidae
- Tribe: Sypnini
- Genus: Sypnoides
- Species: S. chinensis

Binomial name
- Sypnoides chinensis Berio, 1958

= Sypnoides chinensis =

Species of moth

Sypnoides chinensis is a species of moth of the family Noctuidae first described by Emilio Berio in 1958. It is found in Taiwan.
