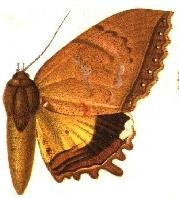
- Pterocyclophora huntei

Scientific classification
- Kingdom: Animalia
- Phylum: Arthropoda
- Class: Insecta
- Order: Lepidoptera
- Superfamily: Noctuoidea
- Family: Erebidae
- Subfamily: Erebinae
- Tribe: Sypnini
- Genus: Pterocyclophora; Hampson, 1893

= Pterocyclophora =

Genus of moths

Pterocyclophora is a genus of moths in the family Erebidae. The genus was erected by George Hampson in 1893

== Description ==
Palpi with thickened second joint and reaching vertex of head, and obliquely porrect and naked third joint. Antennae bipectinated with short branches in male. Thorax and abdomen smoothly scaled. Mid tibia spined and with terminal tuft. Hind tibia with medial and terminal tufts. Forewings with highly arched costa. Apex produced and acute. Cilia highly crenulate. Hindwing with produced outer margin to a point at vein 4. Inner margin with a deep incision at middle forming a fringed lobe. Cilia highly crenulate. Cell of both wing somewhat short.

== Species ==
- Pterocyclophora hampsoni Semper, 1900
- Pterocyclophora huntei Warren, 1903
- Pterocyclophora pictimargo Hampson, 1893
- Pterocyclophora ridleyi Hampson, 1913
