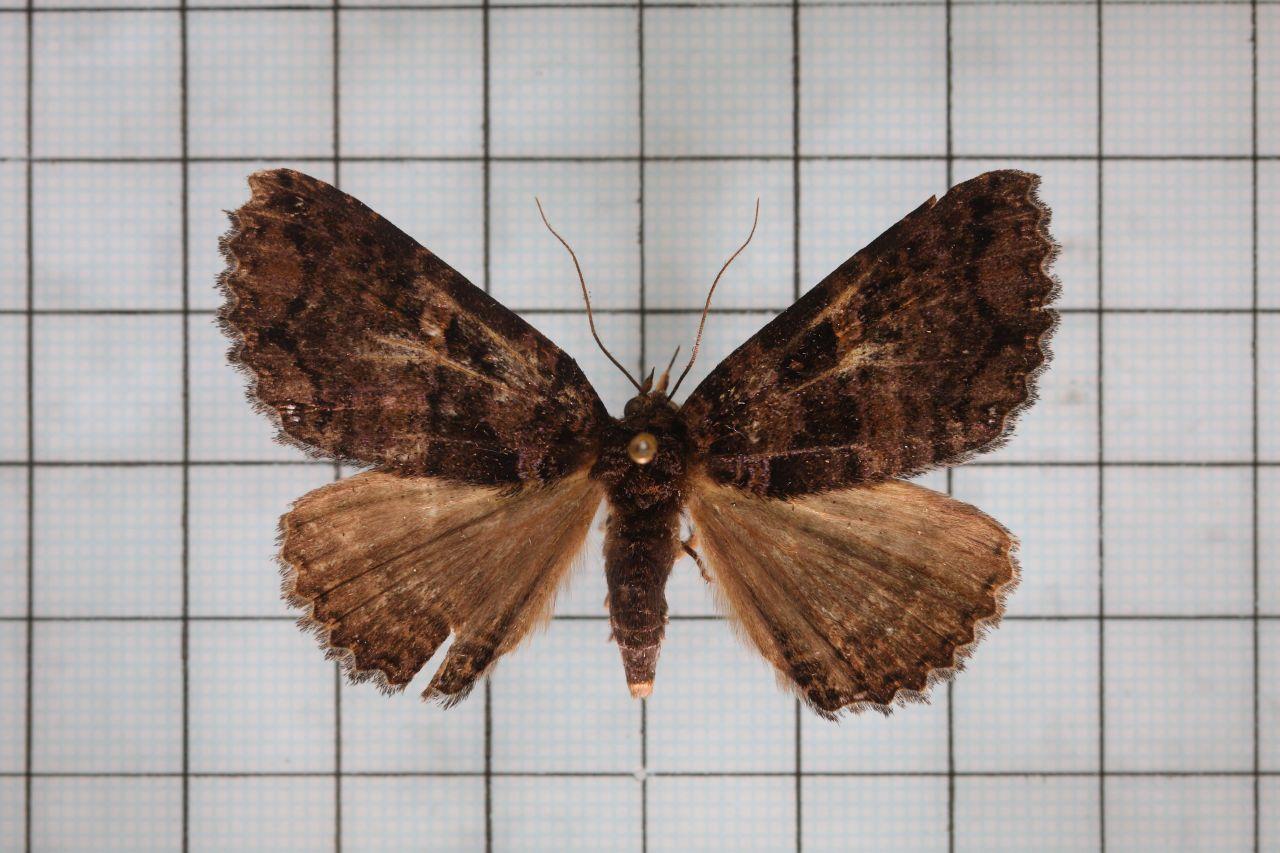
- Sypna diversa

Scientific classification
- Kingdom: Animalia
- Phylum: Arthropoda
- Class: Insecta
- Order: Lepidoptera
- Superfamily: Noctuoidea
- Family: Erebidae
- Subfamily: Erebinae
- Tribe: Sypnini
- Genus: Sypna; Guenée in Boisduval & Guenée, 1852

= Sypna =

Genus of moths

Sypna is a genus of moths in the family Erebidae. The genus was erected by Achille Guenée in 1852.

== Species ==
- Sypna albilinea Walker, 1858
- Sypna anisomeris Prout, 1926
- Sypna bella Bethune-Baker, 1906
- Sypna buruensis Prout, 1926
- Sypna coelisparsa Walker, 1858
- Sypna diversa Wileman & South, 1917
- Sypna dubitaria (Walker, 1865)
- Sypna martina (Felder & Rogenhofer, 1874)
- Sypna omicronigera Guenée, 1852
- Sypna rholatinum Prout, 1926
- Sypna sobrina Leech, 1900
- Sypna subrotunda Prout, 1926
- Sypna subsignata Walker, 1858
