= Lacera vinacea =

Scientific classification
- Kingdom: Animalia
- Phylum: Arthropoda
- Clade: Pancrustacea
- Class: Insecta
- Order: Lepidoptera
- Superfamily: Noctuoidea
- Family: Erebidae
- Genus: Lacera
- Species: L. vinacea

Binomial name
- Lacera vinacea Holloway, 1979

Species of moth

Lacera vinacea is a moth of the family Erebidae. It is found in New Caledonia.
