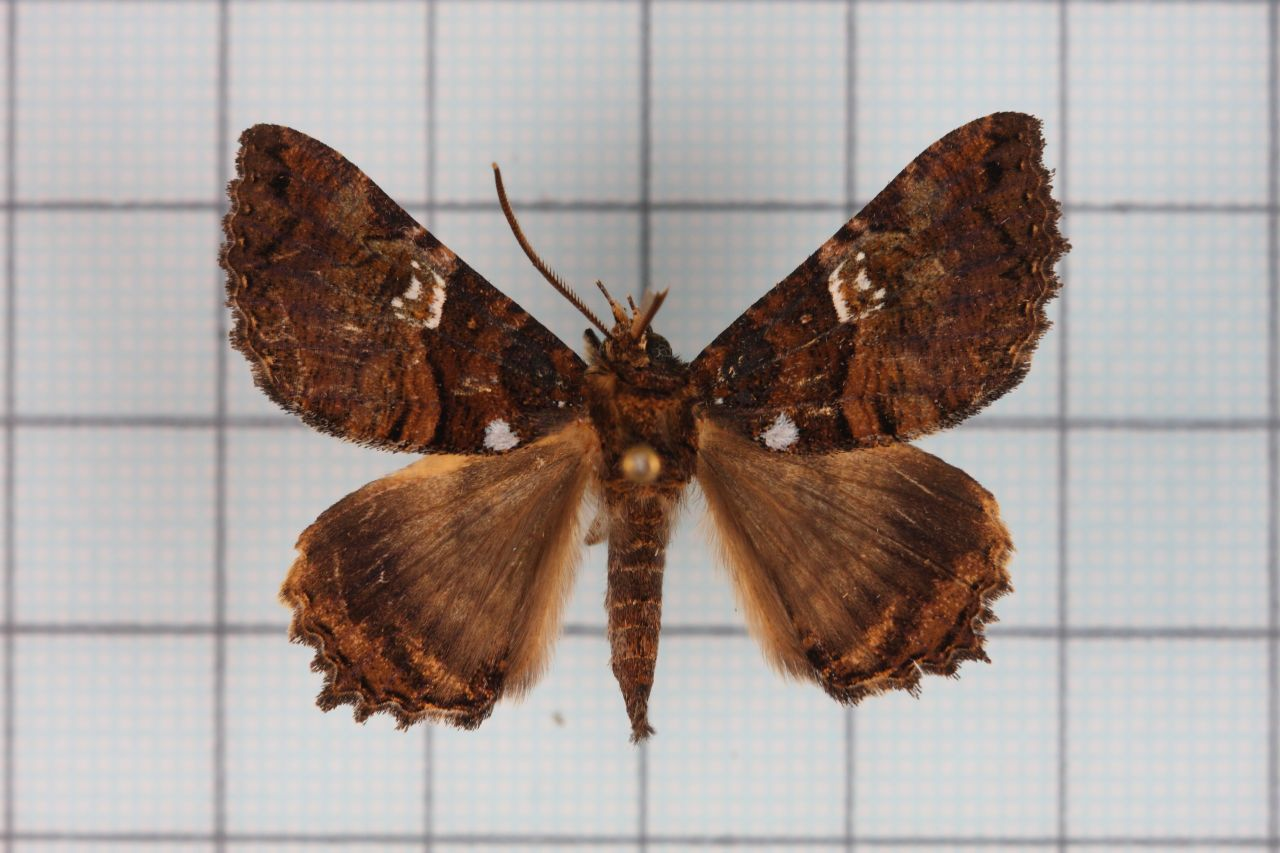

Scientific classification
- Kingdom: Animalia
- Phylum: Arthropoda
- Clade: Pancrustacea
- Class: Insecta
- Order: Lepidoptera
- Superfamily: Noctuoidea
- Family: Erebidae
- Genus: Hypersypnoides
- Species: H. formosensis

Binomial name
- Hypersypnoides formosensis (Hampson, 1926)

Synonyms
- Sypna formosensis Hampson, 1926; Othresypna burmanica Berio, 1973

= Hypersypnoides formosensis =

Species of moth

Hypersypnoides formosensis is a species of moth of the family Erebidae first described by George Hampson in 1926. It is found in Taiwan.

The wingspan is 50 mm.
