= Lacera uniformis =

Scientific classification
- Kingdom: Animalia
- Phylum: Arthropoda
- Clade: Pancrustacea
- Class: Insecta
- Order: Lepidoptera
- Superfamily: Noctuoidea
- Family: Erebidae
- Genus: Lacera
- Species: L. uniformis

Binomial name
- Lacera uniformis Holloway, 1979

Species of moth

Lacera uniformis is a moth of the family Erebidae. It is found from the Indian subcontinent and Sundaland, east to Queensland and Vanuatu.
