= Lacera azatothi =

Scientific classification
- Domain: Eukaryota
- Kingdom: Animalia
- Phylum: Arthropoda
- Class: Insecta
- Order: Lepidoptera
- Superfamily: Noctuoidea
- Family: Erebidae
- Genus: Lacera
- Species: L. azatothi

Binomial name
- Lacera azatothi Zilli & Hogenes, in prep.

Species of moth

Lacera azatothi is a moth of the family Erebidae. It is found in New Guinea.

== Taxonomy ==
Although named, the species has not been officially described.
