= Lacera procellosa =

Scientific classification
- Domain: Eukaryota
- Kingdom: Animalia
- Phylum: Arthropoda
- Class: Insecta
- Order: Lepidoptera
- Superfamily: Noctuoidea
- Family: Erebidae
- Genus: Lacera
- Species: L. procellosa

Binomial name
- Lacera procellosa Butler, 1879

Species of moth

Lacera procellosa is a moth of the family Erebidae. It is found from Japan and the Oriental tropics (China (Tibet, Qinghai), Korea, India (Assam, Meghalaya, Sikkim), Sri Lanka, Nepal, Thailand, Cambodia, Vietnam, Taiwan) to the Philippines (Luzon), Sumatra, Sulawesi, Sumbawa, Java, Lombok and New Guinea.

The wingspan is 26–28 mm.

The larvae feed on Gleditsia and possibly Caesalpinia species.
