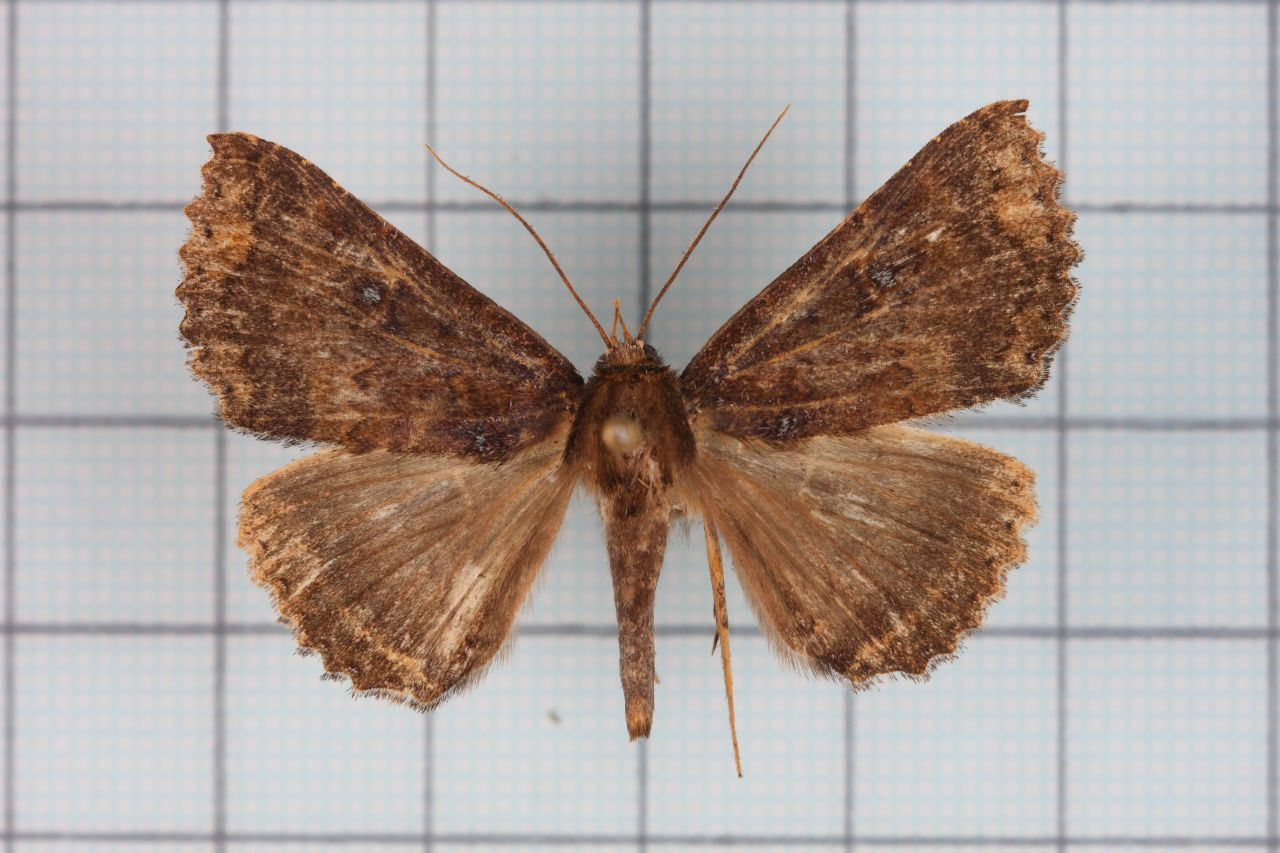
- Hypersypnoides punctosa

Scientific classification
- Domain: Eukaryota
- Kingdom: Animalia
- Phylum: Arthropoda
- Class: Insecta
- Order: Lepidoptera
- Superfamily: Noctuoidea
- Family: Erebidae
- Subfamily: Erebinae
- Tribe: Sypnini
- Genus: Hypersypnoides; Berio, 1954

Synonyms
- Hyposypnoides Berio, 1954; Othresypna Berio, 1958

= Hypersypnoides =

Genus of moths

Hypersypnoides is a genus of moths in the family Erebidae.

== Species ==
- Hypersypnoides admiratio (Prout, 1922)
- Hypersypnoides astriger (Butler, 1885)
- Hypersypnoides biocularis (Moore, 1867)
- Hypersypnoides caliginosus (Walker, 1865)
- Hypersypnoides catocaloides (Moore, 1867)
- Hypersypnoides congoensis Berio, 1954
- Hypersypnoides constellata (Moore, 1883)
- Hypersypnoides difformis Berio, 1958
- Hypersypnoides distinctus (Leech, 1889)
- Hypersypnoides fenellus (Swinhoe, 1902)
- Hypersypnoides formosensis (Hampson, 1926)
- Hypersypnoides heinrichi Laporte, 1979
- Hypersypnoides intermedius Berio, 1958
- Hypersypnoides marginalis (Hampson, 1894)
- Hypersypnoides marginatus (Leech, 1900)
- Hypersypnoides multrechti Berio, 1958
- Hypersypnoides oblongus (Berio, 1977)
- Hypersypnoides ochreicilia (Hampson, 1891)
- Hypersypnoides pela (Prout, 1926)
- Hypersypnoides perplaga Berio, 1958
- Hypersypnoides perpunctosus (Berio, 1973)
- Hypersypnoides plaga (Leech, 1900)
- Hypersypnoides postflavidus (Leech, 1900)
- Hypersypnoides pretiosissimus (Draudt, 1950)
- Hypersypnoides pseudoumbrosus (Berio, 1973)
- Hypersypnoides pulcher (Butler, 1881)
- Hypersypnoides punctosa (Walker, 1865)
- Hypersypnoides quadrinotatus (Leech, 1900)
- Hypersypnoides spodix (Prout, 1928)
- Hypersypnoides submarginata (Walker, 1865)
- Hypersypnoides subolivaceus (Walker, 1863)
- Hypersypnoides umbrosa (Butler, 1881)
