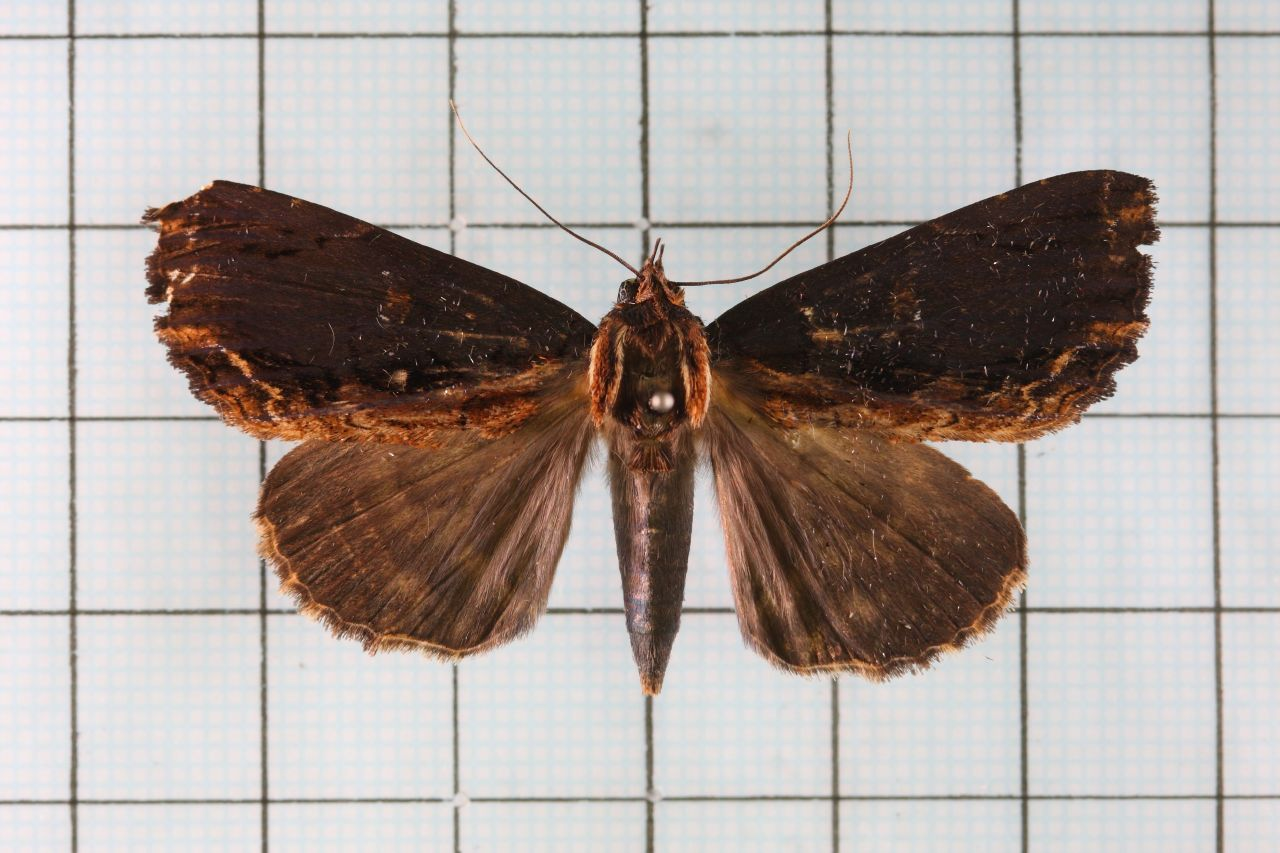

Scientific classification
- Kingdom: Animalia
- Phylum: Arthropoda
- Clade: Pancrustacea
- Class: Insecta
- Order: Lepidoptera
- Superfamily: Noctuoidea
- Family: Erebidae
- Genus: Hypersypnoides
- Species: H. umbrosa

Binomial name
- Hypersypnoides umbrosa (Butler, 1881)

Synonyms
- Hypersypnoides umbrosus; Sypna umbrosa Butler, 1881

= Hypersypnoides umbrosa =

Species of moth

Hypersypnoides umbrosa is a species of moth of the family Erebidae. It is found in Taiwan.
