= Lacera nyarlathotepi =

Scientific classification
- Kingdom: Animalia
- Phylum: Arthropoda
- Clade: Pancrustacea
- Class: Insecta
- Order: Lepidoptera
- Superfamily: Noctuoidea
- Family: Erebidae
- Genus: Lacera
- Species: L. nyarlathotepi

Binomial name
- Lacera nyarlathotepi Zilli & Holloway, in prep.

Species of moth

Lacera nyarlathotepi is a moth of the family Erebidae.

== Taxonomy ==
Although named, the species has not been officially described.
