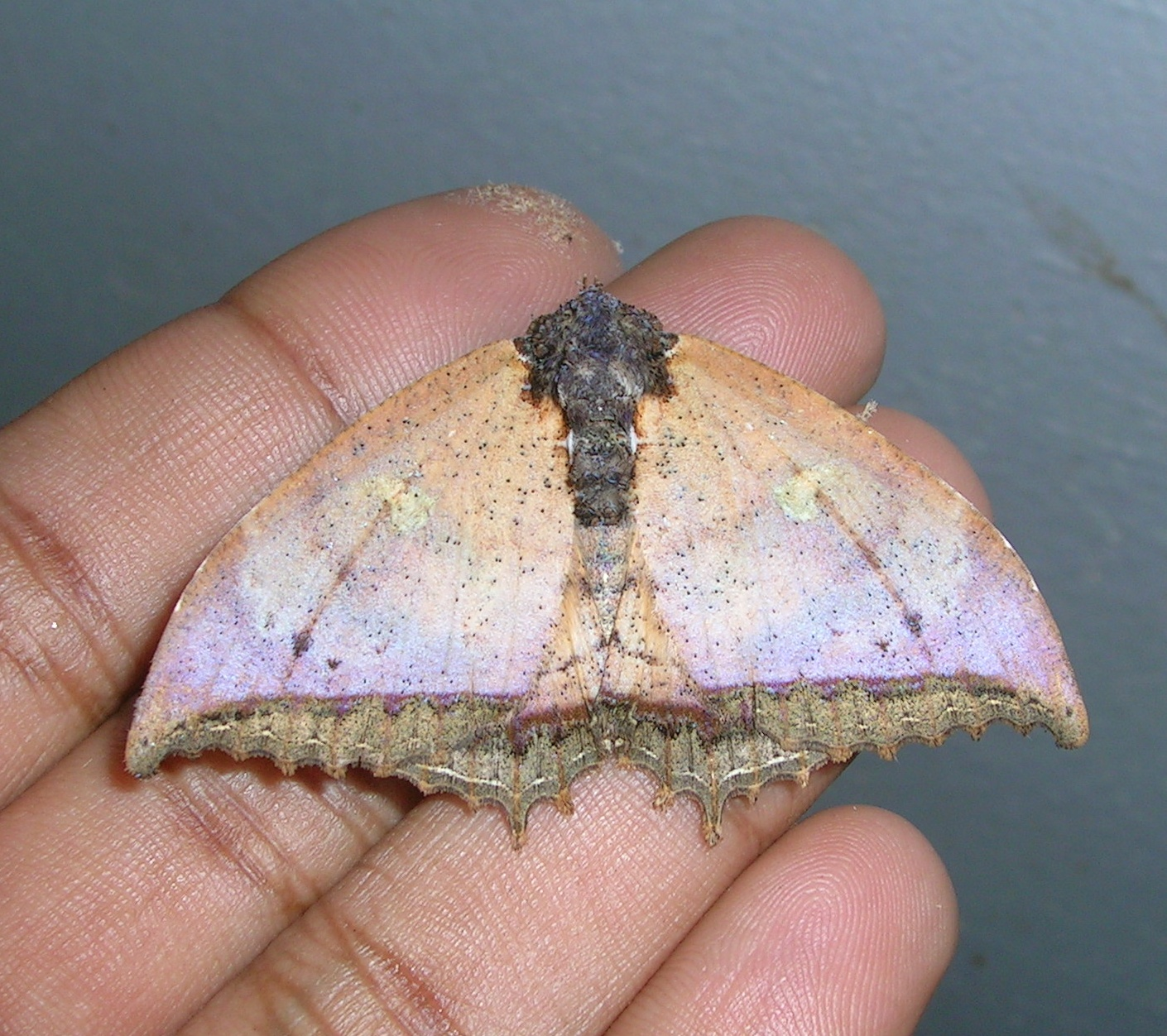

Scientific classification
- Kingdom: Animalia
- Phylum: Arthropoda
- Class: Insecta
- Order: Lepidoptera
- Superfamily: Noctuoidea
- Family: Erebidae
- Genus: Pterocyclophora
- Species: P. pictimargo

Binomial name
- Pterocyclophora pictimargo Hampson, 1893

Synonyms
- Pterocyclophora marginalis Hampson, 1893

= Pterocyclophora pictimargo =

Species of moth

Pterocyclophora pictimargo is a moth of the family Noctuidae. It was first described by George Hampson in 1893 and it is found in Sri Lanka.

== Description ==
Head, thorax and abdomen greyish, irrorated with dark brown scales. Forewings ochreous, with purplish suffusion and irrorated with dark brown scales. Reniform indistinct and pale ochreous. There are traces of a waved ferrous medial line excurved round cell and a spot beyond the cell on vein five. A straight sub-marginal ferrous line bent outwards to apex, where the area beyond it brown, with a series of ante-marginal white striga. Hindwings are yellow with brown antemedial and postmedial lines, where postmedial line is obsolete towards costa. The apical area fuscous, and outer area brown, inwardly edged by a purplish line, then a ferrous line and some ferrous suffusion. There are antemedial and marginal white lines. Ventral side is ochreous, and brown irrorated except on inner area of forewings., which has medial and postmedial brown bars. Ventral side of hindwings consist with three lines on inner area.
