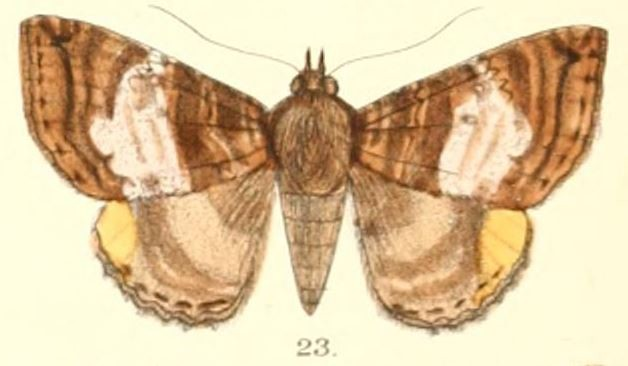

Scientific classification
- Kingdom: Animalia
- Phylum: Arthropoda
- Class: Insecta
- Order: Lepidoptera
- Superfamily: Noctuoidea
- Family: Erebidae
- Genus: Daddala
- Species: D. quadrisignata

Binomial name
- Daddala quadrisignata Walker, 1865

Synonyms
- Elpia replicata Felder, 1874; Elpia apicalis Butler, 1881; Sypna floccosa Moore, 1882; Sypna plana Moore, 1882

= Daddala quadrisignata =

Species of moth

Daddala quadrisignata is a species of moth in the family Erebidae first described by Francis Walker in 1865.

== Distribution ==
It is found in the Himalayas of India, Thailand, Malaysia, Sumatra and Borneo.
