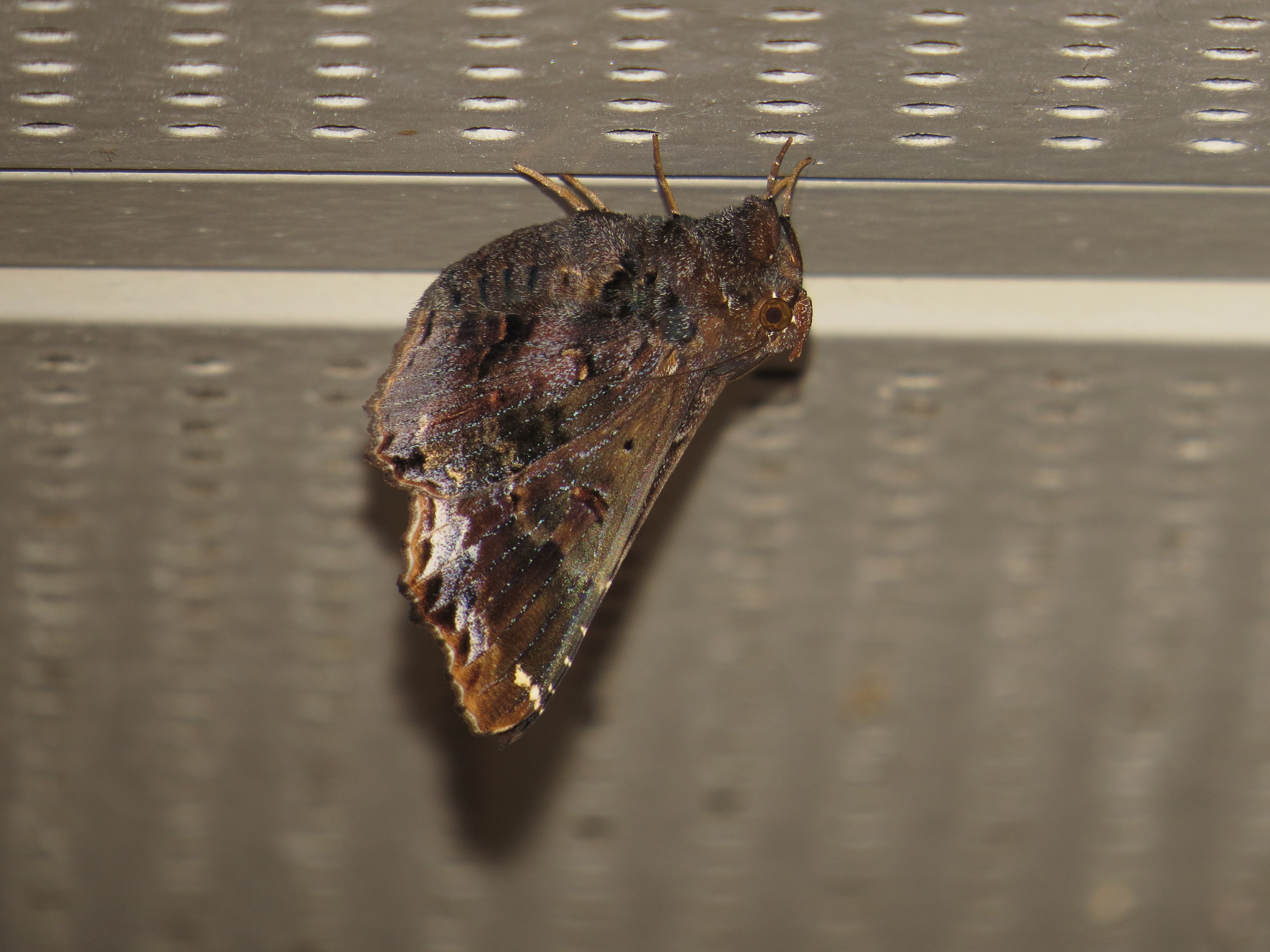

Scientific classification
- Kingdom: Animalia
- Phylum: Arthropoda
- Class: Insecta
- Order: Lepidoptera
- Superfamily: Noctuoidea
- Family: Erebidae
- Genus: Lacera
- Species: L. noctilio

Binomial name
- Lacera noctilio (Fabricius, 1794)

Synonyms
- Lacera capella Guenée, 1852; Noctua noctilio Fabricius, 1794

= Lacera noctilio =

Species of moth

Lacera noctilio is a species of moth in the family Erebidae. It is found in Africa, where it is known from Malawi and La Réunion and southern Asia, Australia and several Pacific islands (Samoa, New Caledonia, Tonga, the Marianas and Carolines).

Larvae have mostly been recorded from Leguminosae (Caesalpinia), but also on Pisonia (Nyctaginaceae), Canthium (Rubiaceae) and Verbenaceae.
