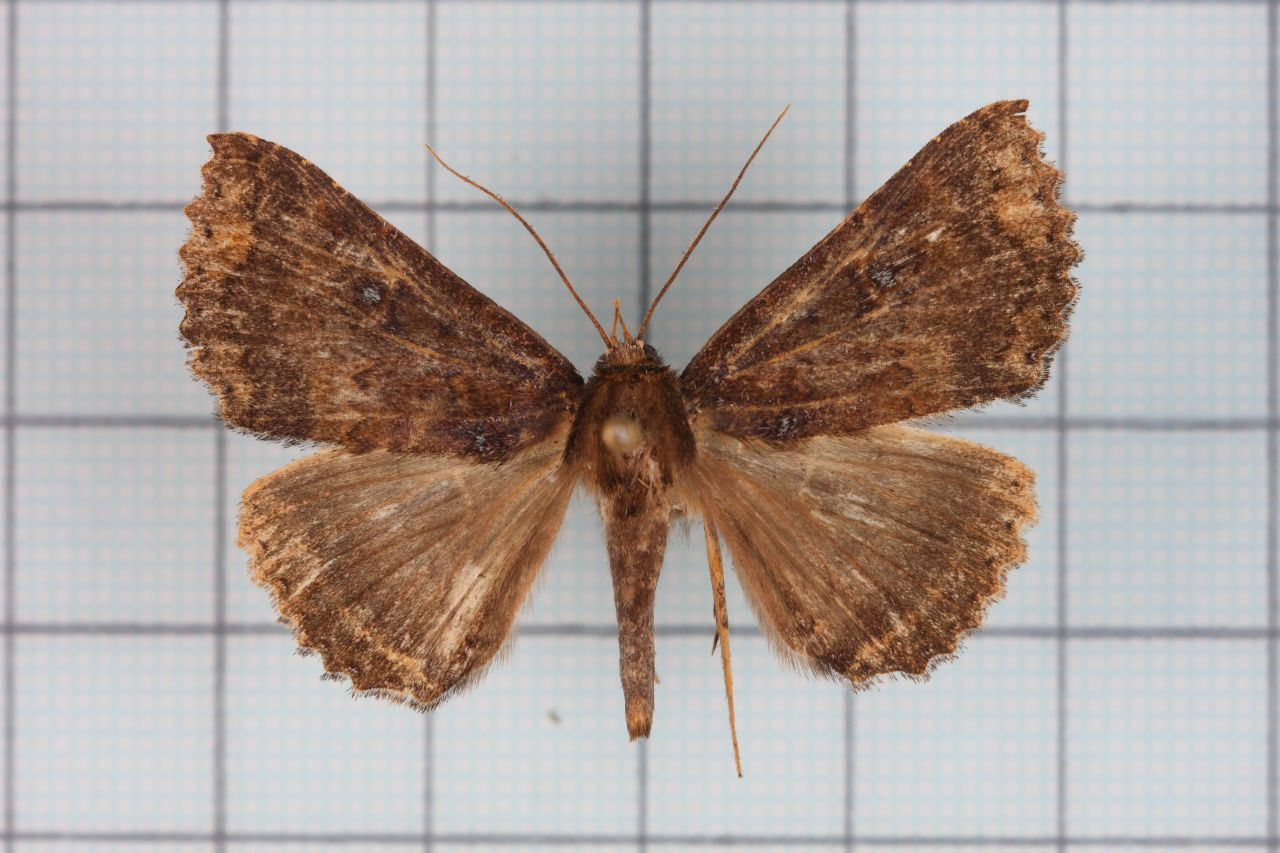

Scientific classification
- Kingdom: Animalia
- Phylum: Arthropoda
- Clade: Pancrustacea
- Class: Insecta
- Order: Lepidoptera
- Superfamily: Noctuoidea
- Family: Erebidae
- Genus: Hypersypnoides
- Species: H. punctosa

Binomial name
- Hypersypnoides punctosa (Walker, 1865)

Synonyms
- Hypersypnoides punctosus; Tavia punctosa Walker, 1865; Sypna albistigma Leech, 1900

= Hypersypnoides punctosa =

Species of moth

Hypersypnoides punctosa is a species of moth of the family Erebidae first described by Francis Walker in 1865. It is found in Taiwan.
