= Lacera apicirupta =

Scientific classification
- Domain: Eukaryota
- Kingdom: Animalia
- Phylum: Arthropoda
- Class: Insecta
- Order: Lepidoptera
- Superfamily: Noctuoidea
- Family: Erebidae
- Genus: Lacera
- Species: L. apicirupta

Binomial name
- Lacera apicirupta Carcasson, 1965

Species of moth

Lacera apicirupta is a moth of the family Erebidae. It is found in Uganda.
