= Lacera asinuosa =

Scientific classification
- Kingdom: Animalia
- Phylum: Arthropoda
- Clade: Pancrustacea
- Class: Insecta
- Order: Lepidoptera
- Superfamily: Noctuoidea
- Family: Erebidae
- Genus: Lacera
- Species: L. asinuosa

Binomial name
- Lacera asinuosa Holloway, 1979

Species of moth

Lacera asinuosa is a moth of the family Erebidae. It is found on Java, Bali and Flores and in New Guinea. The habitat consists of montane areas.
