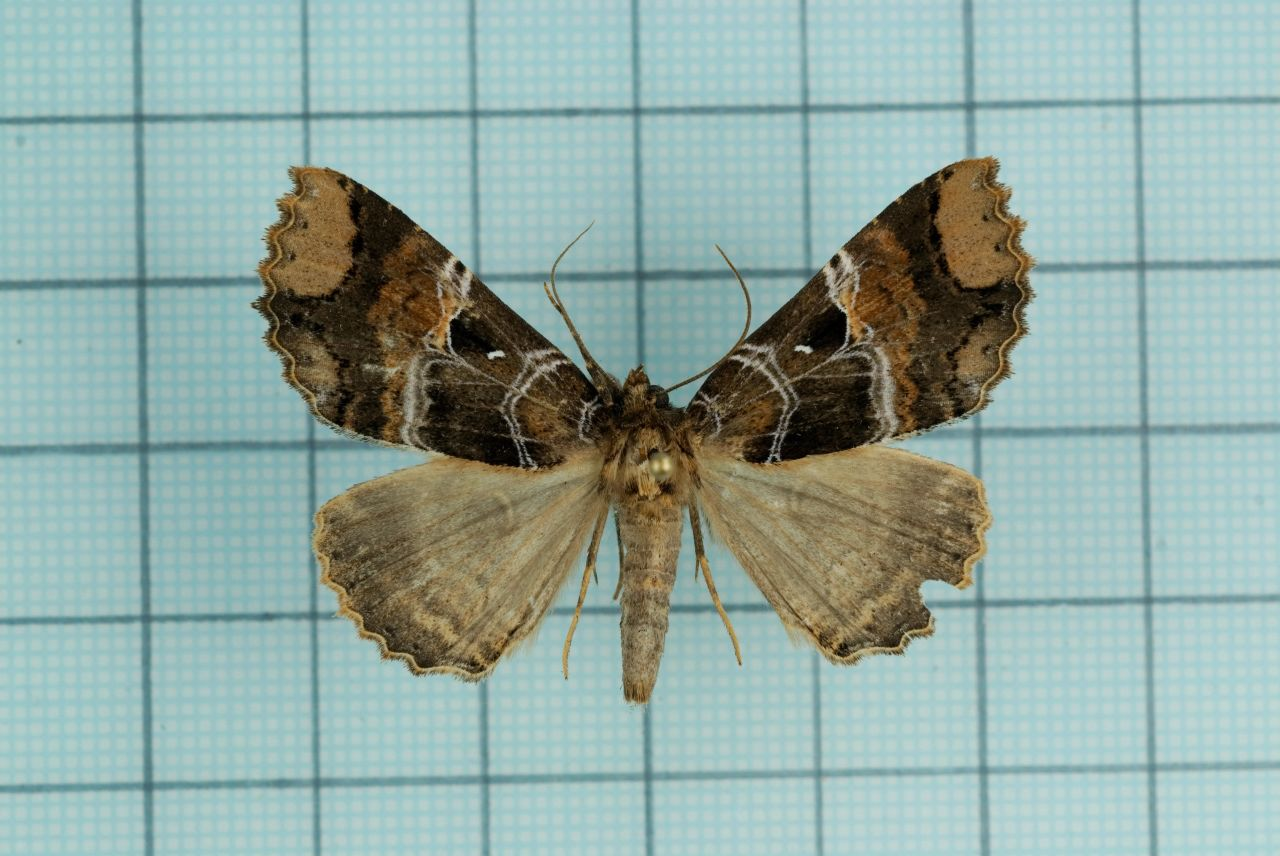
- Sypnoides chinensis
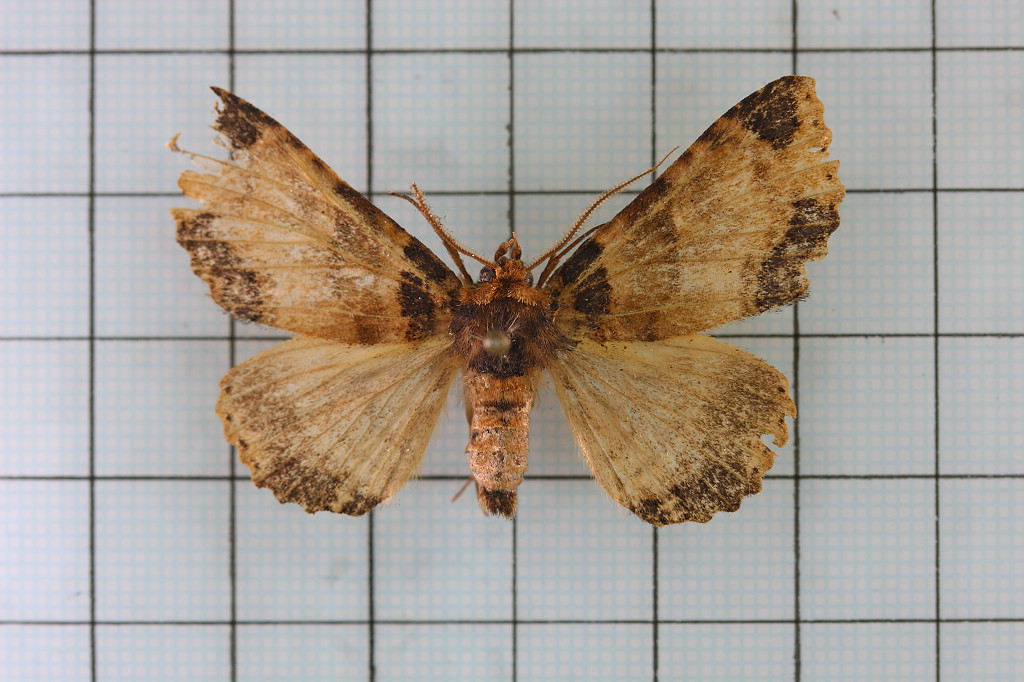
- Sypnoides pannosa

Scientific classification
- Kingdom: Animalia
- Phylum: Arthropoda
- Class: Insecta
- Order: Lepidoptera
- Superfamily: Noctuoidea
- Family: Erebidae
- Subfamily: Erebinae
- Tribe: Sypnini
- Genus: Sypnoides; Hampson, 1913

Synonyms
- Equatosypna Berio, 1960; Psynoides Berio, 1960; Supersypnoides Berio, 1958

= Sypnoides =

Genus of moths

Sypnoides is a genus of moths in the family Erebidae.

== Species ==
- Sypnoides amplifascia (Warren 1914)
- Sypnoides chinensis Berio 1958
- Sypnoides curvilinea (Moore 1867)
- Sypnoides cyanivitta (Moore 1867)
- Sypnoides delphinensis Viette 1966
- Sypnoides equatorialis (Holland 1894)
- Sypnoides erebina (Hampson 1926)
- Sypnoides flandriana (Berio 1954)
- Sypnoides fletcheri Berio 1958
- Sypnoides fumosa (Butler 1877)
- Sypnoides gluta (Swinhoe 1906)
- Sypnoides hampsoni (Wileman & South 1917)
- Sypnoides hercules (Butler 1881)
- Sypnoides hoenei Berio 1958
- Sypnoides infernalis Berio 1958
- Sypnoides kirbyi (Butler 1881)
- Sypnoides latifasciata Berio 1958
- Sypnoides lilacina (Leech 1900)
- Sypnoides malaisei (Berio 1973)
- Sypnoides mandarina (Leech 1900)
- Sypnoides missionaria Berio 1958
- Sypnoides moorei (Butler 1881)
- Sypnoides olena (Swinhoe 1893)
- Sypnoides pannosa (Moore 1882)
- Sypnoides parva Berio 1958
- Sypnoides picta (Butler 1877)
- Sypnoides prunosa (Moore 1883)
- Sypnoides pseudosabulosa (Berio 1973)
- Sypnoides rectilinea (Moore 1867)
- Sypnoides reticulata Berio 1958
- Sypnoides rubrifascia (Moore 1883)
- Sypnoides simplex (Leech 1900)
- Sypnoides vicina Berio 1958
