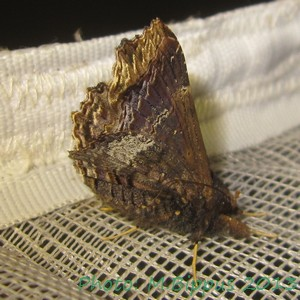

Scientific classification
- Domain: Eukaryota
- Kingdom: Animalia
- Phylum: Arthropoda
- Class: Insecta
- Order: Lepidoptera
- Superfamily: Noctuoidea
- Family: Erebidae
- Genus: Lacera
- Species: L. alope

Binomial name
- Lacera alope (Cramer, 1780)

Synonyms
- Phalaena alope Cramer, 1780

= Lacera alope =

Toothed drab

Species of moth

Lacera alope, the toothed drab, is a moth of the family Erebidae. The species was first described by Pieter Cramer in 1780. It is found in Africa, where it is known from southern and eastern Africa, including several islands of the Indian Ocean, Saudi Arabia, and southern Asia from India, Sri Lanka to China.

== Description ==
Its wingspan is about 48–64 mm. Body dark reddish brown slightly irrorated with grey. Forewings with traces of sub-basal line. A curved slightly dentate antemedial black line and an obscure reniform spot with an indistinct figure-of-8-shaped mark above it. A very irregularly dentate postmedial line excurved beyond the cell present. There is a pale mark with black streaks on the veins in the sinus and a pale mark on it can be seen above inner margin. The outer area variegated with pale brown and fuscous. Hindwings with indistinct wave postmedial line and a marginal dark line with some blue-grey specks found on it. Ventral side with outer area of forewings variegated with reds and purples. A brown speckled yellow patch can be seen at apex.

Larva greenish with dark dorsal stria. Somites 4 to 11 with dark specks and a sub-lateral series of similar specks present. Legs and tow dorsal prominences on 11th segment dark. Larva feeds on Caesalpinia, Canthium, Cissampelos, Macadamia plants.
