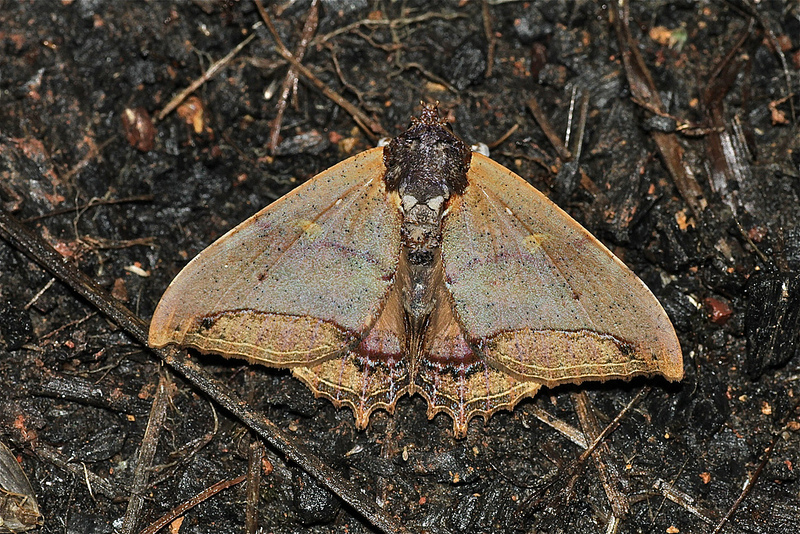
- Male from Sabah on Borneo

Scientific classification
- Kingdom: Animalia
- Phylum: Arthropoda
- Class: Insecta
- Order: Lepidoptera
- Superfamily: Noctuoidea
- Family: Erebidae
- Genus: Pterocyclophora
- Species: P. ridleyi

Binomial name
- Pterocyclophora ridleyi Hampson, 1893

= Pterocyclophora ridleyi =

Species of moth

Pterocyclophora ridleyi is a noctuid moth in the family Erebidae, subfamily Erebinae. The species was first described by George Hampson in 1893 and it is rather uncommon, with records mostly from lowland forests. It is found in Sundaland and the Philippines.

The facies and the strikingly tailed hindwing margin render the species unmistakable. There is some sexual dimorphism, females having paler, less grey forewings with a darker marginal area.
