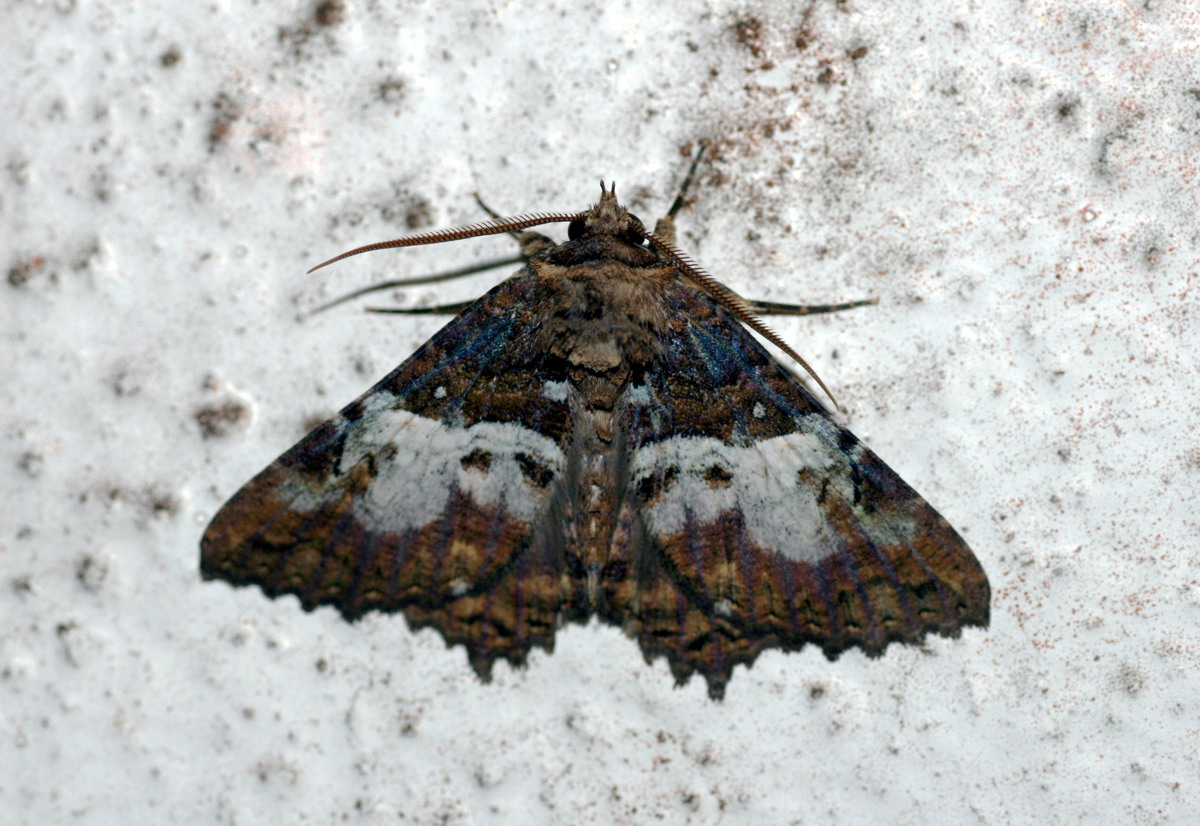
- Daddala lucilla

Scientific classification
- Kingdom: Animalia
- Phylum: Arthropoda
- Class: Insecta
- Order: Lepidoptera
- Superfamily: Noctuoidea
- Family: Erebidae
- Subfamily: Erebinae
- Tribe: Sypnini
- Genus: Daddala; Walker, 1865

Synonyms
- Elpia Walker, 1865

= Daddala =

Genus of moths

Daddala is a genus of moths in the family Erebidae erected by Francis Walker in 1865. The genus is exclusively Indo-Australian, extending from the Indian Subregion to New Guinea.

== Selected species ==
- Daddala achaeoides Walker, 1865
- Daddala anguilinea Bethune-Baker, 1906
- Daddala avola Bethune-Baker, 1906
- Daddala berioi Kobes, 1985
- Daddala brevicauda (Wileman & South, 1921)
- Daddala columba Kobes, 1985
- Daddala lucia Kobes, 1985
- Daddala lucilla (Butler, 1881)
- Daddala lucillina Kobes, 1985
- Daddala microdesma (A. E. Prout, 1928)
- Daddala quadrisignata Walker, 1865
- Daddala renisigna Moore, 1883
- Daddala sublineata (Walker, 1865)
