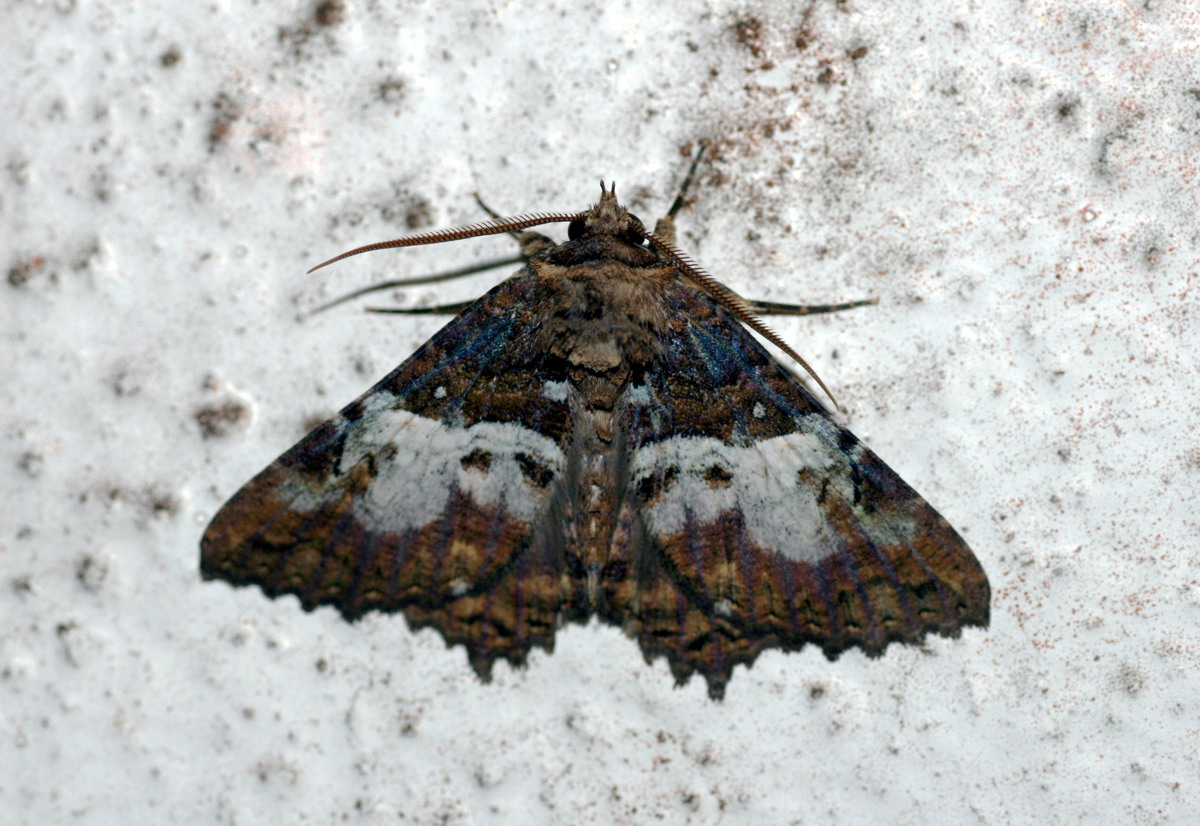

Scientific classification
- Kingdom: Animalia
- Phylum: Arthropoda
- Clade: Pancrustacea
- Class: Insecta
- Order: Lepidoptera
- Superfamily: Noctuoidea
- Family: Erebidae
- Subfamily: Erebinae
- Tribe: Sypnini; Holloway, 2005

= Sypnini =

Tribe of moths

The Sypnini are a tribe of moths in the family Erebidae.

== Genera ==
- Daddala
- Hypersypnoides
- Pterocyclophora
- Sypna
- Sypnoides
