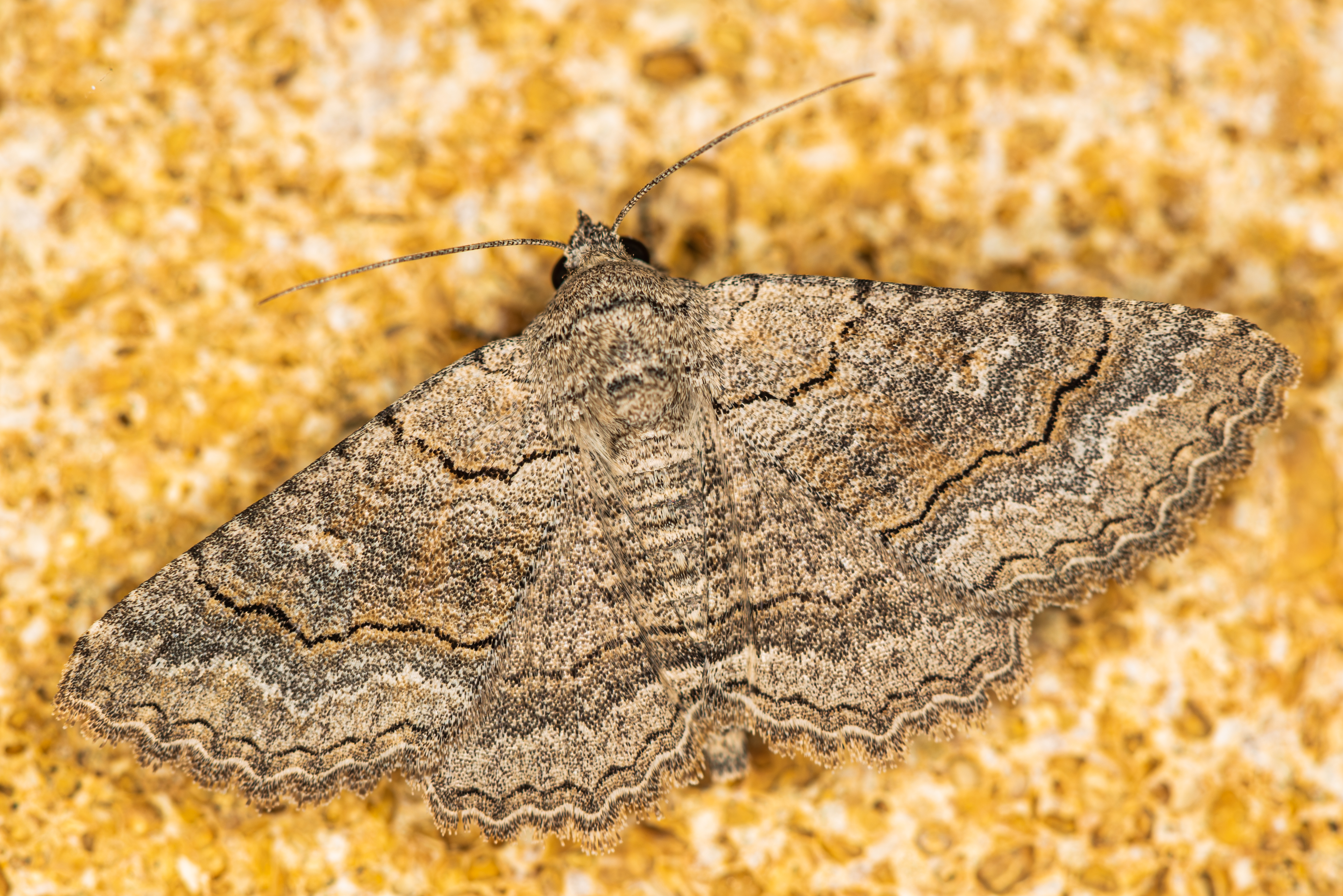

Scientific classification
- Kingdom: Animalia
- Phylum: Arthropoda
- Class: Insecta
- Order: Lepidoptera
- Superfamily: Noctuoidea
- Family: Erebidae
- Genus: Pericyma
- Species: P. albidentaria

Binomial name
- Pericyma albidentaria (Freyer, 1842)

Synonyms
- Acidalia albidentaria

= Pericyma albidentaria =

Species of moth

Pericyma albidentaria is a moth of the family Erebidae first described by Christian Friedrich Freyer in 1842. It is found in south-eastern Europe, the Near East, the Middle East, Afghanistan, Iran, Iraq, Syria, Turkey, Cyprus and Israel.

There are two generations per year. Adults are on wing from March to June and August to September.

The larvae feed on Alhagi species, including Alhagi camelorum.

== Gallery ==
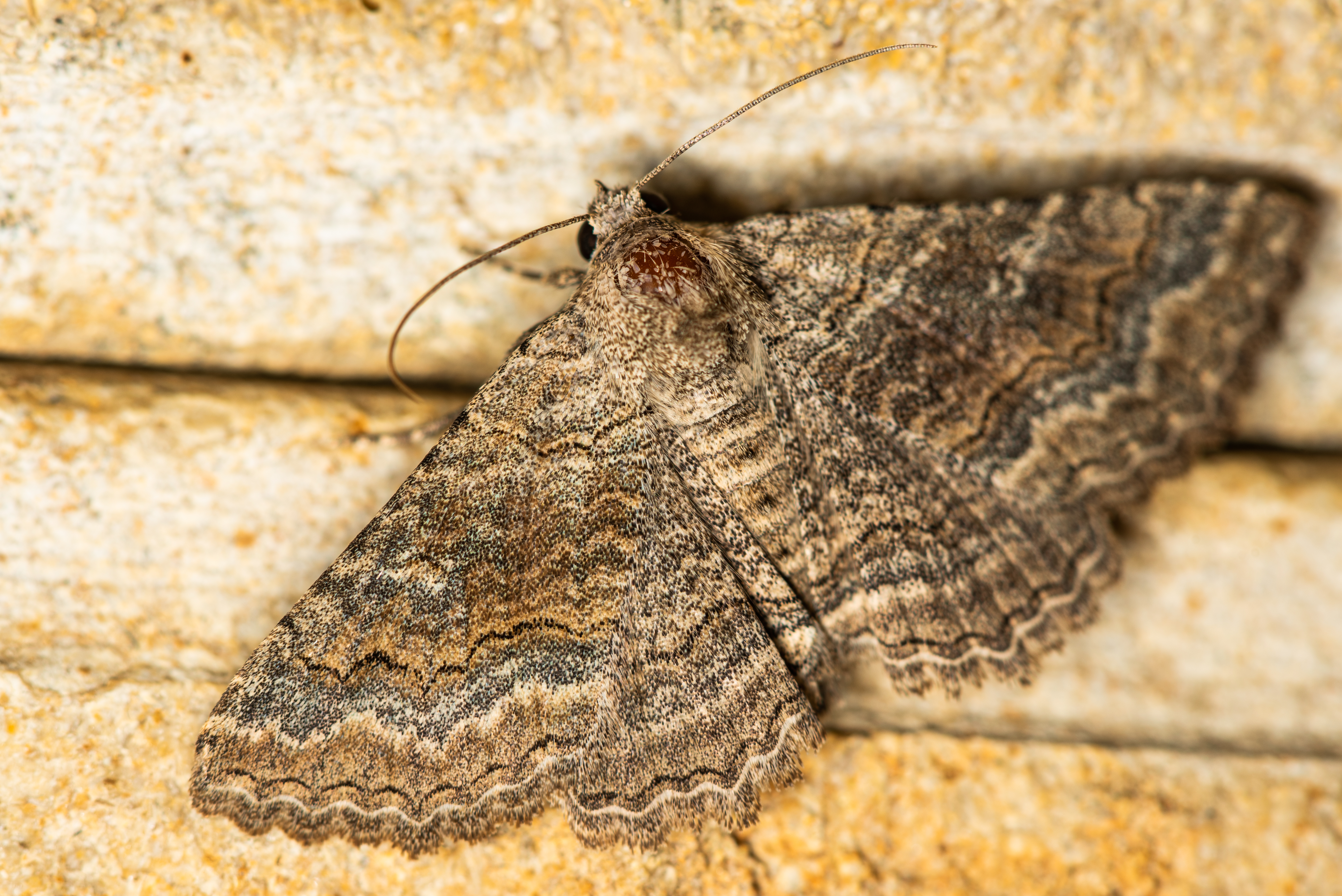

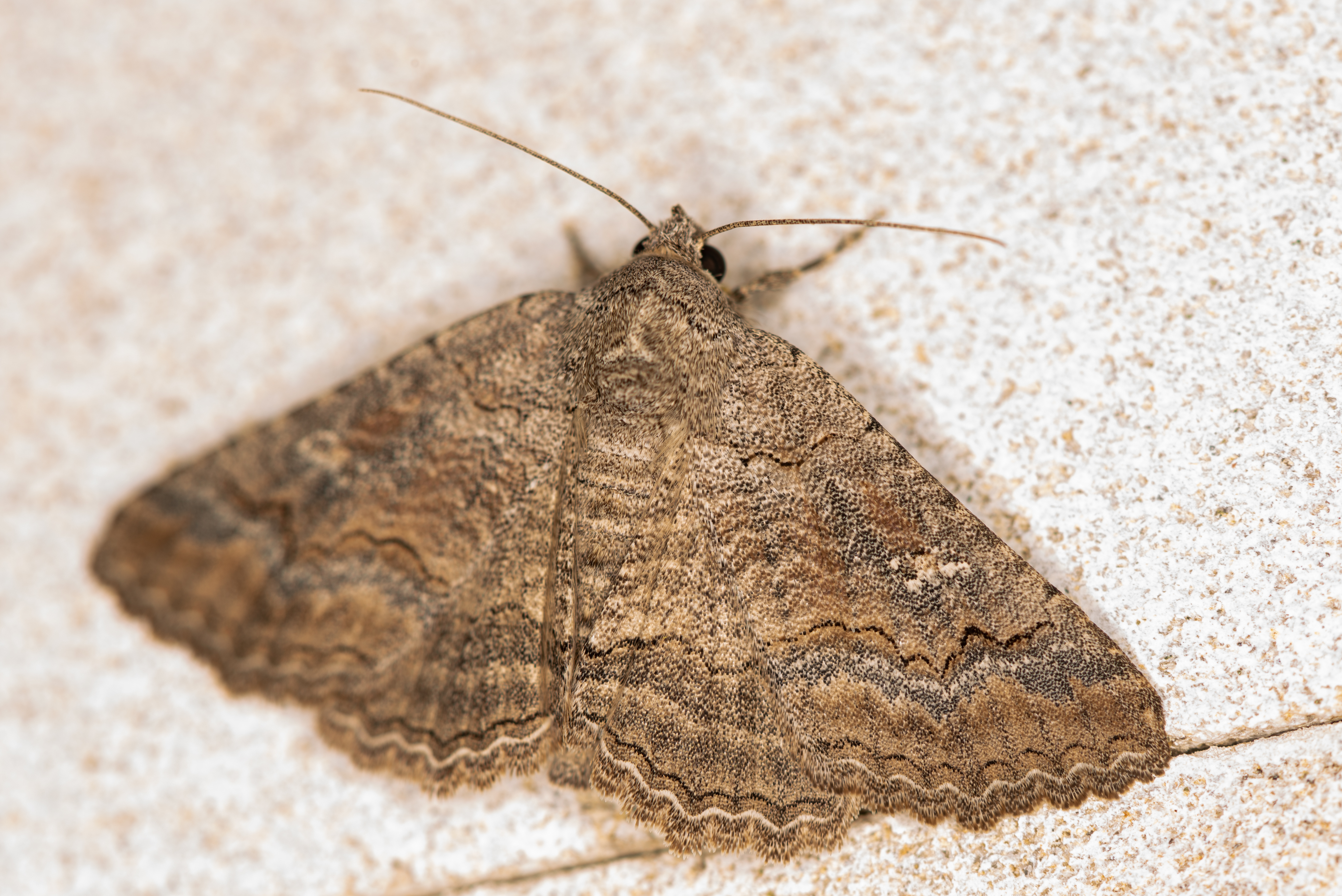
