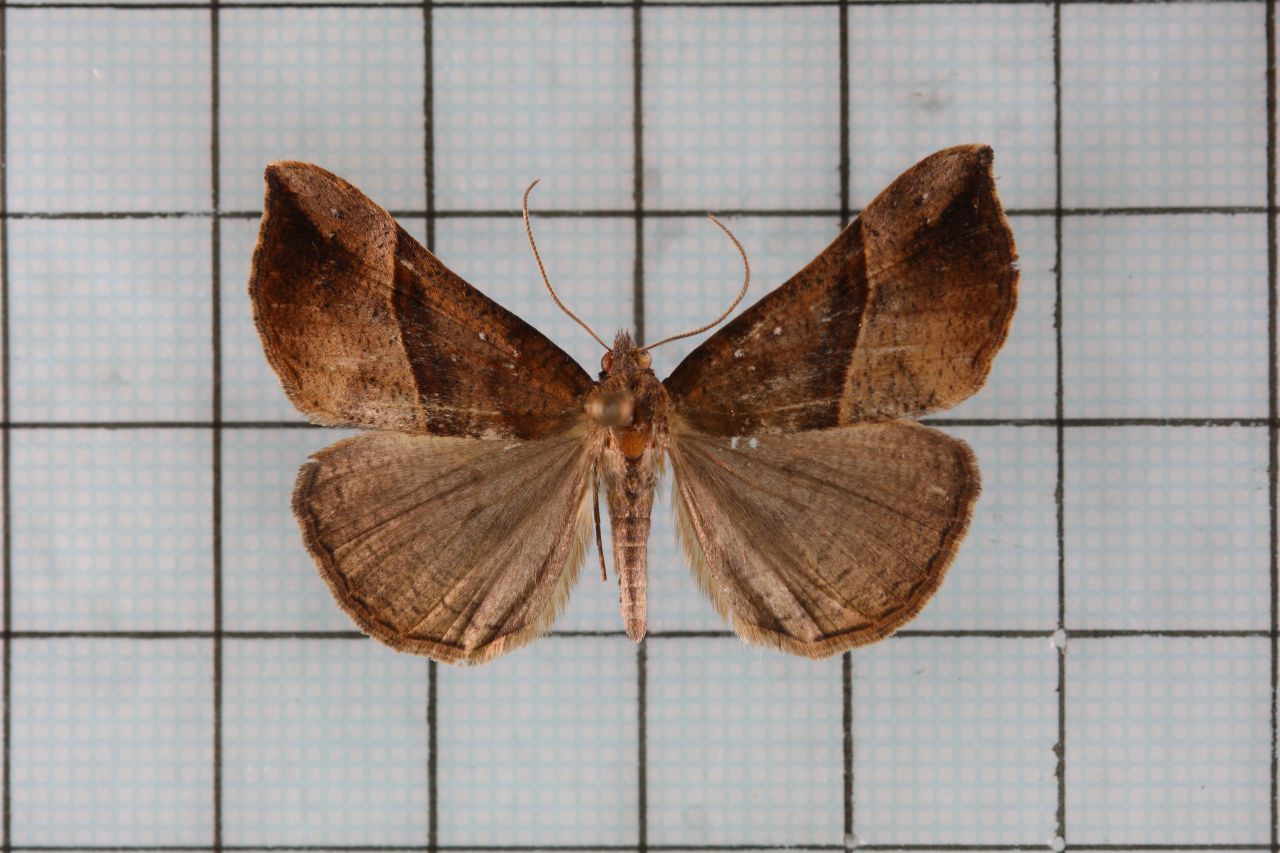
- Hypospila bolinoides

Scientific classification
- Kingdom: Animalia
- Phylum: Arthropoda
- Class: Insecta
- Order: Lepidoptera
- Superfamily: Noctuoidea
- Family: Erebidae
- Subfamily: Erebinae
- Tribe: Acantholipini
- Genus: Hypospila; Guenée in Boisduval & Guenée, 1852

Synonyms
- Orrea Walker, 1866; Moepa Walker 1865 (preocc. Moepa Walker, 1865)

= Hypospila =

Genus of moths

Hypospila is a genus of moths in the family Erebidae. The genus was erected by Achille Guenée in 1852.

== Species ==
- Hypospila bolinoides Guenée, 1852
- Hypospila brunnescens (Roepke, 1938)
- Hypospila contortalis (Mabille, 1880)
- Hypospila dochmotoma Turner, 1939
- Hypospila elongata Holloway, 1979
- Hypospila infimoides Moschler, 1880
- Hypospila iridicolor Pagenstecher, 1884
- Hypospila laurentensis Viette, 1966
- Hypospila ochracea Holloway, 1979
- Hypospila pseudobolinoides Holloway, 1979
- Hypospila similis Tams, 1935
- Hypospila tamsi Viette, 1951
- Hypospila thermesina Guenée, 1862
- Hypospila trimacula Saalmuller, 1891

== Former species ==
- Hypospila creberrima (Walker, 1858)
