= Pericyma squalens =

Scientific classification
- Kingdom: Animalia
- Phylum: Arthropoda
- Class: Insecta
- Order: Lepidoptera
- Superfamily: Noctuoidea
- Family: Erebidae
- Genus: Pericyma
- Species: P. squalens

Binomial name
- Pericyma squalens Lederer, 1855

Species of moth

Pericyma squalens is a moth of the family Noctuidae first described by Julius Lederer in 1855. It is found in south-eastern Turkey, Iran, Iraq, Afghanistan, Turkmenistan, Kuwait, Saudi Arabia, Egypt, Lebanon, Israel and Jordan.

There are multiple generations per year. Adults are on wing from March to August.

The larvae possibly feed on Alhagi species.
