= Alhagi graecorum =

Scientific classification
- Kingdom: Plantae
- Clade: Tracheophytes
- Clade: Angiosperms
- Clade: Eudicots
- Clade: Rosids
- Order: Fabales
- Family: Fabaceae
- Subfamily: Faboideae
- Genus: Alhagi
- Species: A. graecorum

Binomial name
- Alhagi graecorum Boise.

Synonyms
- Alhagi mannifera Alhagi tournefortii

Species of legume

Alhagi graecorum is a species of legume commonly known as mannatree or manna tree. Previously it was considered a subspecies of Alhagi maurorum. Drought-tolerant, it is found in the eastern Mediterranean and the Middle East.
