= Hypospila thermesina =

Scientific classification
- Kingdom: Animalia
- Phylum: Arthropoda
- Class: Insecta
- Order: Lepidoptera
- Superfamily: Noctuoidea
- Family: Erebidae
- Genus: Hypospila
- Species: H. thermesina

Binomial name
- Hypospila thermesina Guenée, 1862

Species of moth

Hypospila thermesina is a species of moth of the family Erebidae. It is found in the Indian Ocean on the Seychelles and La Réunion.

This species has a wingspan of 37mm.
