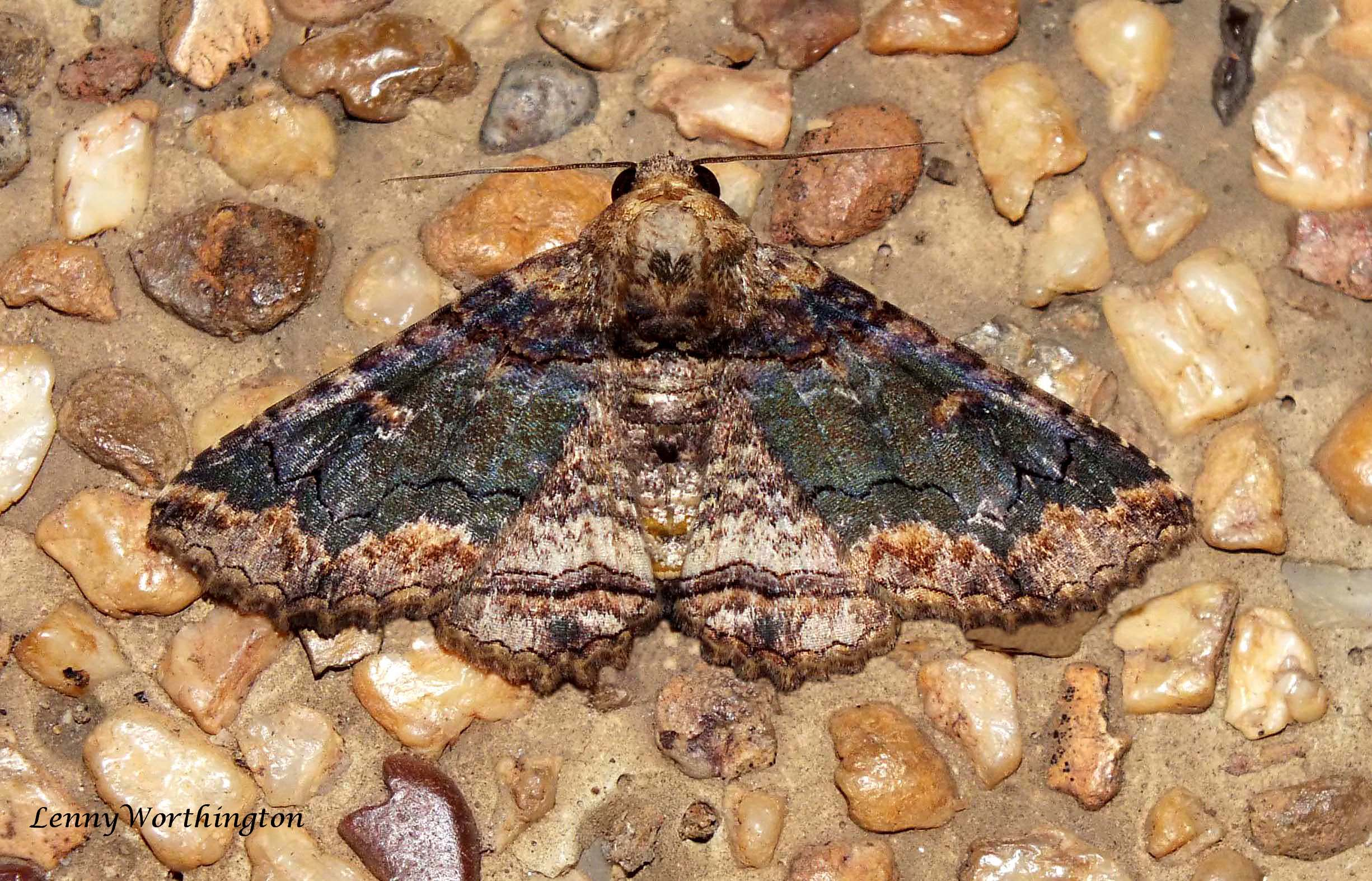
- Adult
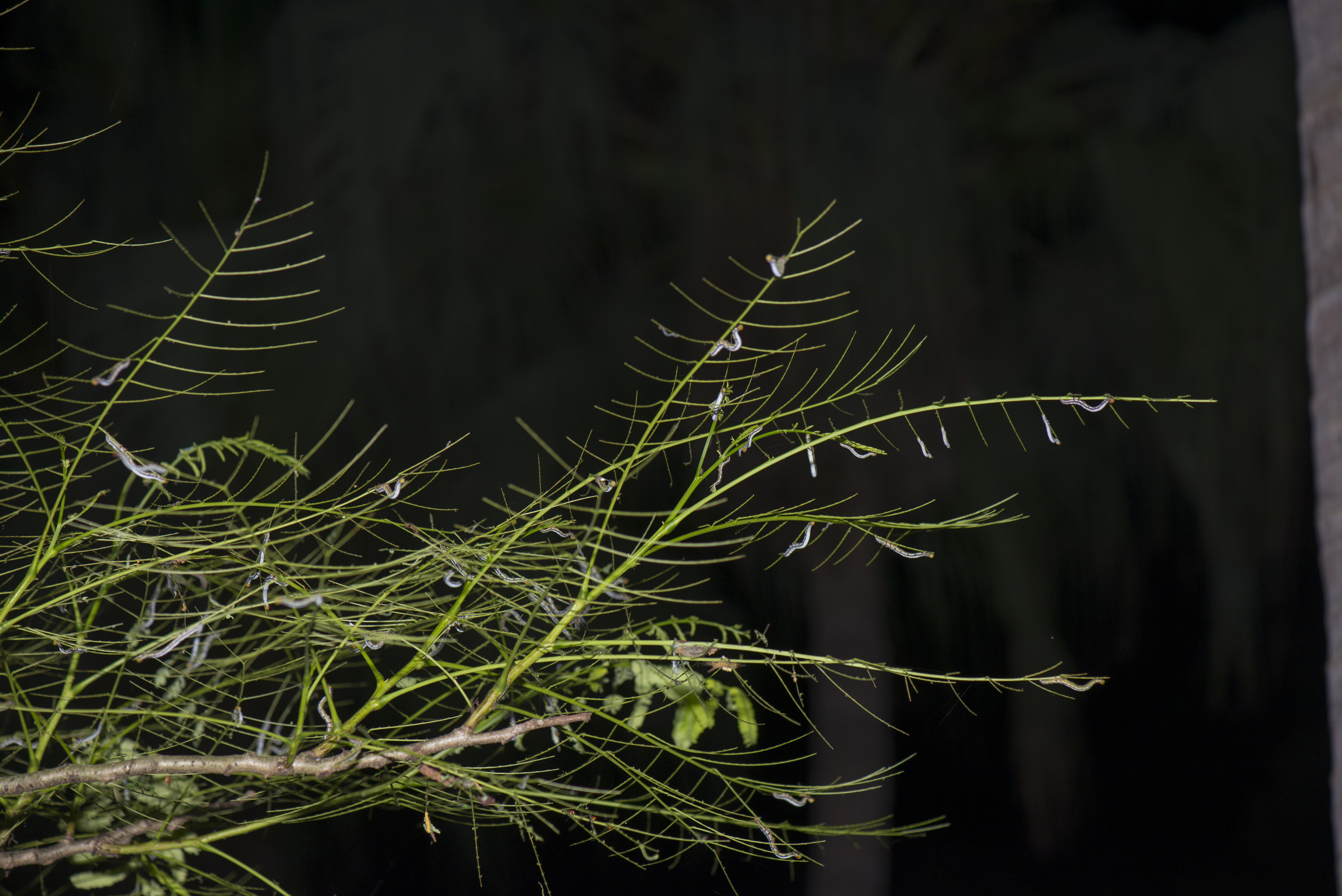
- Larvae

Scientific classification
- Kingdom: Animalia
- Phylum: Arthropoda
- Clade: Pancrustacea
- Class: Insecta
- Order: Lepidoptera
- Superfamily: Noctuoidea
- Family: Erebidae
- Genus: Pericyma
- Species: P. cruegeri

Binomial name
- Pericyma cruegeri (Butler, 1886)

Synonyms
- Homoptera cruegeri Butler, 1886

= Pericyma cruegeri =

Poinciana looper

Species of moth

Pericyma cruegeri, the poinciana looper, is a moth of the family Erebidae. The species was first described by Arthur Gardiner Butler in 1886. It is found in south-east Asia, including Hong Kong, Taiwan, Vietnam, Thailand, Sumatra, Peninsular Malaysia, Borneo, the Philippines, and New Guinea, as well as in Australia, in Queensland and northern New South Wales. Furthermore, it is an introduced species in Hawaii and Guam, where it was first detected in 1971. In Japan, it was first detected in 1986 on Ishigaki Island, and expanded to Okinawa Island by 2000.

It’s wingspan is about 40mm.

The larvae feed on the foliage of Caesalpiniaceae species, including Peltophorum pterocarpum and Delonix regia, and can cause extensive damage.
