= Pericyma basalis =

Scientific classification
- Kingdom: Animalia
- Phylum: Arthropoda
- Clade: Pancrustacea
- Class: Insecta
- Order: Lepidoptera
- Superfamily: Noctuoidea
- Family: Erebidae
- Genus: Pericyma
- Species: P. basalis

Binomial name
- Pericyma basalis Saalmüller, 1891

Synonyms
- Ozopteryx basalis Saalmüller, 1891

Species of moth

Pericyma basalis is a moth of the family Noctuidae. It is found on Madagascar and Réunion.

The wingspan of this species is 30 mm.
