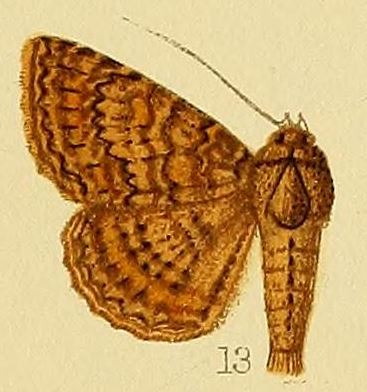
- Pericyma scandulata

Scientific classification
- Kingdom: Animalia
- Phylum: Arthropoda
- Class: Insecta
- Order: Lepidoptera
- Superfamily: Noctuoidea
- Family: Erebidae
- Genus: Pericyma
- Species: P. scandulata

Binomial name
- Pericyma scandulata (Felder & Rogenhofer 1874)

Synonyms
- Homoptera scandulata Felder & Rogenhofer 1874

= Pericyma scandulata =

Species of insect

Pericyma scandulata is a moth of the family Erebidae.

== Distribution ==
It is found in Uganda, Zimbabwe and South Africa.
