= Hypospila laurentensis =

Scientific classification
- Kingdom: Animalia
- Phylum: Arthropoda
- Class: Insecta
- Order: Lepidoptera
- Superfamily: Noctuoidea
- Family: Erebidae
- Genus: Hypospila
- Species: H. laurentensis

Binomial name
- Hypospila laurentensis Viette, 1966

Species of moth

Hypospila laurentensis is a species of moth in the family Erebidae. It is found in Madagascar.
