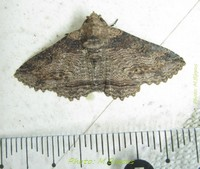

Scientific classification
- Kingdom: Animalia
- Phylum: Arthropoda
- Class: Insecta
- Order: Lepidoptera
- Superfamily: Noctuoidea
- Family: Erebidae
- Genus: Pericyma
- Species: P. mendax

Binomial name
- Pericyma mendax (Walker, 1858)

Synonyms
- Alamis mendax Walker, 1858; Dugaria cilipes Walker, 1858; Homoptera delineosa Walker, 1858; Homoptera disjuncta Walker, 1865

= Pericyma mendax =

Species of moth

Pericyma mendax is a moth of the family Erebidae. It is found most countries in subtropical Africa south of the Sahara, in Cape Verde, Mauritius, La Réunion and Madagascar.

It has a wingspan of approx. 40mm. Host plants of the larvae are Acacia mearnsii and Acacia sp. Fabaceae
