= Hypospila pseudobolinoides =

Scientific classification
- Kingdom: Animalia
- Phylum: Arthropoda
- Clade: Pancrustacea
- Class: Insecta
- Order: Lepidoptera
- Superfamily: Noctuoidea
- Family: Erebidae
- Genus: Hypospila
- Species: H. pseudobolinoides

Binomial name
- Hypospila pseudobolinoides Holloway, 1979

Species of moth

Hypospila pseudobolinoides is a species of moth in the family Erebidae. It is found on the Solomon Islands.
