= Hypospila contortalis =

Scientific classification
- Domain: Eukaryota
- Kingdom: Animalia
- Phylum: Arthropoda
- Class: Insecta
- Order: Lepidoptera
- Superfamily: Noctuoidea
- Family: Erebidae
- Genus: Hypospila
- Species: H. contortalis

Binomial name
- Hypospila contortalis (Mabille, 1880)

Synonyms
- Hypena contortalis Mabille, 1880

Species of moth

Hypospila contortalis is a species of moth in the family Erebidae. It is found in Madagascar.
