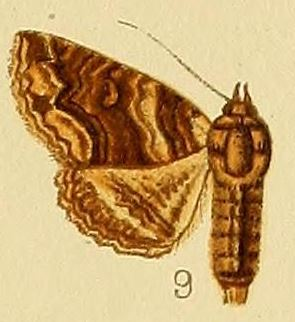

Scientific classification
- Kingdom: Animalia
- Phylum: Arthropoda
- Class: Insecta
- Order: Lepidoptera
- Superfamily: Noctuoidea
- Family: Erebidae
- Genus: Pericyma
- Species: P. atrifusa

Binomial name
- Pericyma atrifusa (Hampson, 1902)

Synonyms
- Homoptera atrifusa Hampson, 1902

= Pericyma atrifusa =

Species of moth

Pericyma atrifusa is a moth of the family Erebidae.

== Distribution ==
It is found in Botswana, Kenya and South Africa.

== Biology ==
The larvae feed on Fabaceae: Acacia senegal and Acacia tortilis.
