= Pericyma polygramma =

Scientific classification
- Kingdom: Animalia
- Phylum: Arthropoda
- Class: Insecta
- Order: Lepidoptera
- Superfamily: Noctuoidea
- Family: Erebidae
- Genus: Pericyma
- Species: P. polygramma

Binomial name
- Pericyma polygramma Hampson, 1913

Species of moth

Pericyma polygramma is a moth of the family Erebidae first described by George Hampson in 1913. It is found in subtropical Africa and is known from the Democratic Republic of the Congo, Nigeria, South Africa and Madagascar.

It has a wingspan of approx. 32–38 mm.
