= Hypospila trimacula =

Scientific classification
- Kingdom: Animalia
- Phylum: Arthropoda
- Clade: Pancrustacea
- Class: Insecta
- Order: Lepidoptera
- Superfamily: Noctuoidea
- Family: Erebidae
- Genus: Hypospila
- Species: H. trimacula

Binomial name
- Hypospila trimacula Saalmüller, 1891

Species of moth

Hypospila trimacula is a species of moth in the family Erebidae. It is found in Madagascar.
