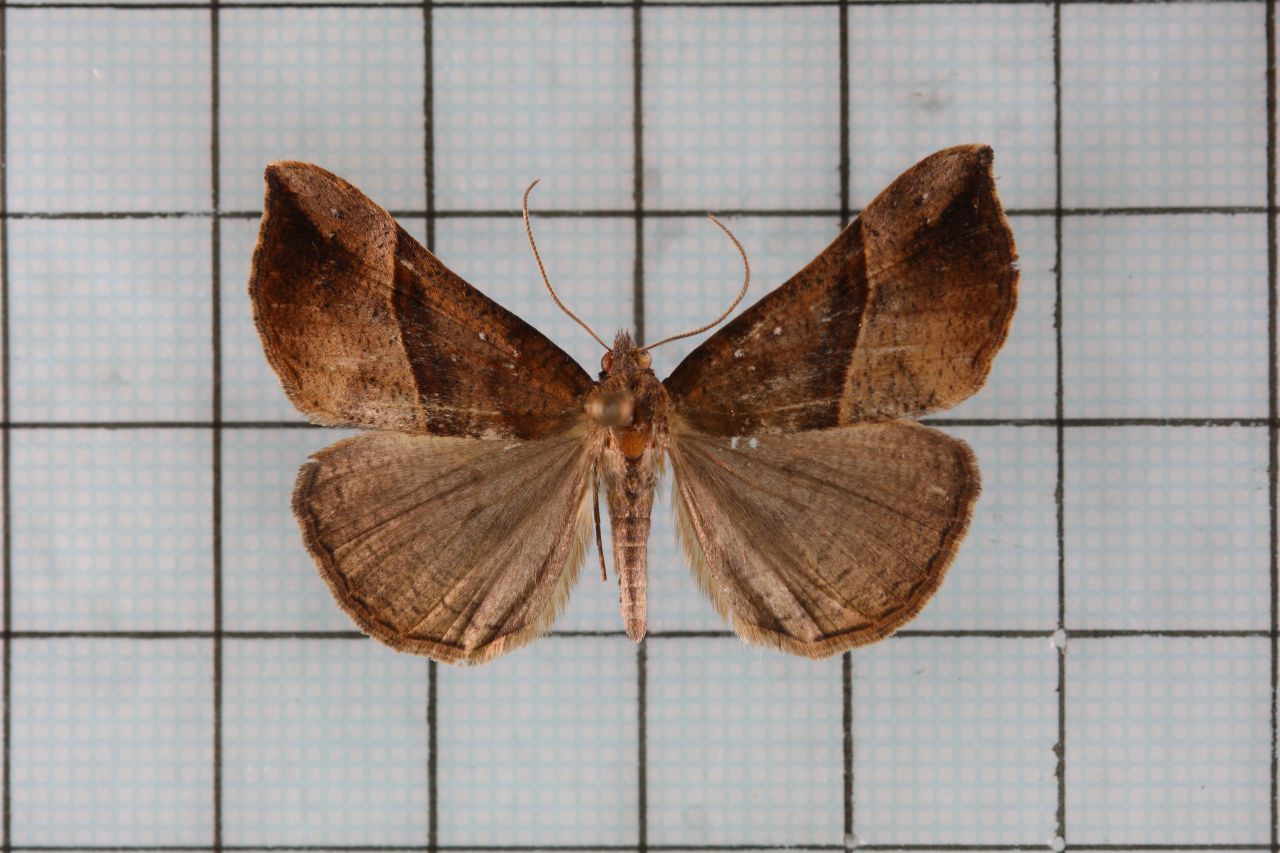

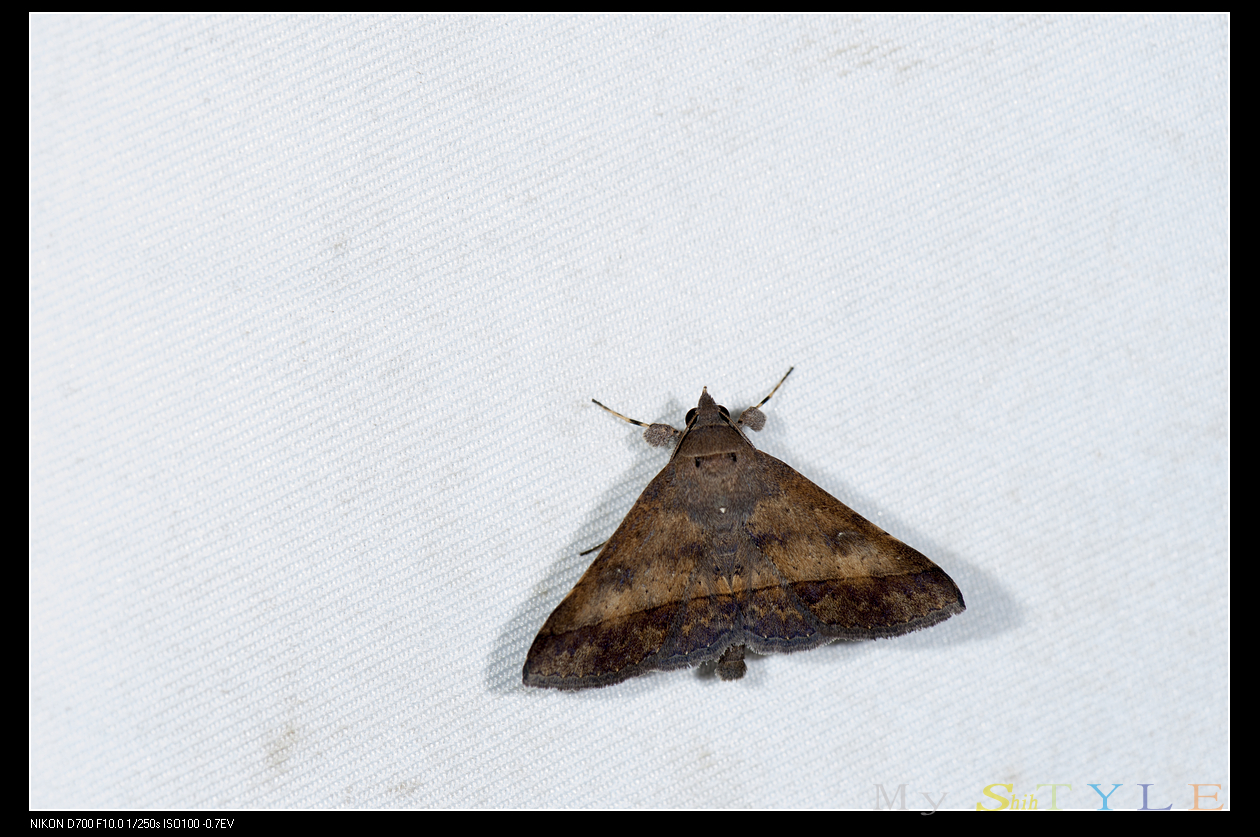

Scientific classification
- Kingdom: Animalia
- Phylum: Arthropoda
- Class: Insecta
- Order: Lepidoptera
- Superfamily: Noctuoidea
- Family: Erebidae
- Genus: Hypospila
- Species: H. bolinoides

Binomial name
- Hypospila bolinoides Guenée, 1852

Synonyms
- Thermesia signipalpis Walker, 1858; Hypospila thermesina Guenée, 1863 (disputed); Moepa concisa Walker, 1865; Thermesia orientalis Leech, 1900; Hypospila andamana Swinhoe, 1919

= Hypospila bolinoides =

Species of moth

Hypospila bolinoides is a species of moth in the family Erebidae first described by Achille Guenée in 1852. The species is found from the Indo-Australian tropics of India, Sri Lanka, Myanmar, Andaman Islands, China north to Japan and east to New Guinea, Queensland and the Carolines.

== Description ==
The wingspan is 36–44 mm. Male with ciliated antennae. Cell of hindwings short. Veins 7 and 8 distorted and vein 6 given off below angle of cell. Body much darker red-brown. Palpi black with white tips. Forewings with reniform reduced to a pale speck. The postmedial line less oblique, arising from the costa before apex, and not angled. Hindwings with straight postmedial line.

The larvae feed on the young leaves of Derris species. When disturbed they drop to the ground or jump off their leaf.
