= Hypospila brunnescens =

Scientific classification
- Domain: Eukaryota
- Kingdom: Animalia
- Phylum: Arthropoda
- Class: Insecta
- Order: Lepidoptera
- Superfamily: Noctuoidea
- Family: Erebidae
- Genus: Hypospila
- Species: H. brunnescens

Binomial name
- Hypospila brunnescens (Roepke, 1938)

Synonyms
- Plecoptera brunnescens Roepke 1938; Plecoptera brunnescens javanica Roepke 1938

Species of moth

Hypospila brunnescens is a species of moth in the family Erebidae. It is found in Indonesia (Sulawesi, Java).

== Subspecies ==
- Hypospila brunnescens brunnescens (Sulawesi)
- Hypospila brunnescens javanica Roepke 1938 (Java)
