= Hypospila tamsi =

Scientific classification
- Kingdom: Animalia
- Phylum: Arthropoda
- Class: Insecta
- Order: Lepidoptera
- Superfamily: Noctuoidea
- Family: Erebidae
- Genus: Hypospila
- Species: H. tamsi

Binomial name
- Hypospila tamsi Viette, 1951

Species of moth

Hypospila tamsi is a species of moth in the family Erebidae. It is found on the New Hebrides.
