= Hypospila infimoides =

Scientific classification
- Domain: Eukaryota
- Kingdom: Animalia
- Phylum: Arthropoda
- Class: Insecta
- Order: Lepidoptera
- Superfamily: Noctuoidea
- Family: Erebidae
- Genus: Hypospila
- Species: H. infimoides

Binomial name
- Hypospila infimoides Moschler, 1880

Species of moth

Hypospila infimoides is a species of moth in the family Erebidae. It is found in Suriname.
