= Hypospila dochmotoma =

Scientific classification
- Domain: Eukaryota
- Kingdom: Animalia
- Phylum: Arthropoda
- Class: Insecta
- Order: Lepidoptera
- Superfamily: Noctuoidea
- Family: Erebidae
- Genus: Hypospila
- Species: H. dochmotoma

Binomial name
- Hypospila dochmotoma (Turner, 1939)

Synonyms
- Ophyx dochmotoma Turner, 1939

Species of moth

Hypospila dochmotoma is a species of moth in the family Erebidae. It is found in Australia, where it has been recorded from Queensland.
