= Hypospila iridicolor =

Scientific classification
- Domain: Eukaryota
- Kingdom: Animalia
- Phylum: Arthropoda
- Class: Insecta
- Order: Lepidoptera
- Superfamily: Noctuoidea
- Family: Erebidae
- Genus: Hypospila
- Species: H. iridicolor

Binomial name
- Hypospila iridicolor Pagenstecher, 1884

Species of moth

Hypospila iridicolor is a species of moth in the family Erebidae. It's found in Indonesia (Ambon Island).
