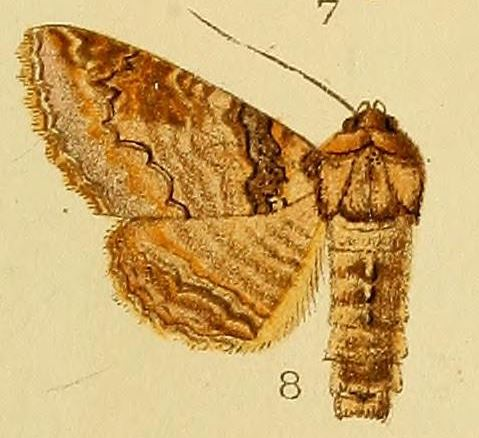
- Pericyma vinsonii

Scientific classification
- Kingdom: Animalia
- Phylum: Arthropoda
- Class: Insecta
- Order: Lepidoptera
- Superfamily: Noctuoidea
- Family: Erebidae
- Genus: Pericyma
- Species: P. vinsonii

Binomial name
- Pericyma vinsonii (Guenée, 1862)

Synonyms
- Homoptera vinsonii Guenée, 1862

= Pericyma vinsonii =

Species of moth

Pericyma vinsonii is a moth of the family Erebidae. It is found in Mauritius, La Réunion and Madagascar.

It has a wingspan of approx. 34 mm for the males and 41 mm for the females. Their larvae are commonly found on Delonix regia, a Fabaceae but most probably they are polyphage, as the adults can also be found up to altitudes of 1000m were this plant isn't found.
