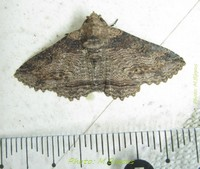

Scientific classification
- Domain: Eukaryota
- Kingdom: Animalia
- Phylum: Arthropoda
- Class: Insecta
- Order: Lepidoptera
- Superfamily: Noctuoidea
- Family: Erebidae
- Tribe: Pericymini
- Genus: Pericyma; Herrich-Schäffer, 1851

Synonyms
- Alamis Guenée, 1852; Dugaria Walker, [1858]; Moepa Walker, 1865; Ozopteryx Saalmüller, 1891

= Pericyma =

Genus of moths

Pericyma is a genus of moths in the family Erebidae. The genus was erected by Gottlieb August Wilhelm Herrich-Schäffer in 1851.

== Species ==
- Pericyma albidens (Walker, 1865) southern India
- Pericyma albidentaria (Freyer, 1842) Greece, Saudi Arabia, Iran, Kasakhstan, from (Asia Minor, Middle East) - Afghanistan, Turkestan
- Pericyma andrefana (Viette, 1988) Madagascar
- Pericyma atrifusa (Hampson, 1902) Burkina Faso, Togo, Nigeria, Arabia, Sudan, Somalia, Kenya, Tanzania, Mozambique, Botswana, Zambia, Zimbabwe, Eswatini, South Africa, Namibia
- Pericyma basalis (Saalmüller, 1891) Madagascar, Reunion
- Pericyma caffraria (Möschler, 1884) South Africa
- Pericyma cruegeri (Butler, 1886) Hong Kong, Taiwan, Vietnam, Thailand, Sumatra, Peninsular Malaysia, Borneo, Philippines, New Guinea, Queensland
- Pericyma deducta (Walker, [1858]) South Africa
- Pericyma detersa (Walker, 1865) northern India, Pakistan
- Pericyma glaucinans (Guenée, 1852) Saudi Arabia, India (Silhet, Punjab), Myanmar, Thailand, Vietnam, Malaysia, Taiwan, Java, Philippines
- Pericyma griveaudi (Laporte, 1973)
- Pericyma madagascana Hacker, 2016 Madagascar
- Pericyma mauritanica Hacker & Hausmann, 2010 Mauritania, Ivory Coast, Burkina Faso
- Pericyma mendax (Walker, [1858]) Mauritania, Senegal, Gambia, Ghana, Burkina Faso, Nigeria, Congo, Zaire, Botswana, Saudi Arabia, Sudan, Somalia, Eritrea, Ethiopia, Uganda, Kenya, Malawi, Tanzania, Zambia, Zimbabwe, Mozambique, Eswatini, South Africa, Namibia, Madagascar, Mauritius
- Pericyma metaleuca Hampson, 1913 Arabia, Ethiopia, Somalia, Kenya, Tanzania
- Pericyma minyas (Fawcett, 1916) Ethiopia, Somalia, Kenya, Tanzania
- Pericyma polygramma Hampson, 1913
- Pericyma pratti (Kenrick, 1917) Madagascar
- Pericyma scandulata (Felder & Rogenhofer, 1874)
- Pericyma schreieri Hacker, 2016 Ethiopia, Somalia, Kenya, Tanzania
- Pericyma signata Brandt, 1939 Saudi Arabia, Iran, Afghanistan, Nepal
- Pericyma squalens Lederer, 1855 Turkey, Arabia, Libya, Egypt, Iran, Iraq, Jordan, Palestine, Tajikistan
- Pericyma subbasalis Hacker, 2016 Taiwan
- Pericyma subtusplaga Berio, 1984 Kenya
- Pericyma umbrina (Guenée, 1852) India, Kenya, Somalia, Namibia, South Africa
- Pericyma viettei (Berio, 1955) Madagascar
- Pericyma vinsonii (Guenée, 1862) Madagascar, Mauritius, Reunion
