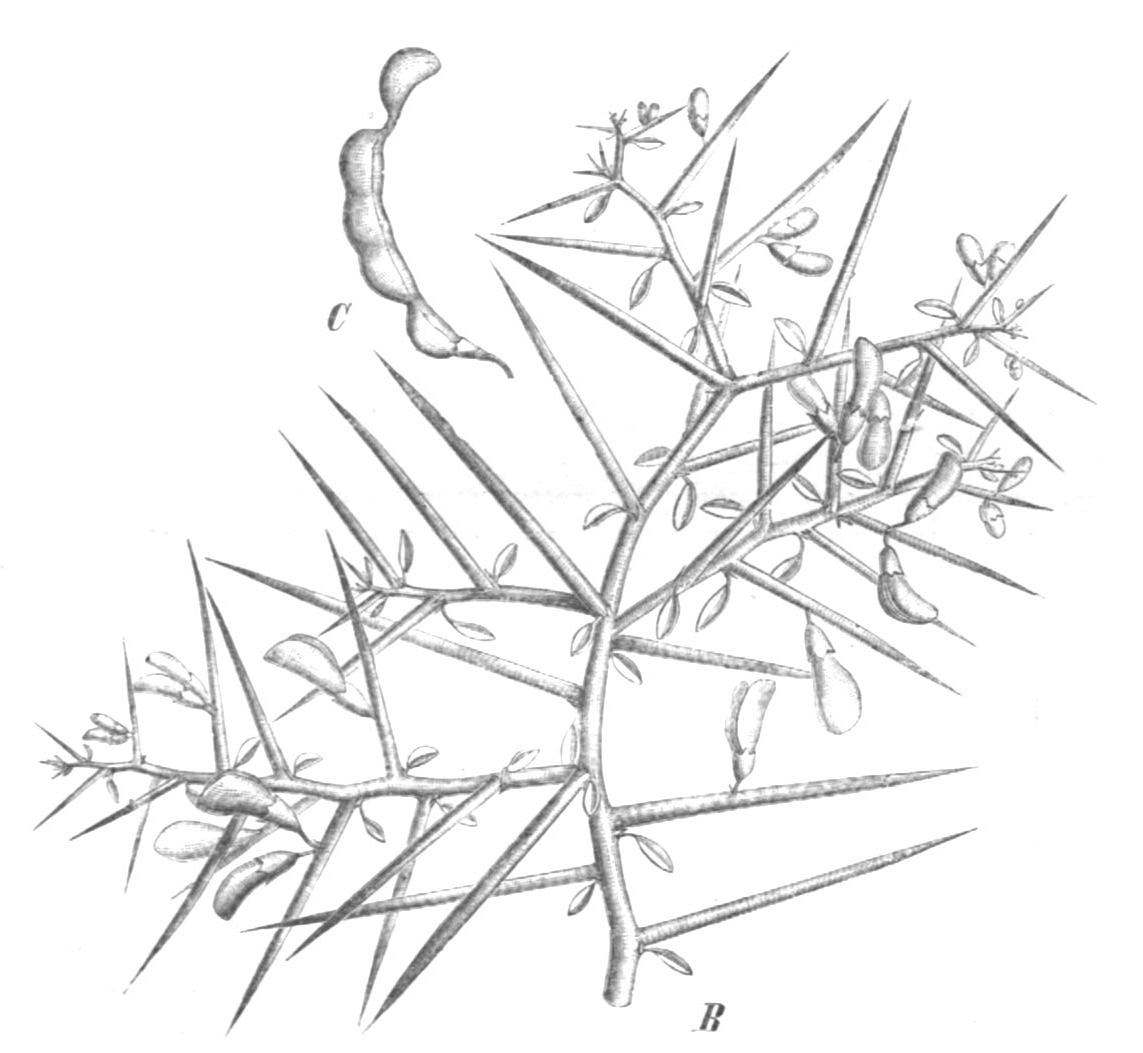
- Alhagi maurorum

Scientific classification
- Kingdom: Plantae
- Clade: Tracheophytes
- Clade: Angiosperms
- Clade: Eudicots
- Clade: Rosids
- Order: Fabales
- Family: Fabaceae
- Subfamily: Faboideae
- Tribe: Hedysareae
- Genus: Alhagi; Tourn. ex Gagnebin (1755)

Type species
- Alhagi maurorum Medik.

Species
- Alhagi brevispina Maire; Alhagi graecorum Boiss.; Alhagi maurorum Medik.; Alhagi pseudalhagi (M.Bieb.) Desv. ex Wangerin

Synonyms
- Manna D.Don (1825)

= Alhagi =

Genus of legumes

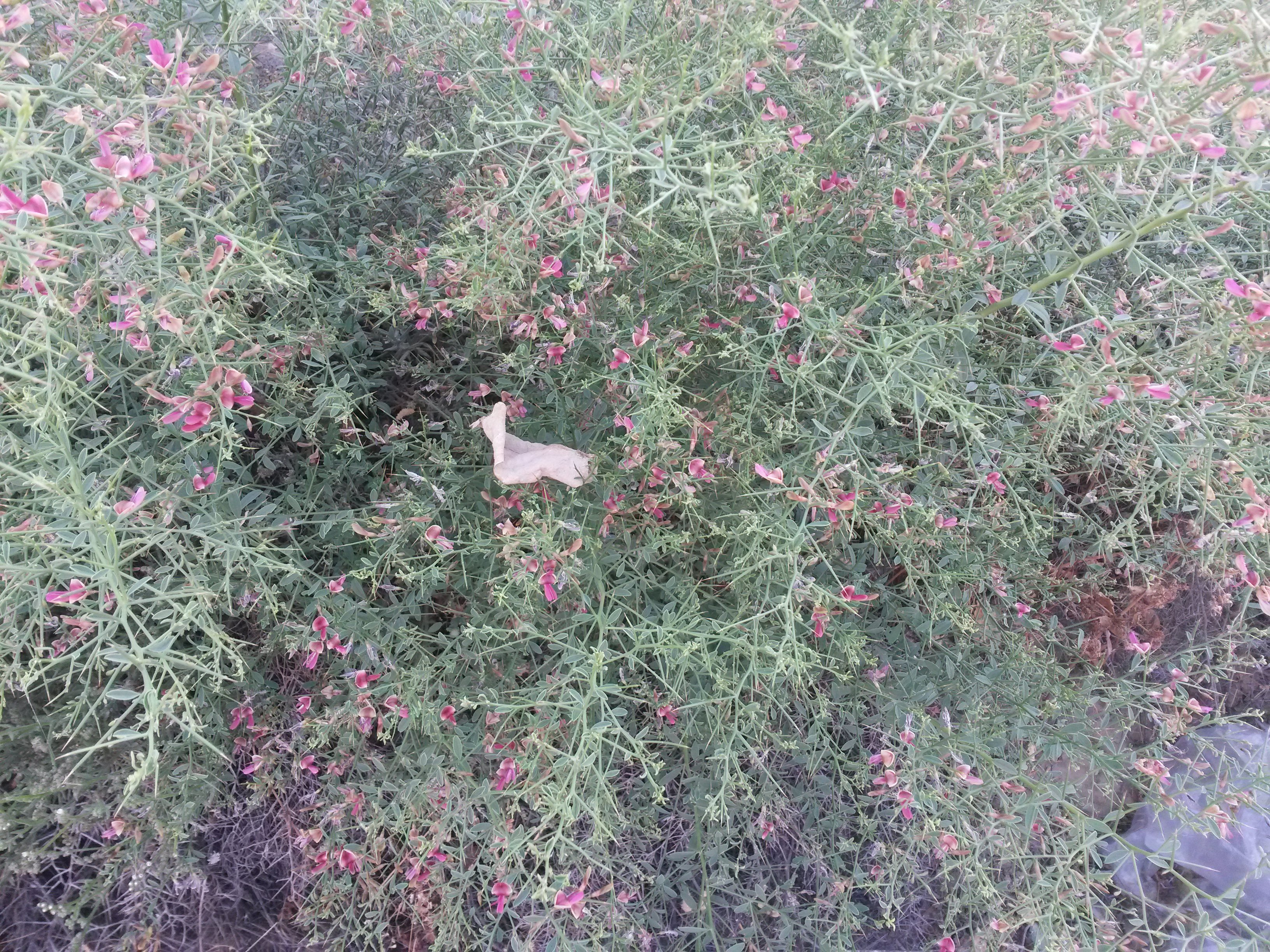
A big plant of Alhagi in Ab Pakhsh

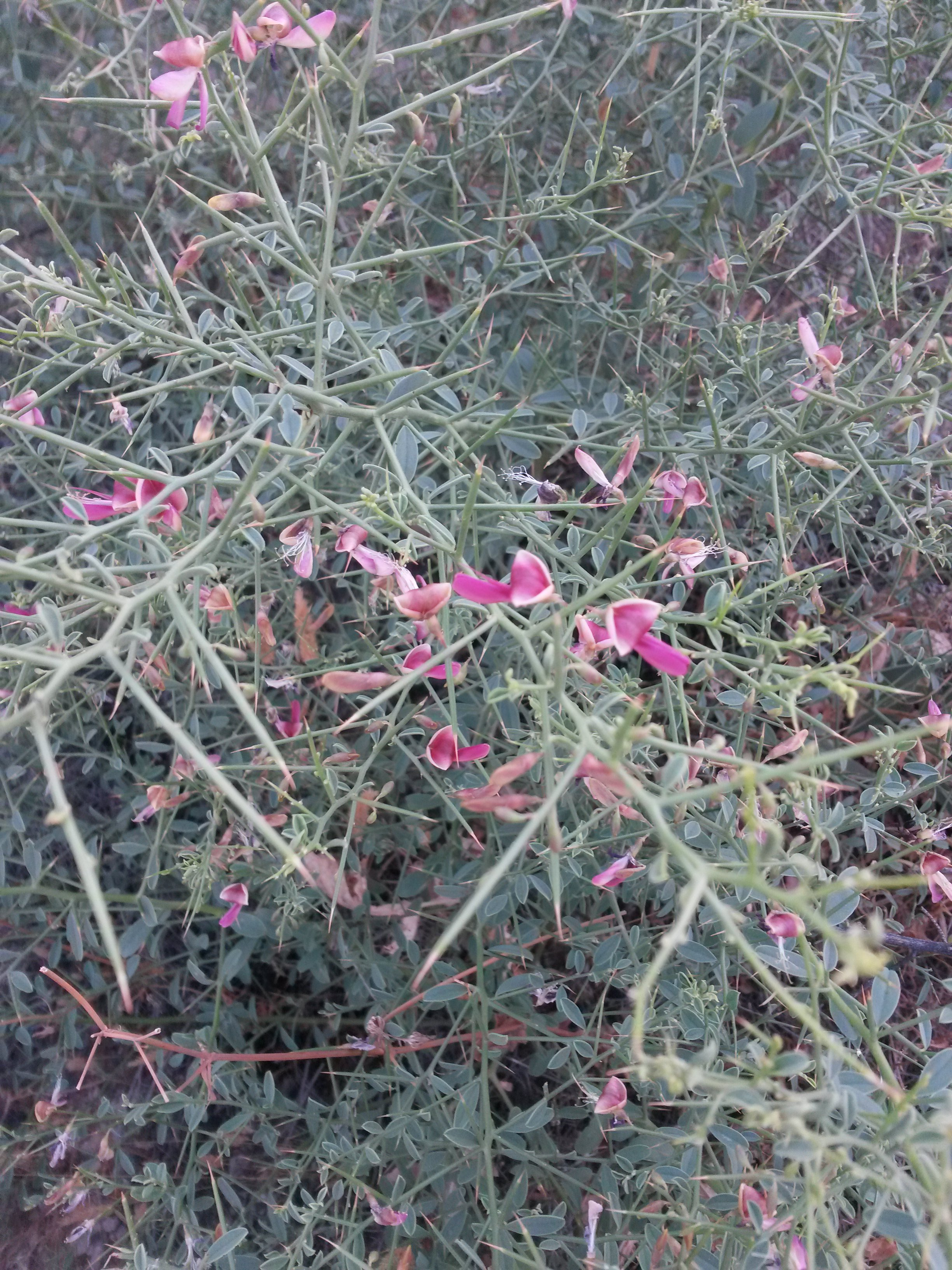
Alhagi flowers in Ab Pakhsh

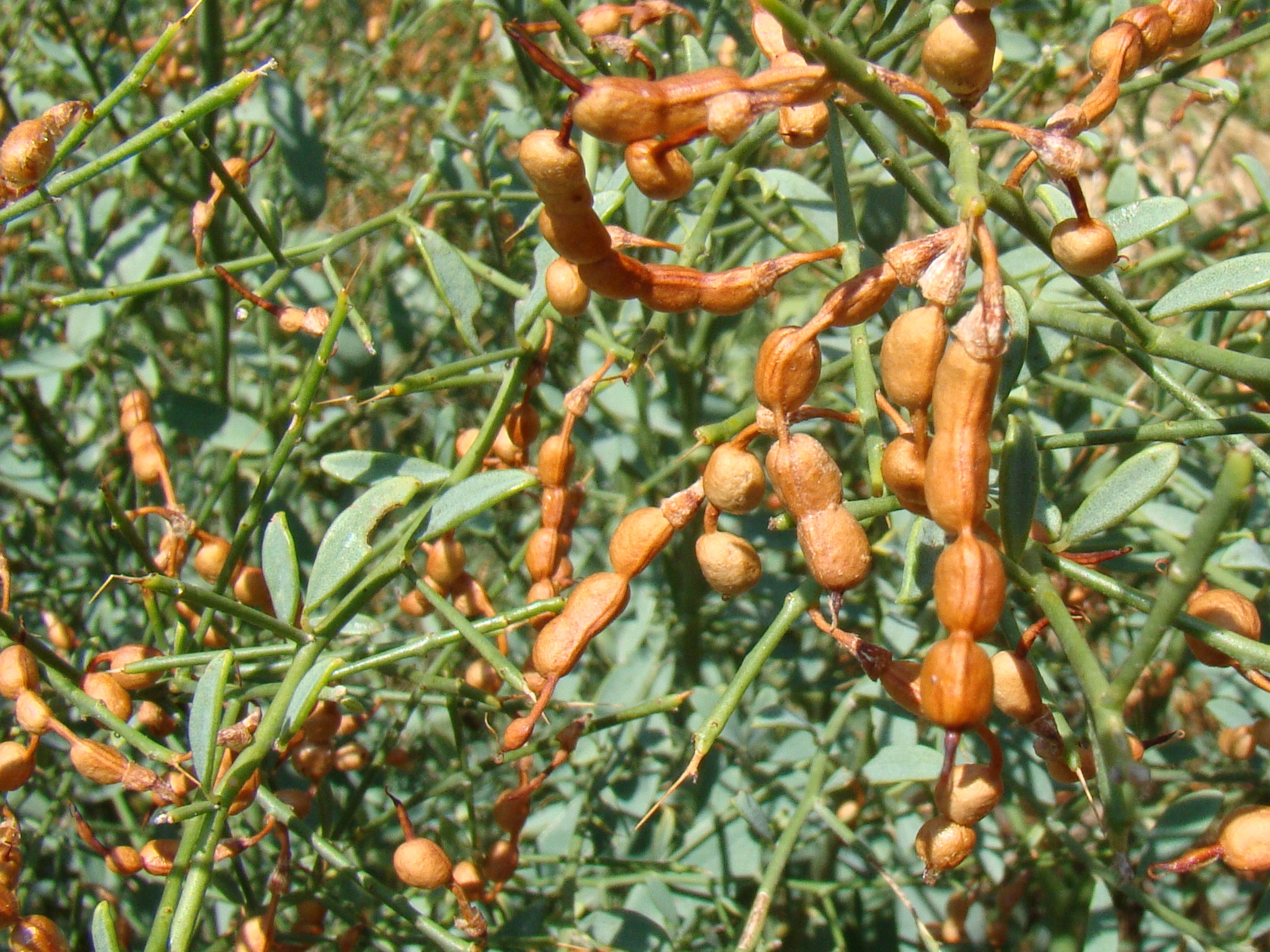
Alhagi

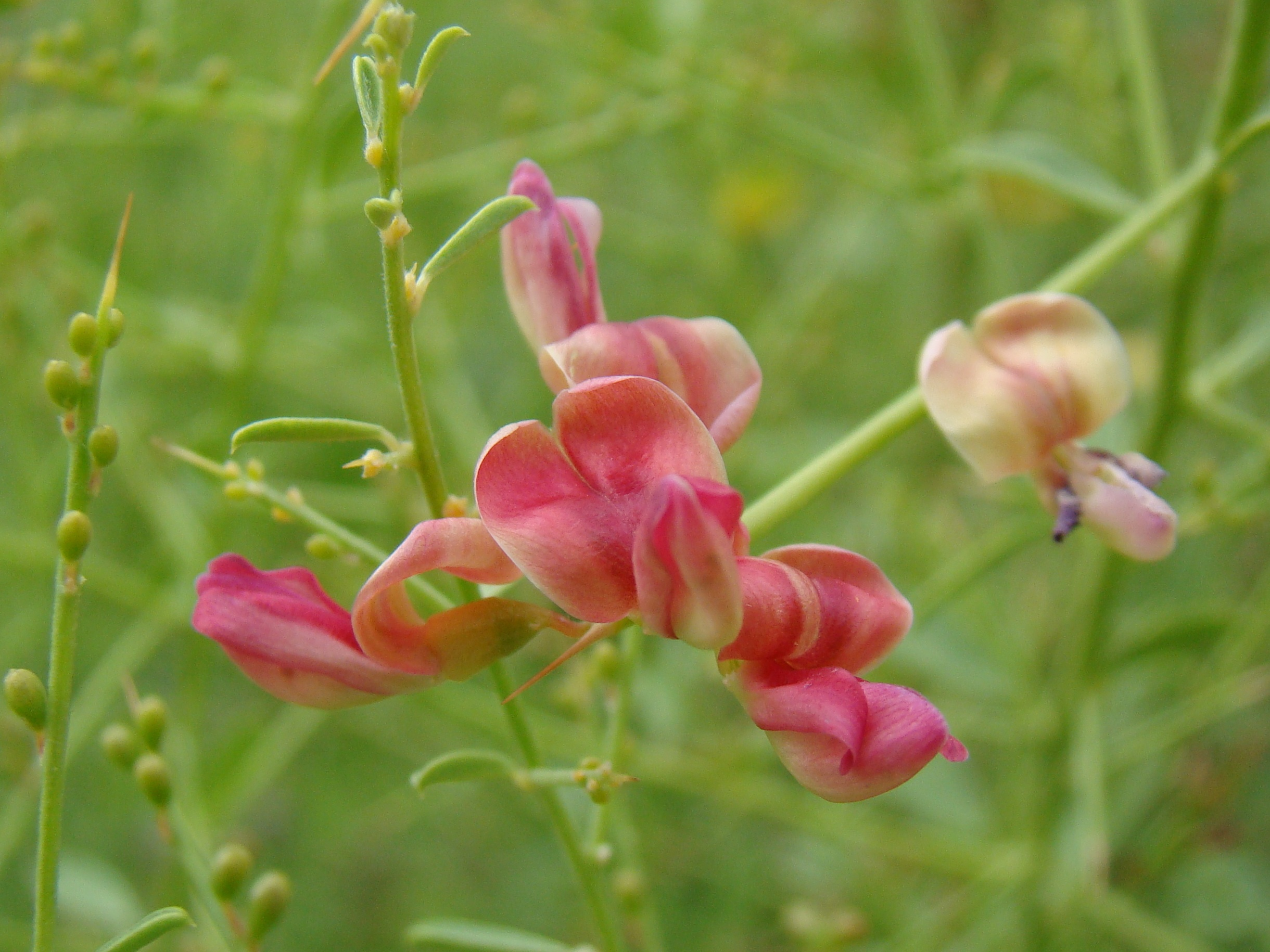
Alhagi flowers

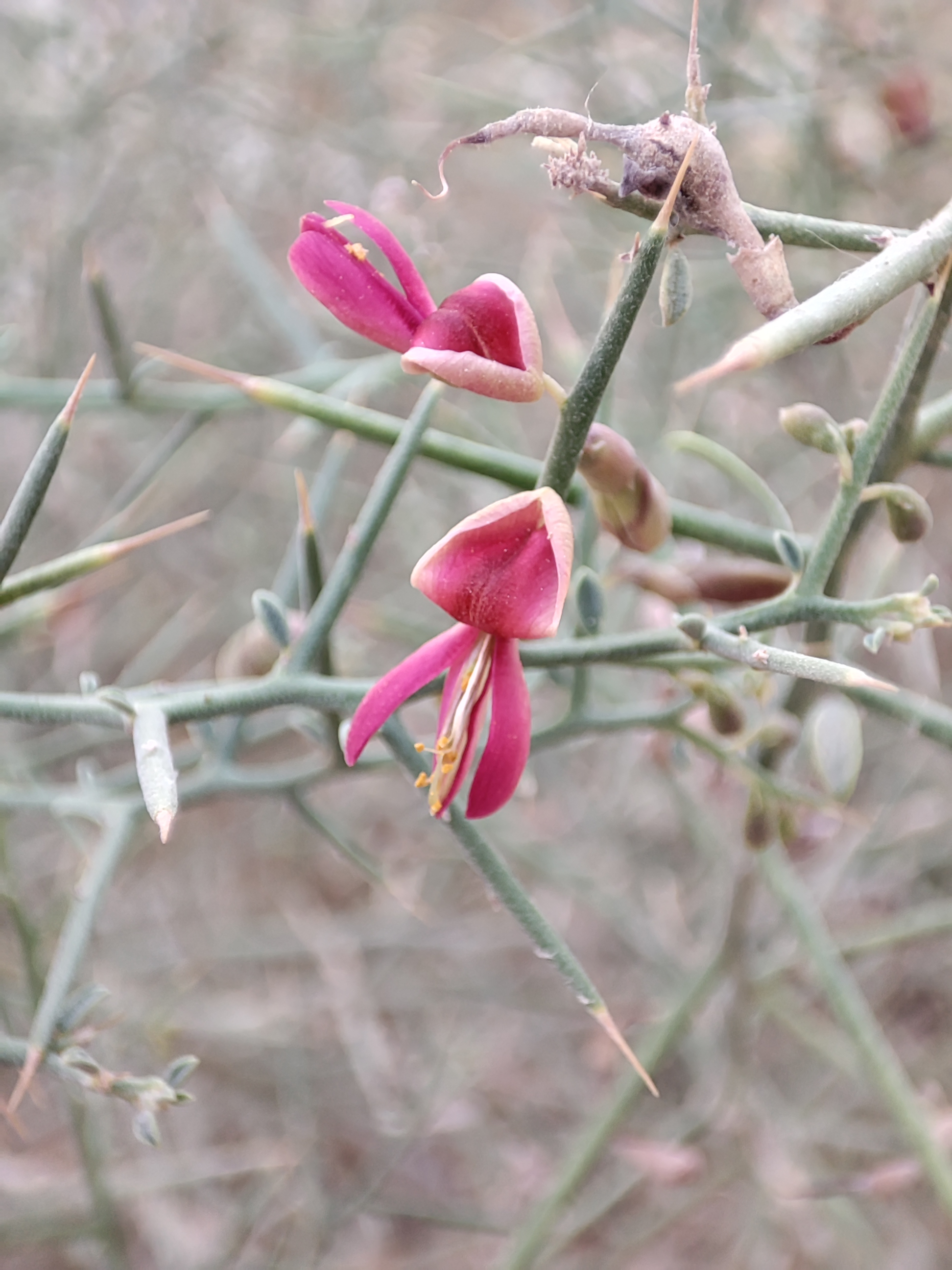
Wild Alhagi in Behbahan, Iran

Alhagi is a genus of Old World plants in the family Fabaceae. They are commonly called camelthorns or manna trees. There are four accepted species, which range from northern Africa and Greece through western and central Asia to India and northern China.

Alhagi species have proportionally the deepest root system of any plants - a 1 m (3 ft 3 in) high shrub may have a main root more than 15 m (49 ft) long; due to their deep root system Alhagi species are drought-avoiding plants that utilize ground water, adapting in that way perfectly to the hyper-arid environment.

Alhagi species are used as food plants by the larvae of some Lepidoptera species including Coleophora argyrella which feeds exclusively on A. maurorum.

The genus name comes from the Arabic word for pilgrim.

== Species ==
Four species are accepted:

- Alhagi brevispina Maire – Chad (Tibesti Mountains)
- Alhagi graecorum Boiss. – Greece, western Asia, Arabian Peninsula, and North Africa
- Alhagi maurorum Medik. – levant and the Caucasus to central Asia, India, and Xinjiang
- Alhagi pseudalhagi (M.Bieb.) Desv. ex Wangerin – North Africa and Greece through western and Central Asia to the western Himalayas and northern China

== Uses in traditional medicine ==
Alhagi in Persian is خارشُتُر (xâr-e šotor) which means "thistle of camels", as camels can eat it with its thorns. Its foliage is the habitat of a scale insect which produces Manna of hedysarum or Tarangabeen, which is used as a remedy for neonatal jaundice.
