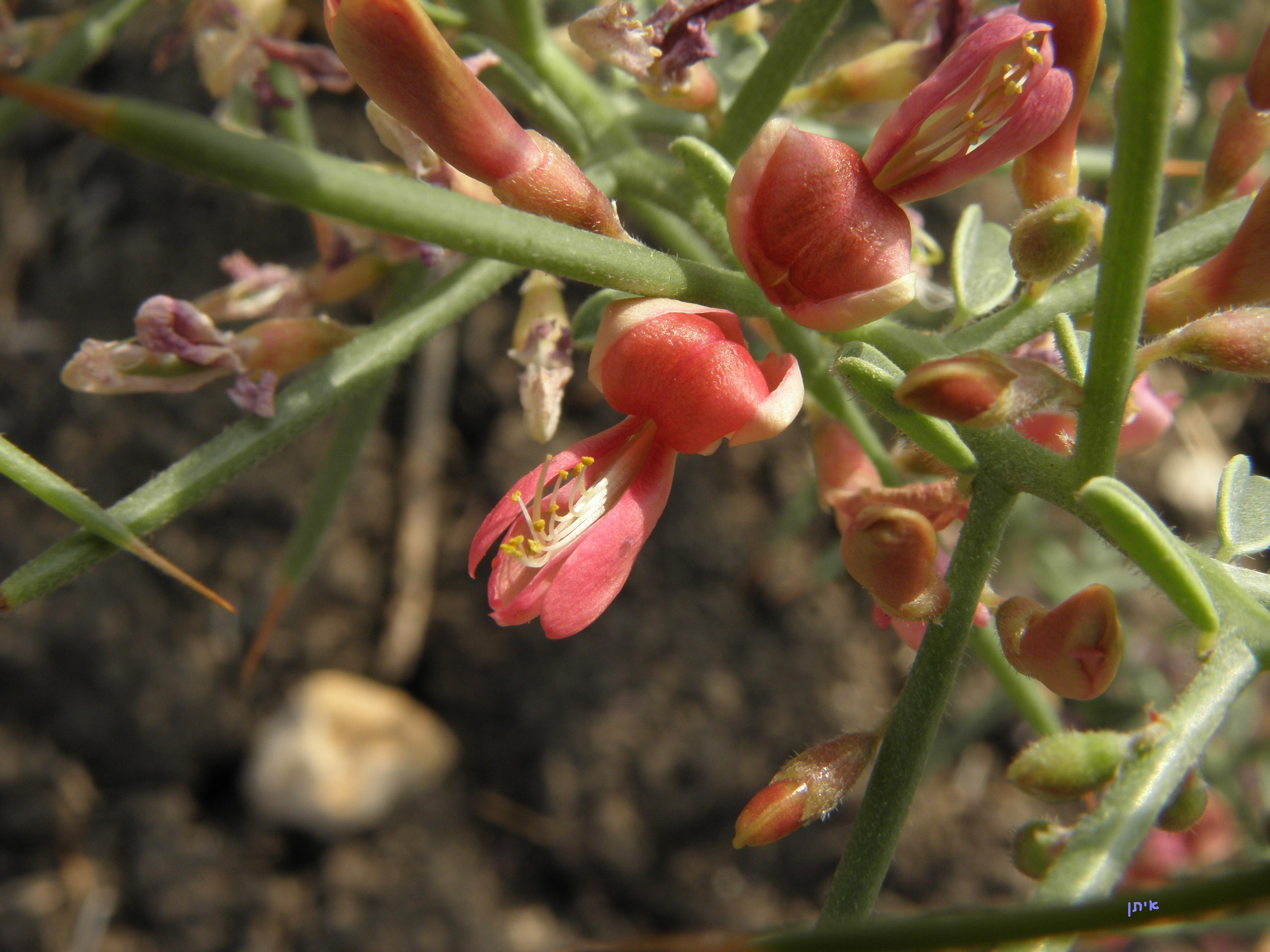
- Alhagi maurorum flowers

Scientific classification
- Kingdom: Plantae
- Clade: Tracheophytes
- Clade: Angiosperms
- Clade: Eudicots
- Clade: Rosids
- Order: Fabales
- Family: Fabaceae
- Subfamily: Faboideae
- Genus: Alhagi
- Species: A. maurorum

Binomial name
- Alhagi maurorum Medik.

Varieties
- Alhagi maurorum var. maurorum; Alhagi maurorum var. turcorum (Boiss.) Meilke

Synonyms
- List: Alhagi alhagi (L.) Huth (1893); Alhagi camelorum Fisch. (1812); Alhagi napaulensium DC. (1825); Alhagi turcorum Boiss. (1849); Genista juasi Buch.-Ham. ex D.Don 247 (1825); Hedysarum alhagi L. (1753); Hedysarum hamiltonii Spreng. (1826); Manna caspica D.Don (1825); Manna hebraica D.Don (1825); Ononis spinosa Hasselq. (1769)

= Alhagi maurorum =

Species of flowering plant in the pea family

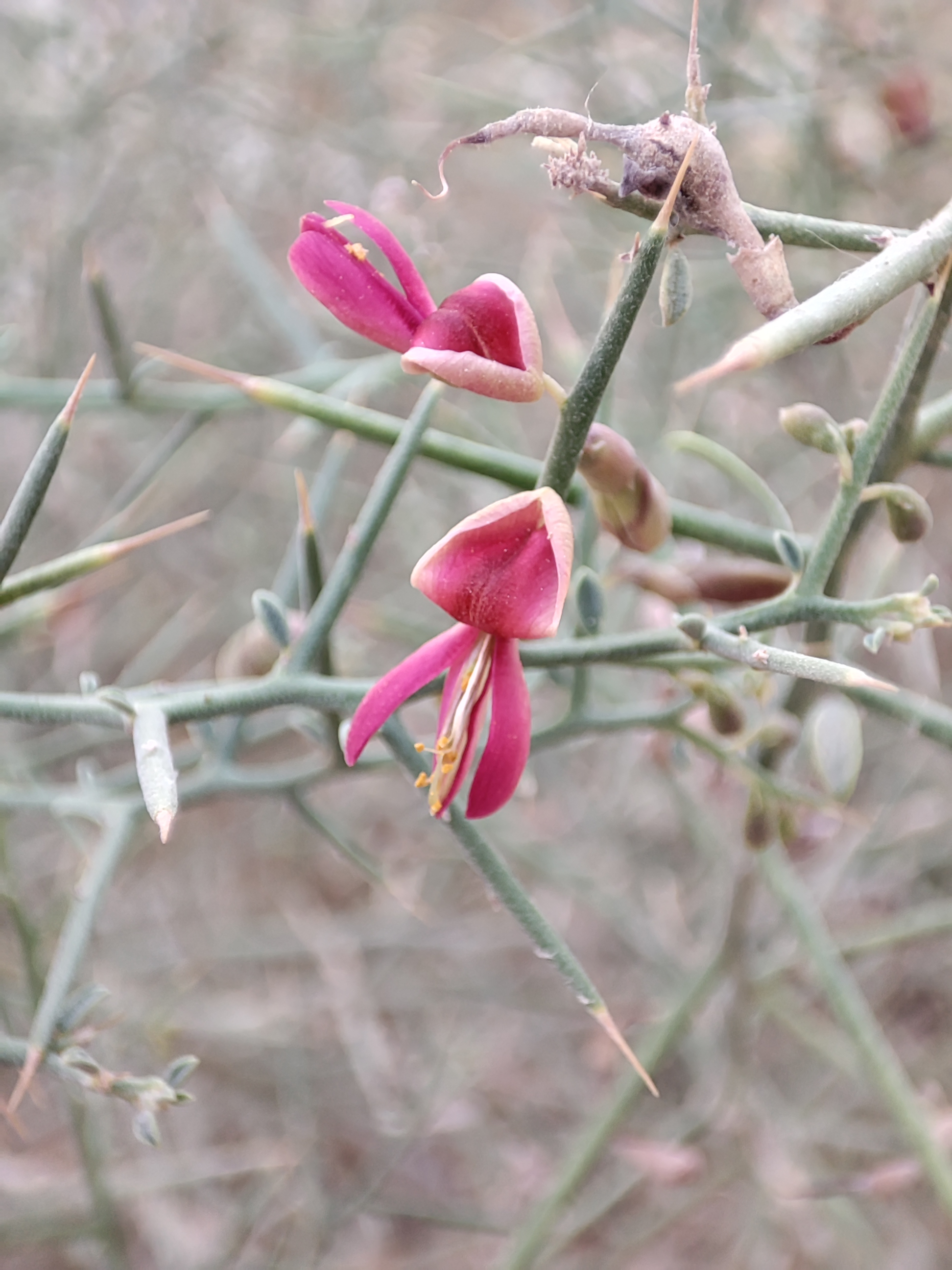
Alhagi maurorum in Behbahan, Iran

Alhagi maurorum is a species of legume commonly known, variously, as camelthorn, Caspian manna, and Persian mannaplant. This shrub is native to Eurasia, but has been introduced to many other areas of the world.

== Description ==
The perennial plant grows from a massive rhizome system which may extend over 1.8 metres (6 ft) into the ground. New shoots can appear over 6 m (20 ft) from the parent plant. Above the ground, the plant grows up to 0.9 metres (3 ft) tall. It is a heavily branched, gray-green thicket with long spines along the branches. The deciduous leaves are oval to egg-shaped, up to 1 centimetre (1/2 in) long.

It bears small, bright pink to maroon pea flowers up to 1 cm (3/8 in) long and small legume pods, which are brown or reddish, up to 2.5 cm (1 in), and constricted between the seeds. The seeds are mottled brown beans.

== Distribution and habitat ==
Alhagi maurorum is indigenous to temperate and tropical Eurasia and the Middle East, in: Afghanistan, Armenia, Azerbaijan, northwest China, Cyprus, northern India, Iran, Iraq, Israel, Jordan, Kazakhstan, Kuwait, Lebanon, Mongolia, Pakistan, Syria, Tajikistan, Turkey, Turkmenistan, Uzbekistan, and Russia (in Ciscaucasia, Dagestan, southern European Russia, and the southern part of the West Siberian Plain).

The species has become naturalized in Australia, the southwest United States, and southern Africa.

== Ecology ==
Alhagi maurorum is a noxious weed outside its native range. It is a contaminant of alfalfa seed, and grows readily when accidentally introduced to a cultivated field. It has a wide soil tolerance, thriving on saline, sandy, rocky, and dry soils. It does best when growing next to a source of water, such as an irrigation ditch. It is unpalatable to animals and irritating when it invades forage and grazing land.

== Uses ==
Alhagi maurorum has been used locally in folk medicine as a treatment for glandular tumors, nasal polyps, and ailments related to the bile ducts. It is used as a medicinal herb for its gastroprotective, diaphoretic, diuretic, expectorant, laxative, antidiarrhoeal and antiseptic properties, and in the treatment of rheumatism and hemorrhoids. The plant is mentioned in the Quran as a source of sweet manna. It has also been used as a sweetener.

In the folk medicine of Iran, A. maurorum decoction has been used for jaundice therapy.
