= Malickyella =

Scientific classification
- Kingdom: Animalia
- Phylum: Arthropoda
- Clade: Pancrustacea
- Class: Insecta
- Order: Lepidoptera
- Family: Crambidae
- Subfamily: Spilomelinae
- Genus: Malickyella; Mey & Speidel, 2010

Species
- see text

Genus of moth

Malickyella is a genus of snout moth in the species-rich subfamily Spilomelinae of the family Crambidae. The genus was described in 2010 by the German entomologists Wolfram Mey and Wolfgang Speidel based on material from South-East Asia. The four species of the genus are distributed in the lowland forests of the Indomalayan realm, stretching from the Indian state of Assam to the Philippines.

Although the larvae have not been described in detail, the larval food plant for at least one species is known: M. lobophoralis is feeding on Neobalanocarpus heimii, a hardwood tree species in the Dipterocarpaceae family.

The genus was named in honour of Prof. Dr. Hans Malicky, a renowned entomologist and specialist of caddisflies, on the occasion of his 75th birthday.

== Species ==
Malickyella currently comprises the following four species:

- Malickyella brunnea Mey & Speidel, 2010
- Malickyella iriusalis (Walker, 1859)
- Malickyella lobophoralis (Hampson, 1896) (type species)
- Malickyella tigridalis (Hampson, 1897)

== Systematics ==
The genus was created for the species of the Eoophyla lobophoralis species group, which was found to be misplaced in Eoophyla and in the Acentropinae subfamily altogether. The sister group of Malickyella is not known as of yet, but the species of Malickyella resemble the Musotiminae species Ambia albomaculalis and Musotima decoralis, which, however, might be misplaced in their respective genera.

The genus is also currently not placed in any of the Spilomelinae tribes.
