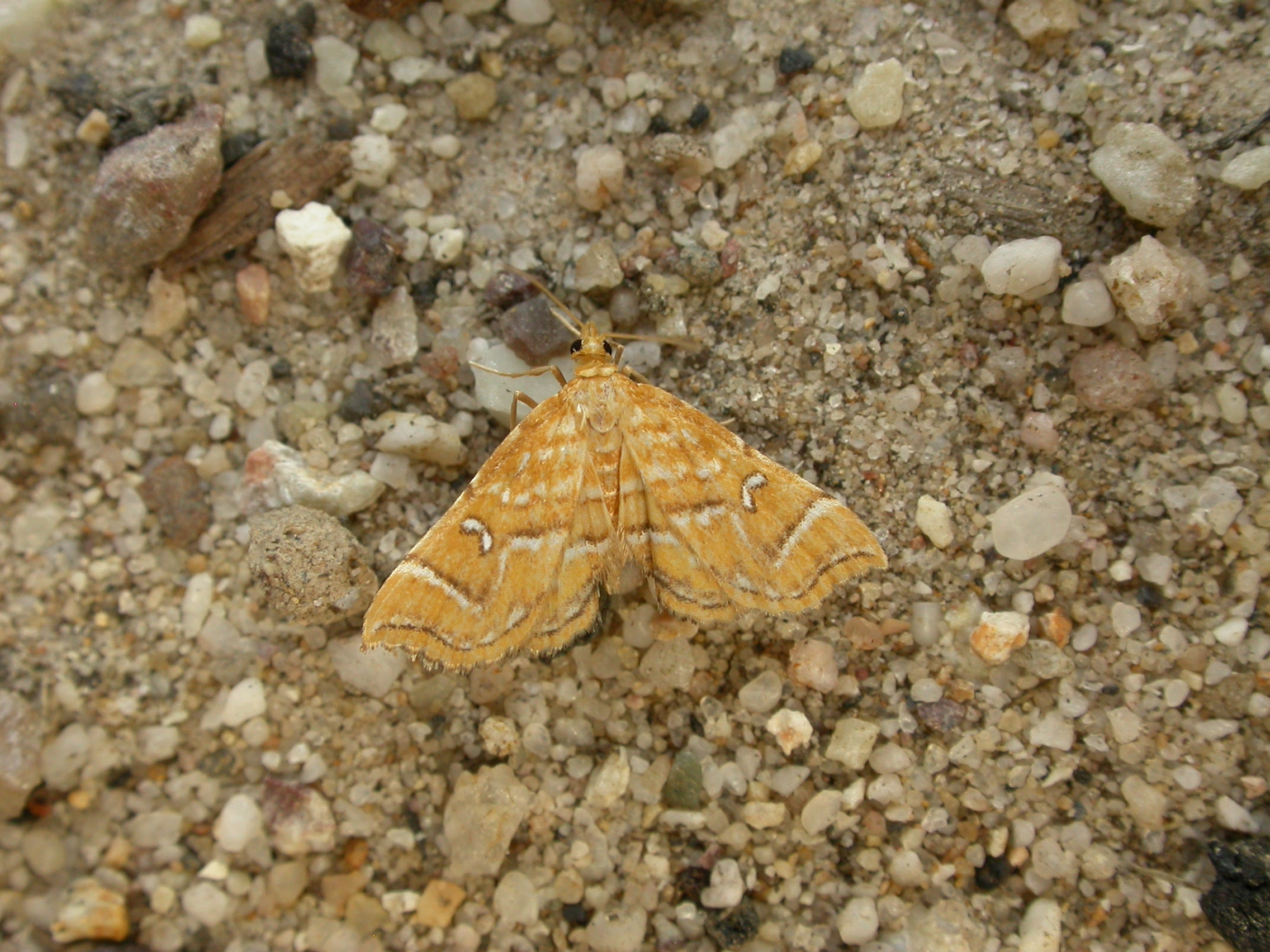

Scientific classification
- Kingdom: Animalia
- Phylum: Arthropoda
- Class: Insecta
- Order: Lepidoptera
- Family: Crambidae
- Genus: Musotima
- Species: M. ochropteralis

Binomial name
- Musotima ochropteralis (Guenée, 1854)

Synonyms
- Isopteryx ochropteralis Guenée, 1854

= Musotima ochropteralis =

Species of moth

Musotima ochropteralis is a moth of the family Crambidae. It was described by Achille Guenée in 1854 and is known from all of Australia. This species has been introduced to New Zealand.

The larvae feed on Adiantum aethiopicum.
