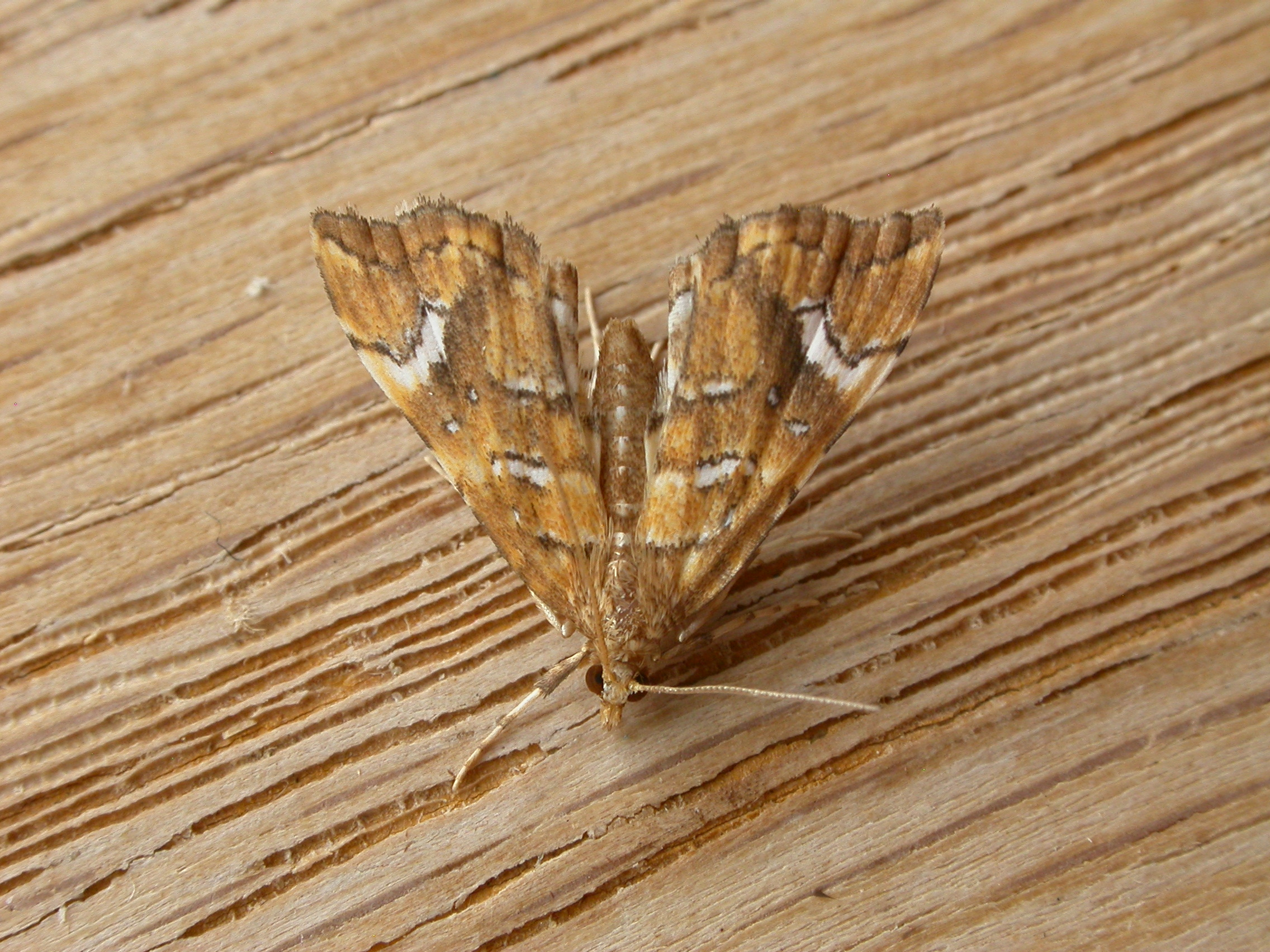

Scientific classification
- Kingdom: Animalia
- Phylum: Arthropoda
- Clade: Pancrustacea
- Class: Insecta
- Order: Lepidoptera
- Family: Crambidae
- Genus: Musotima
- Species: M. nitidalis

Binomial name
- Musotima nitidalis (Walker, 1866)

Synonyms
- Isopteryx nitidalis Walker, 1866; Diathrausta timaralis Felder & Rogenhofer, 1875

= Musotima nitidalis =

Species of moth

Musotima nitidalis, also known as the golden brown fern moth, is a species of moth of the family Crambidae. This species was described by Francis Walker in 1866. It is native to Australia and New Zealand and was first found in Europe in 2009.

== Description ==
The larvae of this species are pale green with a transparent skin and a dark head. Adults are brown with various white markings outlined in black on each forewing.

== Hosts ==
In Australia and New Zealand the larvae feed on the undersides of the fronds of various Polypodiophyta species, including common maidenhair fern (Adiantum aethiopicum), austral bracken (Pteridium esculentum), and bat's wing fern (Histiopteris incisa) and lives in a sparse web. Larvae were first found in England in 2013, near Hern, Dorset, and have been found feeding on bracken (Pteridium aquilinum), broad-buckler fern (Dryopteris dilatata) and hard fern (Blechnum spicant).

== Distribution ==
It is known from New Zealand and most of Australia, including Queensland, South Australia, Tasmania, Victoria and Western Australia. In 2009 the moth was found at Merritown Heath, Hurn, Dorset and since then across southern England to Norfolk. It is suspected to have been introduced from imported tree ferns.
