= Malickyella lobophoralis =

Scientific classification
- Kingdom: Animalia
- Phylum: Arthropoda
- Clade: Pancrustacea
- Class: Insecta
- Order: Lepidoptera
- Family: Crambidae
- Genus: Malickyella
- Species: M. lobophoralis

Binomial name
- Malickyella lobophoralis (Hampson, 1896)

Species of moth

Mayickyella lobophoralis is a snout moth in the subfamily Spilomelinae of the family Crambidae. It was described by George Hampson in 1896 in the genus Ambia based on specimens collected in the Indian states of Sikkim and Nagaland.

The species was formerly considered as a member of the Eoophyla lobophoralis species group in the Acentropinae, but was transferred to the newly created Spilomelinae genus Malickyella, of which M. lobophoralis is the type species.

Neobalanocarpus heimii, a hardwood tree species in the Dipterocarpaceae family, has been reported as the foodplant, where the larva feeds on the leaves.
