= Malickyella tigridalis =

Scientific classification
- Kingdom: Animalia
- Phylum: Arthropoda
- Clade: Pancrustacea
- Class: Insecta
- Order: Lepidoptera
- Family: Crambidae
- Genus: Malickyella
- Species: M. tigridalis

Binomial name
- Malickyella tigridalis (Hampson, 1897)

Species of moth

Malickyella tigridalis is a snout moth in the subfamily Spilomelinae of the family Crambidae. It was described by George Hampson in 1897 in the genus Ambia based on specimens collected on Borneo.

The species was formerly considered as a member of the Eoophyla lobophoralis species group in the Acentropinae, but was transferred to the newly created Spilomelinae genus Malickyella in 2010.
