= Ambia mantasoalis =

Scientific classification
- Kingdom: Animalia
- Phylum: Arthropoda
- Clade: Pancrustacea
- Class: Insecta
- Order: Lepidoptera
- Family: Crambidae
- Genus: Ambia
- Species: A. mantasoalis

Binomial name
- Ambia mantasoalis Viette, 1978

Species of moth

Ambia mantasoalis is a moth in the family Crambidae. It was described by Viette in 1978. It is found in Madagascar.
