= Ambia xantholeuca =

Scientific classification
- Kingdom: Animalia
- Phylum: Arthropoda
- Clade: Pancrustacea
- Class: Insecta
- Order: Lepidoptera
- Family: Crambidae
- Genus: Ambia
- Species: A. xantholeuca

Binomial name
- Ambia xantholeuca Hampson, 1896

Species of moth

Ambia xantholeuca is a moth in the family Crambidae first described by George Hampson in 1896. It is found in Sri Lanka.

== Description ==
The wingspan is about 14 mm. Female whitish. Head, thorax and abdomen with orange marks. Forewing with orange bands. A discocellular orange patch is visible, with an oblique line from it to costa and small triangular spot on costa. Some black irroration (speckles) can be found beyond the discocellular patch. Hindwings also possess orange band with a black-edged orange medial band. Costa with some black color which is spread toward inner area.
