= Musotima kumatai =

Scientific classification
- Kingdom: Animalia
- Phylum: Arthropoda
- Class: Insecta
- Order: Lepidoptera
- Family: Crambidae
- Genus: Musotima
- Species: M. kumatai

Binomial name
- Musotima kumatai Inoue, 1996

Species of moth

Musotima kumatai is a moth in the family Crambidae. It was described by Hiroshi Inoue in 1996. It is found in Japan.
