= Ambia fusalis =

Scientific classification
- Kingdom: Animalia
- Phylum: Arthropoda
- Clade: Pancrustacea
- Class: Insecta
- Order: Lepidoptera
- Family: Crambidae
- Genus: Ambia
- Species: A. fusalis

Binomial name
- Ambia fusalis Hampson, 1906

Species of moth

Ambia fusalis is a moth in the family Crambidae. It is found in Indonesia (Bali).

The wingspan is about 20 mm. Adults are orange suffused with fuscous, the forewings with a curved, grey antemedial line. The fovea of the forewing are whitish and there is a discoidal black spot and a dark-edged grey postmedial band incurved below vein 3, as well as a terminal orange band with fuscous terminal spots and defined on the inner side by a black line with grey line inside it.
