= Ambia tenebrosalis =

Scientific classification
- Kingdom: Animalia
- Phylum: Arthropoda
- Clade: Pancrustacea
- Class: Insecta
- Order: Lepidoptera
- Family: Crambidae
- Genus: Ambia
- Species: A. tenebrosalis

Binomial name
- Ambia tenebrosalis Hampson, 1896

Species of moth

Ambia tenebrosalis is a moth in the family Crambidae. It is found in Sri Lanka.

== Description ==
The wingspan is about 12 mm. Both wings possess stalked veins 4 and 5. Head and thorax fuscous and white marks. Abdomen also fuscous with white rings. Anal tuft is whitish. Wings fuscous. Forewing has indistinct dark sub-basal line, with some white on its outer edge. There are two indistinct medial lines with a white patch on costa between them with a black speck on it. A black-edged fulvous marginal band is present. Hindwing with dark discocellular lunule and indistinct double sinuous postmedial line.
