= Musotima incrustalis =

Scientific classification
- Kingdom: Animalia
- Phylum: Arthropoda
- Class: Insecta
- Order: Lepidoptera
- Family: Crambidae
- Genus: Musotima
- Species: M. incrustalis

Binomial name
- Musotima incrustalis Snellen, 1895

Species of moth

Musotima incrustalis is a moth in the family Crambidae. It was described by Snellen in 1895. It is found on Java.
