= Ambia fulvicolor =

Scientific classification
- Kingdom: Animalia
- Phylum: Arthropoda
- Clade: Pancrustacea
- Class: Insecta
- Order: Lepidoptera
- Family: Crambidae
- Genus: Ambia
- Species: A. fulvicolor

Binomial name
- Ambia fulvicolor Hampson, 1917

Species of moth

Ambia fulvicolor is a moth in the family Crambidae. It was described by George Hampson in 1917 and it is found in New Guinea.

The wingspan is about 18 mm. The forewings are yellow suffused with fulvous. There is an oblique subbasal silvery-white band from the cell to the inner margin, with some red brown before it. There is also some dark brown on the costa before the antemedial silvery-white band, which is interrupted in the cell, oblique towards the costa and below the cell and defined by red brown. The cell is suffused with red brown except towards the base and there is a fulvous lunule at the end of the cell defined by dark brown and with some white beyond it. The fovea above the end of the cell are white defined by dark brown and with a silvery-white point above it on the costa. There is some dark brown on the costa before an oblique silvery-white postmedial band from the costa to vein 4 and a triangular mark from vein 2 to the inner margin, both defined on the outer side by the dark brown postmedial line which is angled inwards at vein 2, the costa beyond it is dark brown. There is also a slightly sinuous dark brown subterminal line with a series of small silvery-white spots before it from below the costa to the inner margin, the hair on which is dark brown below it. The hindwings are yellow, suffused with fulvous along median the nervure and on the terminal area. The base is white and there is an oblique silvery-white antemedial band defined by dark red brown, as well as a fulvous discoidal spot defined by dark red brown. The postmedial line is dark brown, defined on the inner side by a silvery-white band, slightly incurved below vein 4. There is also a sinuous dark brown subterminal line defined on the inner side by silvery-white spots, small to vein 5, then interrupted to just above vein 3, larger and more diffused below vein 3.
