= Ambia marmorealis =

Scientific classification
- Kingdom: Animalia
- Phylum: Arthropoda
- Clade: Pancrustacea
- Class: Insecta
- Order: Lepidoptera
- Family: Crambidae
- Genus: Ambia
- Species: A. marmorealis

Binomial name
- Ambia marmorealis Marion & Viette, 1956

Species of moth

Ambia marmorealis is a moth in the family Crambidae. It was described by Hubert Marion and Pierre Viette in 1956. It is found on Madagascar.
