= Ambia cymophoralis =

Scientific classification
- Kingdom: Animalia
- Phylum: Arthropoda
- Clade: Pancrustacea
- Class: Insecta
- Order: Lepidoptera
- Family: Crambidae
- Genus: Ambia
- Species: A. cymophoralis

Binomial name
- Ambia cymophoralis Hampson, 1917

Species of moth

Ambia cymophoralis is a moth in the family Crambidae described by George Hampson in 1917. It is found on St Aignan Island in the Louisiade Archipelago of Papua New Guinea.

The wingspan is 16–18 mm. The forewings are orange yellow with a fulvous tinge and some white at the base in and below the cell. There is an erect silvery-white subbasal band and a silvery-white band just before middle, defined on each side by dark brown below the cell, excurved below the costa and above the inner margin and emitting a spur at the discal fold to the white discoidal lunule defined by black except above. The medial part of the costa is white and there is a silvery-white wedge-shaped mark in the discal fold before the postmedial band, which is silvery white defined on each side by dark brown, incurved below the costa, then excurved to vein 3, below which it is angled inwards, then erect with its outer edge excurved at the submedian fold. There is also a silvery-white subterminal band from the costa to vein 1, defined on each side by dark brown, strongly on the outer side, its extremities at the costa and above vein 1 dilated into spots, excurved between those points. The hindwings are orange yellow with a slight fulvous tinge and a white base. There is a silvery white antemedial band from the cell to the inner margin connected with a silvery-white patch in the end of the cell with a black discoidal bar on its outer edge. There is also a silvery-white postmedial band, excurved and defined on the outer side by brown to vein 2, then incurved. The subterminal band is silvery white, defined on each side by black from the costa to vein 1, its extremities on the costa and above vein 1 expanding into spots, excurved between those points.
