= Ambia tendicularis =

Scientific classification
- Kingdom: Animalia
- Phylum: Arthropoda
- Clade: Pancrustacea
- Class: Insecta
- Order: Lepidoptera
- Family: Crambidae
- Genus: Ambia
- Species: A. tendicularis

Binomial name
- Ambia tendicularis Rebel, 1915

Species of moth

Ambia tendicularis is a moth in the family Crambidae. It was described by Rebel in 1915. It is found on Samoa.
