= Ambia anosibalis =

Scientific classification
- Kingdom: Animalia
- Phylum: Arthropoda
- Clade: Pancrustacea
- Class: Insecta
- Order: Lepidoptera
- Family: Crambidae
- Genus: Ambia
- Species: A. anosibalis

Binomial name
- Ambia anosibalis Viette, 1958

Species of moth

Ambia anosibalis is a moth in the family Crambidae. It was described by Pierre Viette in 1958. It is found in Madagascar.
