= Musotima acrias =

Scientific classification
- Kingdom: Animalia
- Phylum: Arthropoda
- Class: Insecta
- Order: Lepidoptera
- Family: Crambidae
- Genus: Musotima
- Species: M. acrias

Binomial name
- Musotima acrias Meyrick, 1884

Species of moth

Musotima acrias is a moth in the family Crambidae. It was described by Edward Meyrick in 1884. It is found in Australia, where it has been recorded from New South Wales and Tasmania.

The wingspan is 17–18 mm. The forewings are whitish ochreous, mixed and suffused with reddish ochreous and with some scattered fuscous scales. There is a very small blackish spot on the inner margin near the base, and another in the disc beyond it, both followed by small obscure white spots. There is a row of four similar spots, preceded by small white spots, crossing the wing. The hindwings are white, partly mixed with ochreous in the disc. There is a straight dark fuscous line at one-third from the middle to the inner margin and an irregular dark fuscous discal spot, connected with the inner margin by a thick curved dark fuscous line.
