= Ambia vagilinealis =

Scientific classification
- Kingdom: Animalia
- Phylum: Arthropoda
- Clade: Pancrustacea
- Class: Insecta
- Order: Lepidoptera
- Family: Crambidae
- Genus: Ambia
- Species: A. vagilinealis

Binomial name
- Ambia vagilinealis Hampson, 1906

Species of moth

Ambia vagilinealis is a moth in the family Crambidae. It is found in Papua New Guinea.

The wingspan is about 16 mm. The forewings are brown, with an oblique straight white subbasal line and a white lunule in the middle of the cell with the antemedial line excurved round it, emitting two branches at the costa and retracted at the median nervure. There is a white line from the costa to the lower angle of the cell, with a fork to the costa and a short branch at the middle of discocellulars. The postmedial line is bent outwards to the costa, with a short spur at vein 5 and at vein 2, retracted to the lower angle of the cell. There is a sinuous black subterminal line with a slight white line on its inner edge, as well as a fine terminal fuscous line. The hindwings are brown, with black-edged, straight, antemedial white band and a wedge-shaped, black-edged white discoidal patch from the costa to the lower end of the cell, where it joins the sinuous postmedial line, which is retracted at vein 2 and interrupted by the bands. There is also a subterminal white line with a black outer edge, angled inwards at vein 5. The terminal line is fine and black.
