= Ambia pedionoma =

Scientific classification
- Kingdom: Animalia
- Phylum: Arthropoda
- Clade: Pancrustacea
- Class: Insecta
- Order: Lepidoptera
- Family: Crambidae
- Genus: Ambia
- Species: A. pedionoma

Binomial name
- Ambia pedionoma West, 1931

Species of moth

Ambia pedionoma is a moth in the family Crambidae. It is found in the Philippines (Palawan).
