= Ambia albiflavalis =

Scientific classification
- Kingdom: Animalia
- Phylum: Arthropoda
- Clade: Pancrustacea
- Class: Insecta
- Order: Lepidoptera
- Family: Crambidae
- Genus: Ambia
- Species: A. albiflavalis

Binomial name
- Ambia albiflavalis Hampson, 1917

Species of moth

Ambia albiflavalis is an African moth in the family Crambidae. It was described by George Hampson in 1917. The type locality is Nigeria.

The wingspan is about 14 mm. The forewings are silvery white, the base is orange yellow with an oblique outer edge. There is an obliquely curved orange-yellow antemedial band. The end of the cell is tinged with brown and the fovea above it with two brown points on its upper edge. There is a yellow patch with a white spot on it beyond it on the costal area and an orange-yellow subterminal band defined at the sides by brown, obliquely curved to vein 2, then bent outwards to the tornus, giving off (on the inner side between veins 4 and 2) a yellowish fascia tinged with brown to the lower end of the cell. There is also a pale brown terminal band. The hindwings are silvery white with an orange-yellow antemedial band from the cell to the inner margin, as well as a curved orange-yellow postmedial band defined by red brown from the costa to vein 1, its outer edge angled outwards at vein 4. There is a sinuous orange-yellow subterminal band defined by red brown and ending at the tornus, its outer edge excurved at the discal fold to the narrow orange-yellow terminal band defined on the inner side by a red-brown line and ending at the orange-yellow band at the submedian fold.
