= Ambia prolalis =

Scientific classification
- Kingdom: Animalia
- Phylum: Arthropoda
- Clade: Pancrustacea
- Class: Insecta
- Order: Lepidoptera
- Family: Crambidae
- Genus: Ambia
- Species: A. prolalis

Binomial name
- Ambia prolalis Viette, 1958

Species of moth

Ambia prolalis is a moth in the family Crambidae. It was described by Viette in 1958. It is found on the Comoros (Grande Comore).
