= Musotima suffusalis =

Scientific classification
- Kingdom: Animalia
- Phylum: Arthropoda
- Class: Insecta
- Order: Lepidoptera
- Family: Crambidae
- Genus: Musotima
- Species: M. suffusalis

Binomial name
- Musotima suffusalis (Hampson, 1893)

Synonyms
- Ambia suffusalis Hampson, 1893

Species of moth

Musotima suffusalis is a moth in the family Crambidae. It was described by George Hampson in 1893. It is found in southern India and Sri Lanka.
