= Ambia mesoscotalis =

Scientific classification
- Kingdom: Animalia
- Phylum: Arthropoda
- Clade: Pancrustacea
- Class: Insecta
- Order: Lepidoptera
- Family: Crambidae
- Genus: Ambia
- Species: A. mesoscotalis

Binomial name
- Ambia mesoscotalis Hampson, 1906

Species of moth

Ambia mesoscotalis is a moth in the family Crambidae. It is found in Indonesia, where it has been recorded from the Maluku Islands (Banda).

The wingspan is about 12 mm. The base of the forewings is fuscous, with an obscure white subbasal line and an orange-yellow band on its outer edge. There is a medial orange-yellow line expanding outwards on the costal area, with a white discoidal lunule on it and some fuscous on its lower edge. There is also an orange-yellow band edged by a fuscous line curved round from the costa before the apex to the lower angle of the cell and emitting a streak on the costa. There is also a terminal orange band with a fine fuscous line on its inner side, and suddenly bent outwards to the cilia just before the apex, where there is a black point. The hindwings are white with a fuscous medial band with some orange on its inner edge. There is a postmedial orange band not extending below vein 2 and emitting streaks to the apex and termen at veins 5, 3 and 2.
