= Ambia argentifascialis =

Scientific classification
- Kingdom: Animalia
- Phylum: Arthropoda
- Clade: Pancrustacea
- Class: Insecta
- Order: Lepidoptera
- Family: Crambidae
- Genus: Ambia
- Species: A. argentifascialis

Binomial name
- Ambia argentifascialis Marion, 1957

Species of moth

Ambia argentifascialis is a moth in the family Crambidae. It was described by H. Marion in 1957. It is found on Madagascar.
