= Ambia ellipes =

Scientific classification
- Kingdom: Animalia
- Phylum: Arthropoda
- Clade: Pancrustacea
- Class: Insecta
- Order: Lepidoptera
- Family: Crambidae
- Genus: Ambia
- Species: A. ellipes

Binomial name
- Ambia ellipes (Tams, 1935)

Synonyms
- Baeoptila ellipes Tams, 1935

Species of moth

Ambia ellipes is a moth in the family Crambidae. It is found in Samoa.
