= Musotima pudica =

Scientific classification
- Kingdom: Animalia
- Phylum: Arthropoda
- Class: Insecta
- Order: Lepidoptera
- Family: Crambidae
- Genus: Musotima
- Species: M. pudica

Binomial name
- Musotima pudica (T. P. Lucas, 1894)

Synonyms
- Paraponyx pudica T. P. Lucas, 1894; Musotima persinualis Hampson, 1897

Species of moth

Musotima pudica is a moth in the family Crambidae. The adult moths of Musotima pudica have white wings with yellow, orange, and brown markings outlined in dark brown, and an average wingspan of about 1.3 cm. It was described by Thomas Pennington Lucas in 1894. It is found on Amboina, Tenimber, Fergusson Island and in Australia, where it has been recorded from Queensland.
