= Ambia locuples =

Scientific classification
- Kingdom: Animalia
- Phylum: Arthropoda
- Clade: Pancrustacea
- Class: Insecta
- Order: Lepidoptera
- Family: Crambidae
- Genus: Ambia
- Species: A. locuples

Binomial name
- Ambia locuples (Butler, 1889)

Synonyms
- Oligostigma locuples Butler, 1889; Musotina locuples

Species of moth

Ambia locuples is a moth in the family Crambidae. It was described by Arthur Gardiner Butler in 1889. It is found in India.

The wingspan is about 11 mm. The forewings are bright silver with golden-ochreous bands, for the most part narrowly edged with blackish. The hindwings have four ochreous bands.
