= Ambia catalaianus =

Scientific classification
- Kingdom: Animalia
- Phylum: Arthropoda
- Clade: Pancrustacea
- Class: Insecta
- Order: Lepidoptera
- Family: Crambidae
- Genus: Ambia
- Species: A. catalaianus

Binomial name
- Ambia catalaianus (Viette, 1954)

Synonyms
- Metathyrida catalaianus Viette, 1954

Species of moth

Ambia catalaianus is a moth in the family Crambidae. It was described by Viette in 1954. It is found in Madagascar.
