= Ambia iambealis =

Scientific classification
- Kingdom: Animalia
- Phylum: Arthropoda
- Clade: Pancrustacea
- Class: Insecta
- Order: Lepidoptera
- Family: Crambidae
- Genus: Ambia
- Species: A. iambealis

Binomial name
- Ambia iambealis (Walker, 1859)

Species of moth

Ambia iambealis is a moth in the family Crambidae first described by Francis Walker in 1859. It is found in Sri Lanka.

== Description ==
It is a moth with orange-yellow body. Head and thorax marked with white, whereas abdomen ringed with white. Base of the forewing has a white spot. There are oblique subbasal and antemedial white bands. White streaks can be seen below the costal gland and also in end of the cell. The wingspan is about 16–18 mm.
