= Ambia magnificalis =

Scientific classification
- Kingdom: Animalia
- Phylum: Arthropoda
- Clade: Pancrustacea
- Class: Insecta
- Order: Lepidoptera
- Family: Crambidae
- Genus: Ambia
- Species: A. magnificalis

Binomial name
- Ambia magnificalis C. Swinhoe, 1895

Species of moth

Ambia magnificalis is a moth in the family Crambidae. It was described by Charles Swinhoe in 1895. It is found in India.
