= Musotima leucomma =

Scientific classification
- Kingdom: Animalia
- Phylum: Arthropoda
- Class: Insecta
- Order: Lepidoptera
- Family: Crambidae
- Genus: Musotima
- Species: M. leucomma

Binomial name
- Musotima leucomma (Hampson, 1917)

Synonyms
- Oligostigma leucomma Hampson, 1917

Species of moth

Musotima leucomma is a moth in the family Crambidae. It was described by George Hampson in 1917. It is found in Australia, where it has been recorded from Queensland.

The wingspan is about 16–18 mm. The forewings are white, the costal and terminal areas suffused with fulvous yellow. The hindwings are white, the terminal area suffused with fulvous yellow.
