= Ambia melanalis =

Scientific classification
- Kingdom: Animalia
- Phylum: Arthropoda
- Clade: Pancrustacea
- Class: Insecta
- Order: Lepidoptera
- Family: Crambidae
- Genus: Ambia
- Species: A. melanalis

Binomial name
- Ambia melanalis Hampson, 1906

Species of moth

Ambia melanalis is a moth in the family Crambidae. It was described by George Hampson in 1906. It is found in South Africa.

The wingspan is about 14 mm. The forewings are black brown, suffused with greyish and tinged with yellowish in places. There is an antemedial white spot on the costa with a slight oblique sinuous whitish line from it to the inner margin and a slight white discoidal lunule defined by black. There is also a postmedial white spot on the costa with an excurved line from it to vein 4, then almost obsolete and retracted to a white patch on the inner area below the end of the cell. There is also a white subapical point and a slight subterminal line between veins 7 and 4. The hindwings are black brown tinged with yellowish and slightly suffused with grey. There are two small white spots at the end of the cell and a postmedial line represented by a white bar from the costa and traces of a line towards the tornus. There is also a white terminal line from the costa to vein 6, angled outwards at the apex.
