= Ambia thyridialis =

Scientific classification
- Kingdom: Animalia
- Phylum: Arthropoda
- Clade: Pancrustacea
- Class: Insecta
- Order: Lepidoptera
- Family: Crambidae
- Genus: Ambia
- Species: A. thyridialis

Binomial name
- Ambia thyridialis (Lederer, 1855)

Synonyms
- Nymphola thyridialis Lederer, 1855

Species of moth

Ambia thyridialis is a moth in the family Crambidae. It was described by Julius Lederer in 1855. It is found in Syria and Lebanon.
