= Ambia schistochaeta =

Scientific classification
- Kingdom: Animalia
- Phylum: Arthropoda
- Clade: Pancrustacea
- Class: Insecta
- Order: Lepidoptera
- Family: Crambidae
- Genus: Ambia
- Species: A. schistochaeta

Binomial name
- Ambia schistochaeta Tams, 1935

Species of moth

Ambia schistochaeta is a moth in the family Crambidae. It was described by Willie Horace Thomas Tams in 1935. It is found on Samoa, Tutuila, and Pago Pago.
