= Ambia chrysogramma =

Scientific classification
- Kingdom: Animalia
- Phylum: Arthropoda
- Clade: Pancrustacea
- Class: Insecta
- Order: Lepidoptera
- Family: Crambidae
- Genus: Ambia
- Species: A. chrysogramma

Binomial name
- Ambia chrysogramma Hampson, 1917

Species of moth

Ambia chrysogramma is a moth in the family Crambidae. It was described by George Hampson in 1917. It is found on Samoa.

The wingspan is about 12 mm. The forewings are silvery white, the costa tinged with orange yellow towards the base. There is a small tuft of rufous scales below the middle of the costa with the orange-yellow antemedial and medial lines arising below it and rather diverging towards the inner margin. There is also a conical postmedial patch defined by orange yellow from the costa to vein 5, with a brown point on the line defining its outer side at the costa. There is also an orange-yellow subterminal line, excurved to the submedian fold, where it is angled inwards and a fine yellow-brown line beyond it, incurved below vein 2, the terminal area tinged with yellow. The hindwings are silvery white with a small orange-yellow discoidal spot and an orange-yellow postmedial line, excurved to vein 4, then bent inwards to the origin of vein 2 and oblique to the inner margin. There is also an orange-yellow subterminal line, excurved to vein 2, then incurved, with a fine yellow-brown line beyond it. The terminal area is tinged with yellow.
