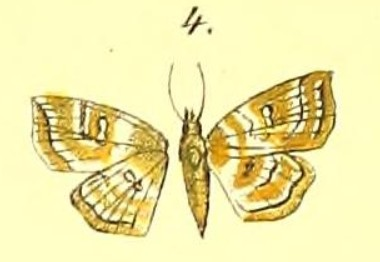

Scientific classification
- Kingdom: Animalia
- Phylum: Arthropoda
- Clade: Pancrustacea
- Class: Insecta
- Order: Lepidoptera
- Family: Crambidae
- Genus: Ambia
- Species: A. colonalis

Binomial name
- Ambia colonalis (Bremer, 1864)

Synonyms
- Hydrocampa colonalis Bremer, 1864; Oligostigma dives Butler, 1889

= Ambia colonalis =

Species of moth

Ambia colonalis is a moth in the family Crambidae. It was described by Otto Vasilievich Bremer in 1864. It is found in Japan, Taiwan, the Russian Far East (Amur) and the western Himalayas.
