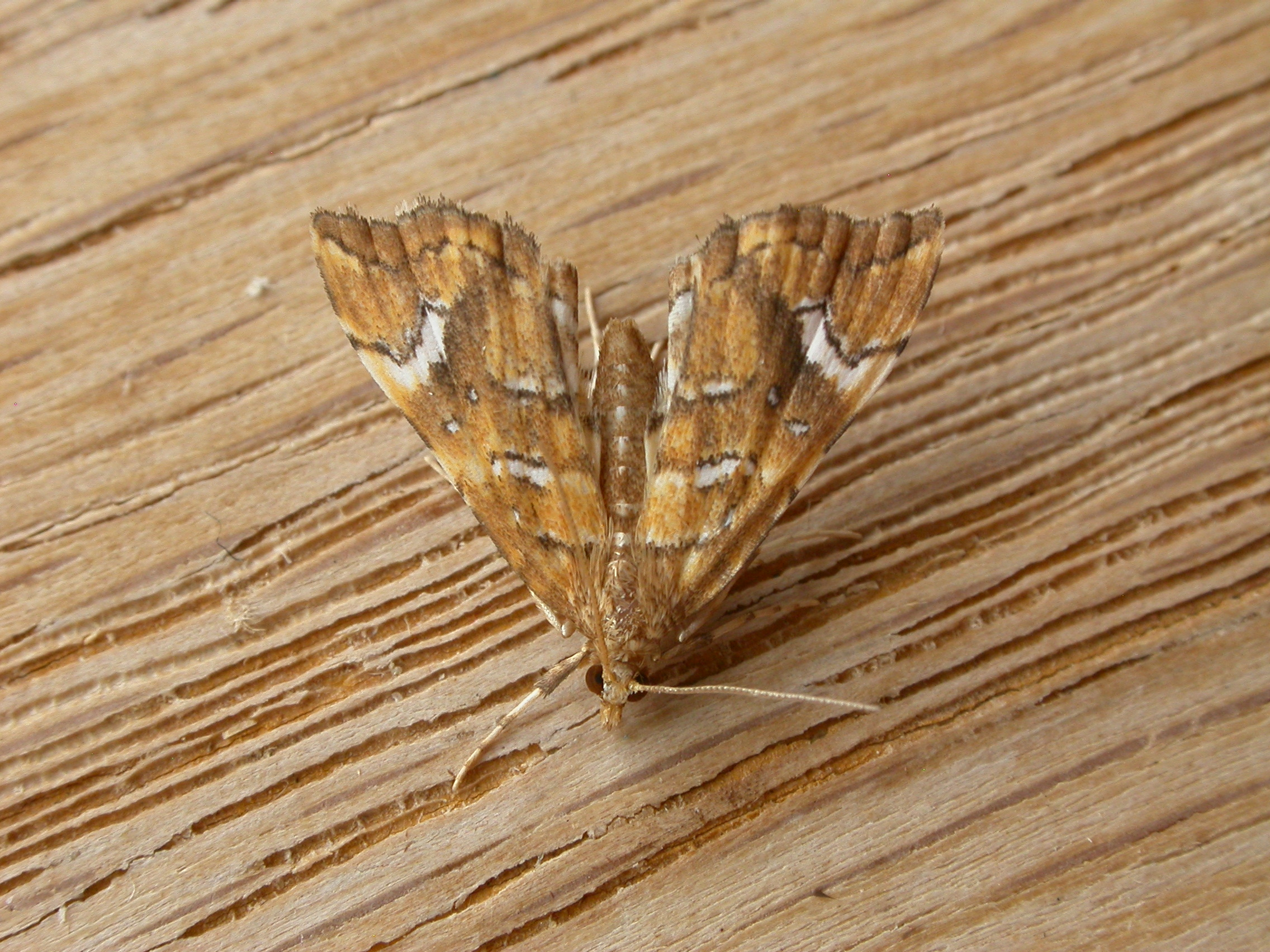

Scientific classification
- Domain: Eukaryota
- Kingdom: Animalia
- Phylum: Arthropoda
- Class: Insecta
- Order: Lepidoptera
- Family: Crambidae
- Subfamily: Musotiminae
- Genus: Musotima; Meyrick, 1884

Synonyms
- Musotina Caradja, 1927

= Musotima =

Genus of moths

Musotima is a genus of moths of the family Crambidae.

== Species ==
- Musotima acclaralis (Walker, 1859)
- Musotima acrias Meyrick, 1884
- Musotima aduncalis (C. Felder, R. Felder & Rogenhofer, 1875)
- Musotima decoralis Snellen, 1901
- Musotima dryopterisivora Yoshiyasu, 1985
- Musotima franckei Caradja, 1927
- Musotima incrustalis Snellen, 1895
- Musotima instrumentalis Swinhoe, 1894
- Musotima kumatai Inoue, 1996
- Musotima leucomma (Hampson, 1917)
- Musotima nitidalis (Walker, 1866)
- Musotima nubilalis South in Leech & South, 1901
- Musotima ochropteralis (Guenée, 1854)
- Musotima pudica (T. P. Lucas, 1894)
- Musotima suffusalis (Hampson, 1893)
- Musotima tanzawensis Yoshiyasu, 1985
