= Ambia yamanakai =

Scientific classification
- Kingdom: Animalia
- Phylum: Arthropoda
- Clade: Pancrustacea
- Class: Insecta
- Order: Lepidoptera
- Family: Crambidae
- Genus: Ambia
- Species: A. yamanakai

Binomial name
- Ambia yamanakai Kirpichnikova, 1999

Species of moth

Ambia yamanakai is a moth in the family Crambidae. It was described by Valentina A. Kirpichnikova in 1999. It is found in the Russian Far East.
