= Musotima dryopterisivora =

Scientific classification
- Domain: Eukaryota
- Kingdom: Animalia
- Phylum: Arthropoda
- Class: Insecta
- Order: Lepidoptera
- Family: Crambidae
- Genus: Musotima
- Species: M. dryopterisivora

Binomial name
- Musotima dryopterisivora Yoshiyasu, 1985

Species of moth

Musotima dryopterisivora is a moth in the family Crambidae. It was described by Yoshiyasu in 1985. It is found in Japan.

The wingspan is 10–12 mm.
