= Musotima acclaralis =

Scientific classification
- Kingdom: Animalia
- Phylum: Arthropoda
- Class: Insecta
- Order: Lepidoptera
- Family: Crambidae
- Genus: Musotima
- Species: M. acclaralis

Binomial name
- Musotima acclaralis (Walker, 1859)

Synonyms
- Isopteryx acclaralis Walker, 1859

Species of moth

Musotima acclaralis is a moth in the family Crambidae. It was described by Francis Walker in 1859. It is found in Sri Lanka.
