= Ambia punctimarginata =

Scientific classification
- Kingdom: Animalia
- Phylum: Arthropoda
- Clade: Pancrustacea
- Class: Insecta
- Order: Lepidoptera
- Family: Crambidae
- Genus: Ambia
- Species: A. punctimarginata

Binomial name
- Ambia punctimarginata Rothschild, 1915

Species of moth

Ambia punctimarginata is a moth in the family Crambidae. It is found in Papua New Guinea.

The wingspan is about 14 mm. The forewings are white, with three spots on the costa and three indistinct dirty brown discal patches. There is a basal dot on the costa and a sooty black median spot below the subcostal vein. There is also a marginal band of sooty black spots. The hindwings are white with two or three irregular and indistinct patches of brown scales and a marginal row of sooty black spots.
