= Ambia ptolycusalis =

Scientific classification
- Kingdom: Animalia
- Phylum: Arthropoda
- Clade: Pancrustacea
- Class: Insecta
- Order: Lepidoptera
- Family: Crambidae
- Genus: Ambia
- Species: A. ptolycusalis

Binomial name
- Ambia ptolycusalis Walker, 1859

Species of moth

Ambia ptolycusalis is a species of moth of the family Crambidae. It is found in Queensland, Australia.

The larvae feed on Hydrilla species.
