= Ambia obliquistriga =

Scientific classification
- Kingdom: Animalia
- Phylum: Arthropoda
- Clade: Pancrustacea
- Class: Insecta
- Order: Lepidoptera
- Family: Crambidae
- Genus: Ambia
- Species: A. obliquistriga

Binomial name
- Ambia obliquistriga Rothschild, 1915

Species of moth

Ambia obliquistriga is a moth in the family Crambidae. It is found in Papua New Guinea.

The wingspan is about 12 mm. The forewings are white, clouded with more or less obsolete brownish smears. There are two dots on the basal part of the costa and one in the cell, as well as a spot at the apex of the cell and a streak on the outer part of vein 1. These spots are dark brown. There is also an oblique dark brown transverse line crosses the wing in the postdiscal area. The hindwings are white, clouded with brownish scales and with three dots in the basal part of the wing, as well as a line running in from the costa and a marginal row of dark brown dots.
