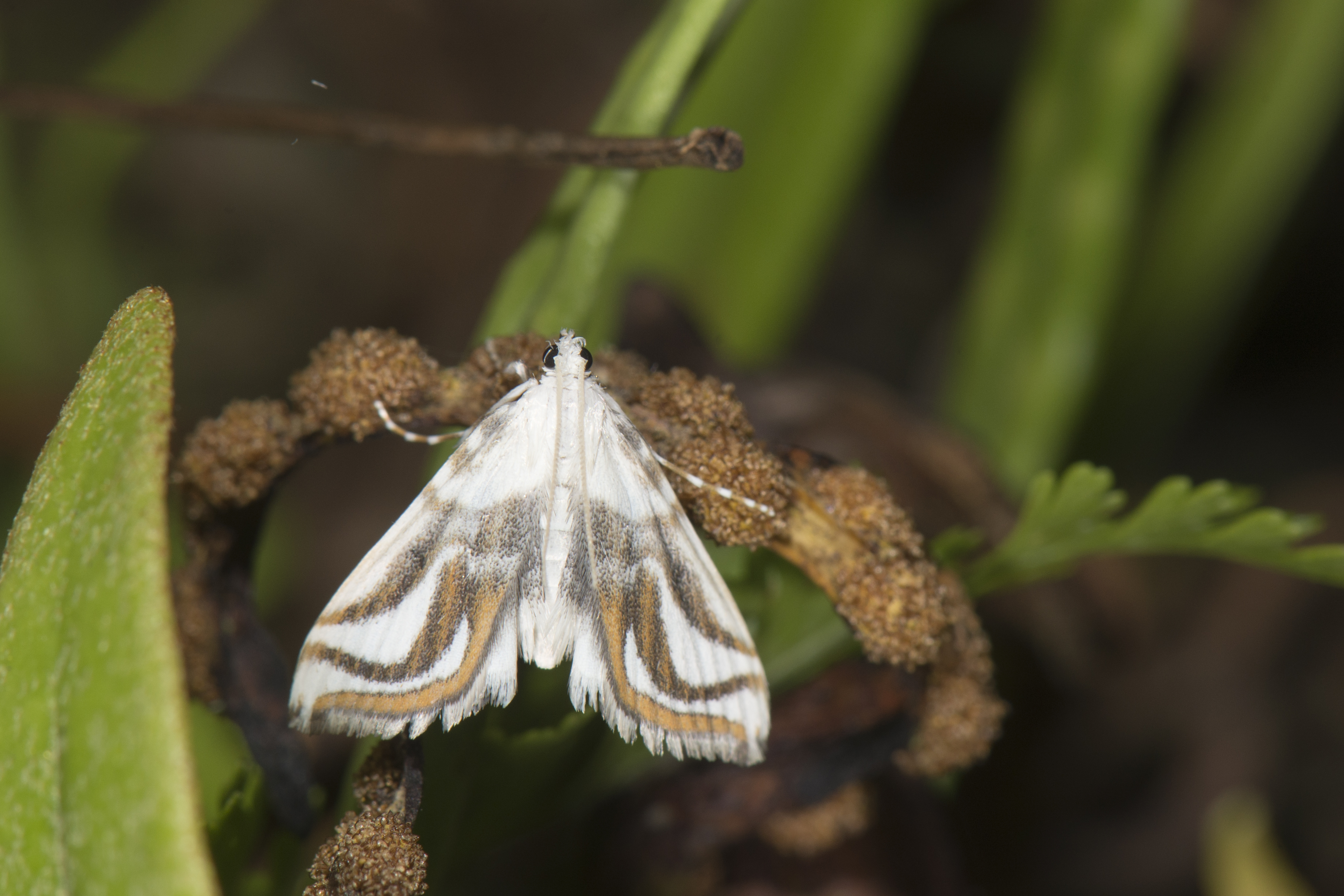

Scientific classification
- Kingdom: Animalia
- Phylum: Arthropoda
- Clade: Pancrustacea
- Class: Insecta
- Order: Lepidoptera
- Family: Crambidae
- Genus: Musotima
- Species: M. instrumentalis

Binomial name
- Musotima instrumentalis C. Swinhoe, 1894

= Musotima instrumentalis =

Species of moth

Musotima instrumentalis is a species of moth in the family Crambidae. It was described by Charles Swinhoe in 1894. It is found in Meghalaya, India and in Taiwan.
