= Ambia novaguinensis =

Scientific classification
- Kingdom: Animalia
- Phylum: Arthropoda
- Clade: Pancrustacea
- Class: Insecta
- Order: Lepidoptera
- Family: Crambidae
- Genus: Ambia
- Species: A. novaguinensis

Binomial name
- Ambia novaguinensis Kenrick, 1912

Species of moth

Ambia novaguinensis is a moth in the family Crambidae. It was described by George Hamilton Kenrick in 1912. It is found in Papua New Guinea.
