= Ambia chalcichroalis =

Scientific classification
- Kingdom: Animalia
- Phylum: Arthropoda
- Clade: Pancrustacea
- Class: Insecta
- Order: Lepidoptera
- Family: Crambidae
- Genus: Ambia
- Species: A. chalcichroalis

Binomial name
- Ambia chalcichroalis Hampson, 1906

Species of moth

Ambia chalcichroalis is a moth in the family Crambidae. It was described by George Hampson in 1906. It is found in South Africa.

The wingspan is about 18 mm. The forewings are bronze yellow suffused in parts with fuscous and with an antemedial white band, defined by black formed by a bar from the costa to the median nervure, and an oblique wedge-shaped patch from the cell to the inner margin. There is a small white discoidal lunule defined by black and a postmedial white band defined by black from the costa to vein 4, its inner edge sinuous and expanding at and below the costa. There is also a conical white patch defined by black from below the end of the cell to the inner margin and a subterminal white band defined by black and excurved and interrupted at the middle. The hindwings are bronze yellow suffused in parts with fuscous and with an ill-defined white subbasal band and an antemedial quadrate white patch defined by black from the costa to the median nervure, with a narrow white band defined by black from it to the inner margin and a postmedial curved white band defined by black from the costa to vein 4, its inner edge sinuous and expanding at and below the costa. There is also a curved white band defined by black from below the end of the cell to the inner margin and a subterminal maculate white band defined by black formed by a subapical spot. There are three conjoined spots between veins 7 and 4 and two spots towards the tornus.
