= Malickyella iriusalis =

Scientific classification
- Kingdom: Animalia
- Phylum: Arthropoda
- Clade: Pancrustacea
- Class: Insecta
- Order: Lepidoptera
- Family: Crambidae
- Genus: Malickyella
- Species: M. iriusalis

Binomial name
- Malickyella iriusalis (Walker, 1859)

Species of moth

Malickyella iriusalis is a snout moth in the subfamily Spilomelinae of the family Crambidae. It was described by Francis Walker in 1859 in the genus Oligostigma based on material collected on Borneo.

The species was formerly considered as a member of the Eoophyla lobophoralis species group in the Acentropinae, but was transferred to the newly created Spilomelinae genus Malickyella in 2010.
