= Ambia gueneealis =

Scientific classification
- Kingdom: Animalia
- Phylum: Arthropoda
- Clade: Pancrustacea
- Class: Insecta
- Order: Lepidoptera
- Family: Crambidae
- Genus: Ambia
- Species: A. gueneealis

Binomial name
- Ambia gueneealis Viette, 1957

Species of moth

Ambia gueneealis is a moth in the family Crambidae. It was described by Viette in 1957. It is found on La Réunion.
