= Ambia ambrealis =

Scientific classification
- Kingdom: Animalia
- Phylum: Arthropoda
- Clade: Pancrustacea
- Class: Insecta
- Order: Lepidoptera
- Family: Crambidae
- Genus: Ambia
- Species: A. ambrealis

Binomial name
- Ambia ambrealis Viette, 1960

Species of moth

Ambia ambrealis is a moth in the family Crambidae. It was described by Viette in 1960. It is found in Madagascar.
