= Musotima franckei =

Scientific classification
- Domain: Eukaryota
- Kingdom: Animalia
- Phylum: Arthropoda
- Class: Insecta
- Order: Lepidoptera
- Family: Crambidae
- Genus: Musotima
- Species: M. franckei

Binomial name
- Musotima franckei Caradja, 1927

Synonyms
- Musotima francki

Species of moth

Musotima franckei is a moth in the family Crambidae. It was described by Aristide Caradja in 1927. It is found in China.
