= Ambia melanistis =

Scientific classification
- Kingdom: Animalia
- Phylum: Arthropoda
- Clade: Pancrustacea
- Class: Insecta
- Order: Lepidoptera
- Family: Crambidae
- Genus: Ambia
- Species: A. melanistis

Binomial name
- Ambia melanistis Hampson, 1917

Species of moth

Ambia melanistis is a moth in the family Crambidae. It was described by George Hampson in 1917 and it is found in Taiwan.

The wingspan is about 12 mm. The forewings are very dark red brown with a blackish tinge and with an antemedial white point on the costa and medial bar from the costa, there is also a slightly excurved punctiform white postmedial line from the costa to the discal fold, the line then almost obsolete and incurved below vein 4, with white points above and below vein 1. There is a metallic silvery patch before it between veins 3 and 1 and a small spot at the middle of the inner margin, as well as a curved punctiform white subterminal line. The hindwings are very dark red brown with a blackish tinge, the basal part of the costa is white. There is an antemedial white point on the inner margin and a small metallic silvery spot beyond the cell, as well as an oblique postmedial white band from the costa to vein 4 and a minute spot above the tornus. There is also a curved white subterminal line from the costa to the discal fold and a series of striae between the discal fold and vein 1. The termen is more rufous.
