= Ambia naumanni =

Scientific classification
- Kingdom: Animalia
- Phylum: Arthropoda
- Clade: Pancrustacea
- Class: Insecta
- Order: Lepidoptera
- Family: Crambidae
- Genus: Ambia
- Species: A. naumanni

Binomial name
- Ambia naumanni Speidel & Stüning, 2005

Species of moth

Ambia naumanni is a moth in the family Crambidae. It was described by Wolfgang Speidel and Dieter Stüning in 2005. It is found in Yunnan, China.

The wingspan is 15–17 mm. Adult have been recorded on wing from mid-June to the beginning of September.
