= Ambia oligalis =

Scientific classification
- Kingdom: Animalia
- Phylum: Arthropoda
- Clade: Pancrustacea
- Class: Insecta
- Order: Lepidoptera
- Family: Crambidae
- Genus: Ambia
- Species: A. oligalis

Binomial name
- Ambia oligalis Hampson, 1906

Species of moth

Ambia oligalis is a moth in the family Crambidae. It is found on the Louisiade Islands (St. Aignan, Goodenough).

The wingspan is about 20 mm. The costa of the forewings is fuscous towards the base and there is a prominent black discoidal spot, as well as an orange postmedial line, oblique from the costa to vein 2, where it is retracted, terminating below the middle of the cell. There is a curved subterminal band expanding towards the costa and developed into a spot on the inner margin, and with a black line on its outer edge. There is also a terminal band with a black line on its inner edge. The hindwings have a black point in the middle of the cell and prominent black spots on the discocellulars and below the middle of the cell, with an oblique orange band between them. There is an obliquely curved orange postmedial band edged by fuscous lines and a terminal band with a black line on its inner side. There are also six black points on the termen, the two towards the apex with black points on the cilia beyond them.
