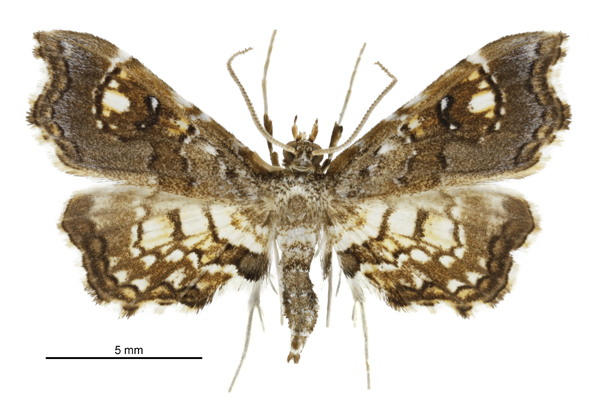
- Male
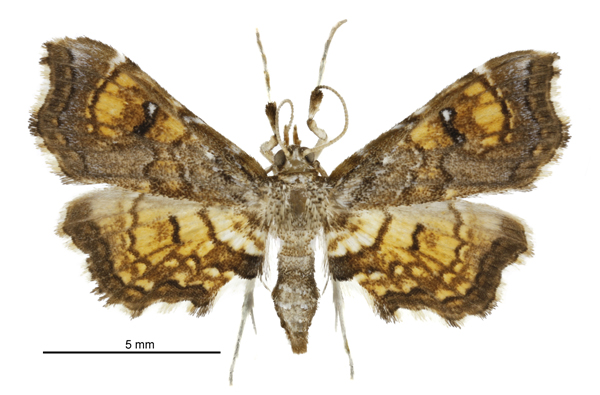
- Female

Scientific classification
- Kingdom: Animalia
- Phylum: Arthropoda
- Class: Insecta
- Order: Lepidoptera
- Family: Crambidae
- Genus: Musotima
- Species: M. aduncalis

Binomial name
- Musotima aduncalis (C. Felder, R. Felder & Rogenhofer, 1875)

Synonyms
- Diathrausta aduncalis C. Felder, R. Felder & Rogenhofer, 1875

= Musotima aduncalis =

Species of moth

Musotima aduncalis, also known as the maidenhair fairy moth, is a moth in the family Crambidae. It was described by Cajetan Felder, Rudolf Felder and Alois Friedrich Rogenhofer in 1875. This species is endemic to New Zealand.

== Description ==
The larvae are green in colour with a dark head. Adults are variable in colour, ranging from white to ochreous yellow.

== Behaviour ==
The larvae can be found on the underside of the fern fronds and create clear window like patches when consuming their host. The adult moth is on the wing from October to February.

== Hosts ==
The larvae feed on Adiantum species.
