= Ambia albomaculalis =

Scientific classification
- Kingdom: Animalia
- Phylum: Arthropoda
- Clade: Pancrustacea
- Class: Insecta
- Order: Lepidoptera
- Family: Crambidae
- Genus: Ambia
- Species: A. albomaculalis

Binomial name
- Ambia albomaculalis Hampson, 1897

Species of moth

Ambia albomaculalis is an African moth in the family Crambidae. It was described by George Hampson in 1897. The type locality is Ghana.
