= Musotima decoralis =

Scientific classification
- Kingdom: Animalia
- Phylum: Arthropoda
- Class: Insecta
- Order: Lepidoptera
- Family: Crambidae
- Genus: Musotima
- Species: M. decoralis

Binomial name
- Musotima decoralis Snellen, 1901

Species of moth

Musotima decoralis is a moth in the family Crambidae. It was described by Snellen in 1901. It is found on Java.
