= Ambia (moth) =

Scientific classification
- Kingdom: Animalia
- Phylum: Arthropoda
- Class: Insecta
- Order: Lepidoptera
- Family: Crambidae
- Subfamily: Musotiminae
- Genus: Ambia; Walker, 1859

Synonyms
- Metathyrida Viette, 1954; Metathyridia Whalley, 1964

Genus of moths

Ambia is a genus of moths of the family Crambidae.

== Species ==
- Ambia albiflavalis Hampson, 1917
- Ambia albomaculalis Hampson, 1897
- Ambia ambrealis Viette, 1960
- Ambia andasalis Viette, 1960
- Ambia anosibalis Viette, 1958
- Ambia argentifascialis Marion, 1957
- Ambia catalaianus Viette, 1954
- Ambia chalcichroalis Hampson, 1906
- Ambia chrysogramma Hampson, 1917
- Ambia colonalis Bremer, 1864
- Ambia cymophoralis Hampson, 1917
- Ambia ellipes Tams, 1935
- Ambia fulvicolor Hampson, 1917
- Ambia fusalis Hampson, 1906
- Ambia gueneealis Viette, 1957
- Ambia iambealis Walker, 1859
- Ambia locuples Butler, 1889
- Ambia magnificalis Swinhoe, 1895
- Ambia mantasoalis Viette, 1978
- Ambia marmorealis Marion & Viette, 1956
- Ambia melanalis Hampson, 1906
- Ambia melanistis Hampson, 1917
- Ambia mesoscotalis Hampson, 1906
- Ambia naumanni Speidel & Stüning, 2005
- Ambia nosivalis Viette, 1958
- Ambia novaguinensis Kenrick, 1912
- Ambia obliquistriga Rothschild, 1915
- Ambia oligalis Hampson, 1906
- Ambia pedionoma West, 1931
- Ambia phobos Viette, 1989
- Ambia pictoralis Viette, 1960
- Ambia prolalis Viette, 1958
- Ambia ptolycusalis Walker, 1859
- Ambia punctimarginata Rothschild, 1915
- Ambia schistochaeta Tams, 1935
- Ambia tendicularis Rebel, 1915
- Ambia tenebrosalis Hampson, 1896
- Ambia thyridialis Lederer, 1855
- Ambia vagilinealis Hampson, 1906
- Ambia vilisalis Viette, 1958
- Ambia xantholeuca Hampson, 1896
- Ambia yamanakai Kirpichnikova, 1999
