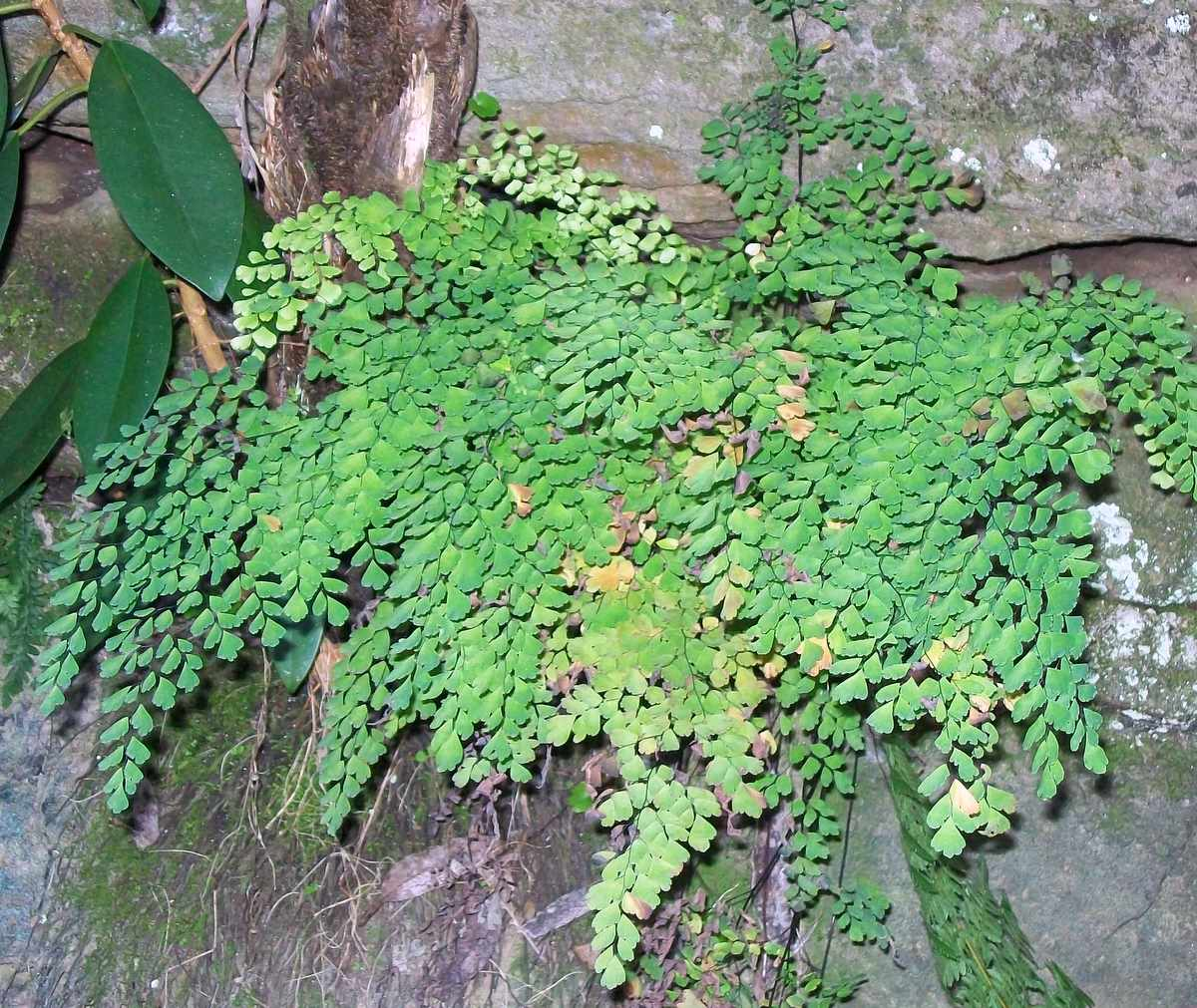
- Maidenhair fern at Ferndale Park, Chatswood West, Australia

Scientific classification
- Kingdom: Plantae
- Clade: Tracheophytes
- Division: Polypodiophyta
- Class: Polypodiopsida
- Order: Polypodiales
- Family: Pteridaceae
- Genus: Adiantum
- Species: A. aethiopicum

Binomial name
- Adiantum aethiopicum L.

Synonyms
- Adiantum assimile Sw.; Adiantum aethiopicum f. assimile (Sw.) F.M.Bailey; Adiantum trigonum Labill.

= Adiantum aethiopicum =

Maidenhair fern

Species of plant

Adiantum aethiopicum, also known as the common maidenhair fern, is a small fern of widespread distribution, occurring in Africa, Australia, Norfolk Island and New Zealand.

Adiantum aethiopicum was one of the many species first described by Linnaeus, in this case in his Systema naturae in 1759. The specific epithet aethiopicum in this sense was the Latin term for Africa south of the then known world, that is to say, more or less Africa south of Egypt. In South Africa the species occurs widely, though not generally profusely, mainly on moist sandstone cliffs in full shade. In the Cape Peninsula it is uncommon and grows mainly at the highest locally available altitudes, generally about 600–1,085 m (2,000–3,600 ft).

Adiantum aethiopicum grows in spreading clumps of fronds from 10 to 45 cm (4 to 18 in) in height. The rhizomes are wiry and branched. The fronds are horizontal and layered, or upright. They are divided into two or three and have many small wedge-shaped segments, each of which has sori along its margins underneath.

A common plant, often seen growing in moist areas. In Australia it is found near by creeks or in open forest, where it may form a large colony.

The 1889 book 'The Useful Native Plants of Australia’ records that "This plant is said to possess medicinal properties, being slightly astringent and emetic. It has been used in Europe in making "Sirop de Capt'llaire," a demulcent drink, employed in diseases of the chest."

== Cultivation ==
Adiantum aethiopicum is a popular and well known ornamental plant. Propagation is from plant division or by spores. In cultivation the Maidenhair fern prefers a well-lit situation inside, but a shady place outdoors without draughts. It is suitable for terrariums and hanging baskets. It is fairly easy to grow, and will flourish in moist garden soil or potting mix.
