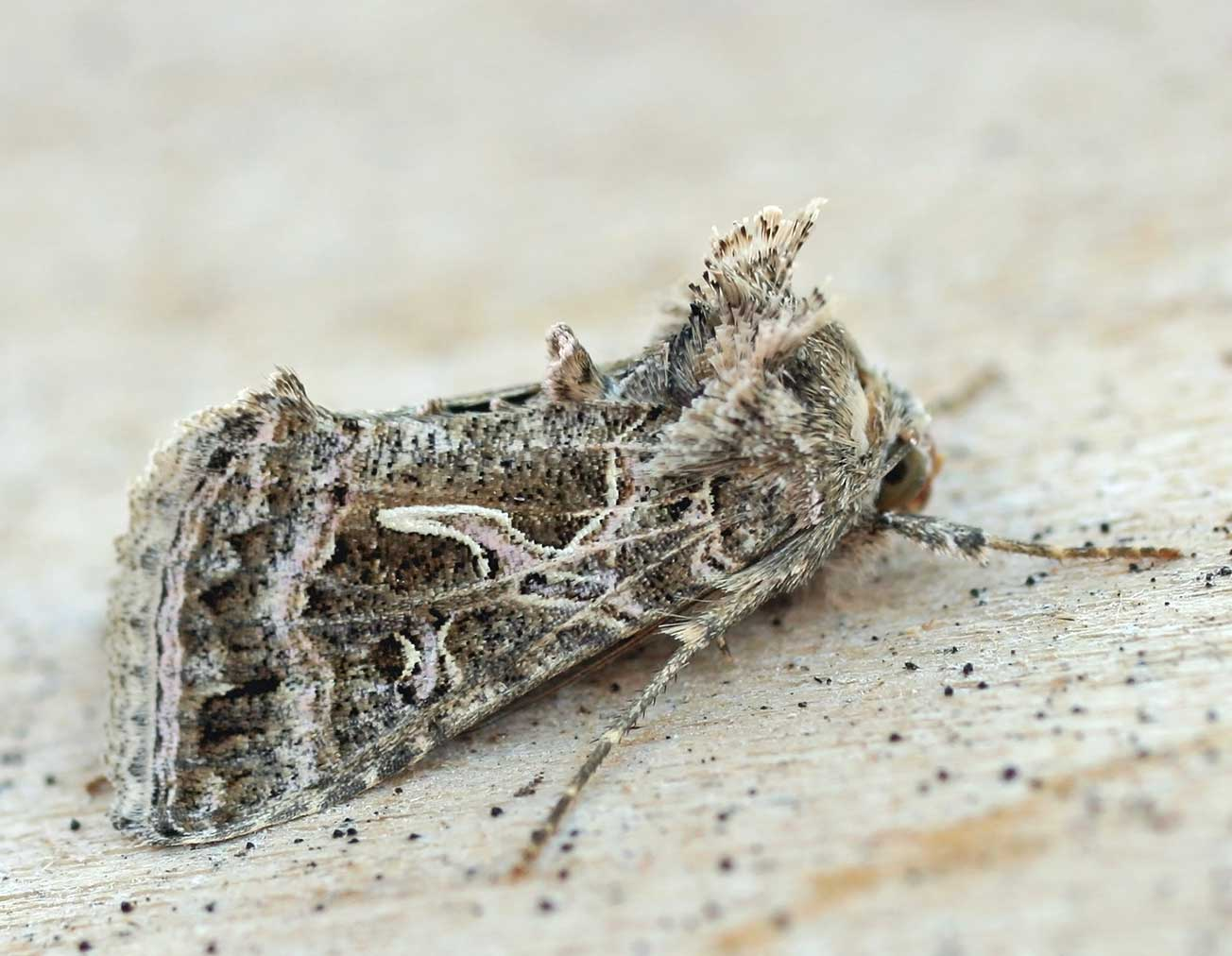

Scientific classification
- Domain: Eukaryota
- Kingdom: Animalia
- Phylum: Arthropoda
- Class: Insecta
- Order: Lepidoptera
- Superfamily: Noctuoidea
- Family: Noctuidae
- Genus: Thysanoplusia
- Species: T. daubei

Binomial name
- Thysanoplusia daubei (Boisduval, 1840)

Synonyms
- Plusia daubei; Plusia ciliaris Walker, [1858]; Daubeplusia daubei

= Thysanoplusia daubei =

Species of moth

Thysanoplusia daubei is a moth of the family Noctuidae. It is found in North and East Africa, Southern Europe, Arabia, Turkey, Southern Iran to the Himalayas, India, Indochina, China, Japan and Taiwan.

== Description ==
The wingspan of the moths is 27 to 31 millimeters. The forewings are dark grey-brown to reddish-brown colouring. The lower midfield is darkened. A characteristic silver-white sign, for example in the form of the letter Gamma from the Greek alphabet, stands out. This gamma sign is stretched and often filled with pink. The outer transverse line is lightly bordered on both sides, the wavy line is strongly jagged. The hind wings are pale brownish, slightly darkened at the edge. The thorax is furry hairy and has a few tufts of hair, the proboscis is well developed.

== Similar species ==
Trichoplusia ni is distinguished by longer wings and a much smaller and often interrupted gamma sign.

== Taxonomy ==
The closest relatives of T.daubei are the Afrotropical Thysanoplusia indicator and the South-East Asiatic Thysanoplusia lectula which is larger in size.(Walker, 1858)

== Biology ==
The larvae feed on Sonchus, Chondrilla, Cichorium and Mentha species.
