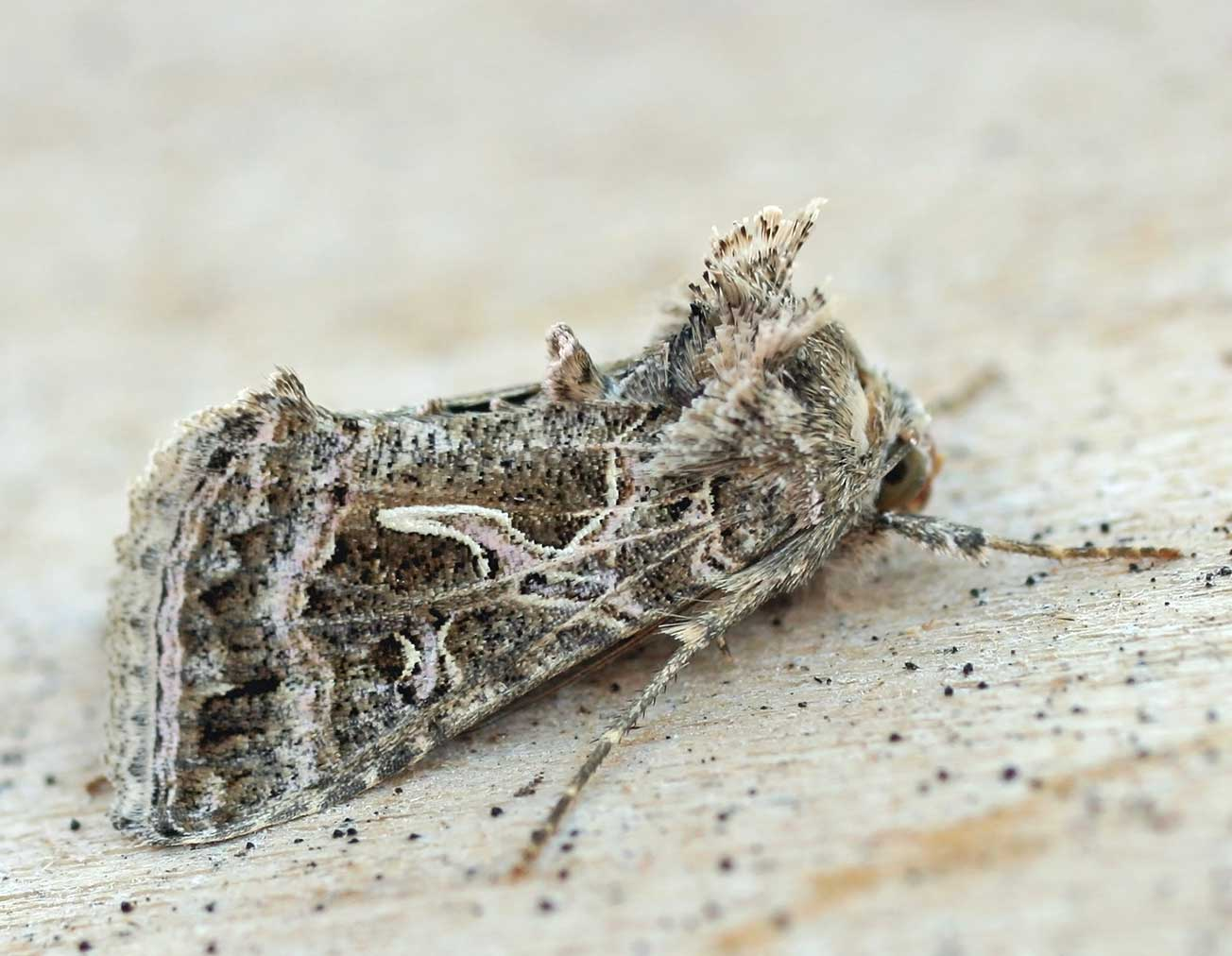
- Thysanoplusia daubei

Scientific classification
- Domain: Eukaryota
- Kingdom: Animalia
- Phylum: Arthropoda
- Class: Insecta
- Order: Lepidoptera
- Superfamily: Noctuoidea
- Family: Noctuidae
- Tribe: Argyrogrammatini
- Genus: Thysanoplusia; Ichinosé, 1973

= Thysanoplusia =

Genus of moths

Thysanoplusia is a genus of moths of the family Noctuidae described by Taira Ichinosé in 1973.

== Species ==
- Thysanoplusia ablusa Felder, 1874
- Thysanoplusia acosmia Dufay, 1972
- Thysanoplusia anargyra Guenée, 1852
- Thysanoplusia angulum Guenée, 1852
- Thysanoplusia asapheia Dufay, 1977
- Thysanoplusia aspila Dufay, 1972
- Thysanoplusia aureopicta Ronkay & Behounek, 1996
- Thysanoplusia bipartita Snellen, 1880
- Thysanoplusia brechlini Ronkay & Behounek, 1999
- Thysanoplusia capnista Dufay, 1972
- Thysanoplusia cernyi Ronkay & Behounek, 1999
- Thysanoplusia chalcedona Hampson, 1902
- Thysanoplusia circumscripta Freyer, 1831
- Thysanoplusia clarci Hampson, 1910
- Thysanoplusia cupreomicans (Hampson, 1909)
- Thysanoplusia daubei Boisduval, 1840
- Thysanoplusia distalagma Hampson, 1913
- Thysanoplusia dolera Dufay, 1977
- Thysanoplusia eikeikei Bethune-Baker, 1906
- Thysanoplusia eutheia Dufay, 1972
- Thysanoplusia exquisita Felder, 1874
- Thysanoplusia flavirosea Dufay, 1972
- Thysanoplusia florina Guenée, 1852
- Thysanoplusia hemichalcea Hampson, 1913
- Thysanoplusia homoia Dufay, 1968
- Thysanoplusia ignescens Dufay, 1968
- Thysanoplusia ignicollis Dufay, 1968
- Thysanoplusia indicator Walker, [1858]
- Thysanoplusia intermixta Warren, 1913
- Thysanoplusia jonesi Ronkay & Behounek, 1996
- Thysanoplusia laportei Dufay, 1972
- Thysanoplusia mulunga Dufay, 1972
- Thysanoplusia nyei Dufay, 1972
- Thysanoplusia orichalcea Fabricius, 1775 - slender burnished brass
- Thysanoplusia rectilinea Wallengren, 1856
- Thysanoplusia reticulata Moore, 1882
- Thysanoplusia rostrata D. S. Fletcher, 1963
- Thysanoplusia semirosea Dufay, 1968
- Thysanoplusia sestertia (Felder & Rogenhofer, 1874)
- Thysanoplusia spoliata Walker, [1858]
- Thysanoplusia tetrastigma (Hampson, 1910)
- Thysanoplusia turlini Dufay, 1978
- Thysanoplusia viettei Dufay, 1968
- Thysanoplusia violascens Hampson, 1913
