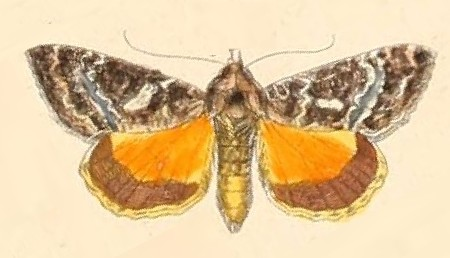

Scientific classification
- Domain: Eukaryota
- Kingdom: Animalia
- Phylum: Arthropoda
- Class: Insecta
- Order: Lepidoptera
- Superfamily: Noctuoidea
- Family: Noctuidae
- Genus: Thysanoplusia
- Species: T. exquisita

Binomial name
- Thysanoplusia exquisita (Felder & Rogenhofer, 1874)

Synonyms
- Plusia exquisita Felder & Rogenhofer, 1874

= Thysanoplusia exquisita =

Species of moth

Thysanoplusia exquisita is a moth of the family Noctuidae. it is found in southern Africa, from Angola to Madagascar and South Africa, as well as in Oman, Afghanistan, Iran and Pakistan.

== Biology ==
Known hostplants of the larvae of this species are Asteraceae (Senecio bupleuroides and Euryops spathaceus)
