= Trichoplusia obtusisigna =

Scientific classification
- Kingdom: Animalia
- Phylum: Arthropoda
- Class: Insecta
- Order: Lepidoptera
- Superfamily: Noctuoidea
- Family: Noctuidae
- Genus: Trichoplusia
- Species: T. obtusisigna

Binomial name
- Trichoplusia obtusisigna Walker, 1857

Species of moth

Trichoplusia obtusisigna is a moth of the family Noctuidae.
