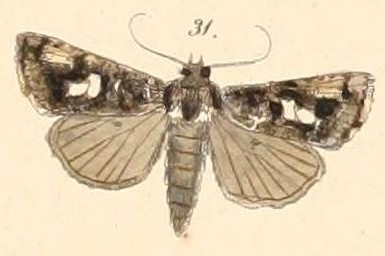

Scientific classification
- Domain: Eukaryota
- Kingdom: Animalia
- Phylum: Arthropoda
- Class: Insecta
- Order: Lepidoptera
- Superfamily: Noctuoidea
- Family: Noctuidae
- Genus: Thysanoplusia
- Species: T. sestertia

Binomial name
- Thysanoplusia sestertia (Felder & Rogenhofer, 1874)

Synonyms
- Plusia sestertia Felder & Rogenhofer, 1874; Plusia mapongua Holland, 1894

= Thysanoplusia sestertia =

Species of moth

Thysanoplusia sestertia is a moth of the family Noctuidae. it is found in Africa, where it is known from Gabon, Kenya, South Africa and Uganda, as well as from Saudi Arabia and Yemen.
