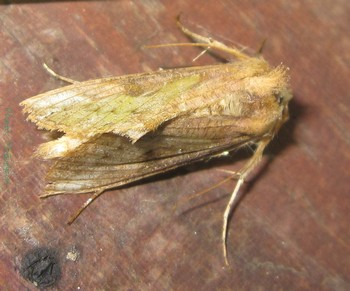
- Trichoplusia orichalcea

Scientific classification
- Domain: Eukaryota
- Kingdom: Animalia
- Phylum: Arthropoda
- Class: Insecta
- Order: Lepidoptera
- Superfamily: Noctuoidea
- Family: Noctuidae
- Tribe: Argyrogrammatini
- Genus: Trichoplusia; McDunnough, 1944

= Trichoplusia =

Genus of moths

Trichoplusia is a genus of moths of the family Noctuidae.

== Species ==
- Trichoplusia arachnoides Distant, 1901
- Trichoplusia aranea Hampson, 1909
- Trichoplusia callista Dufay, 1972
- Trichoplusia cinnabarina Dufay, 1972
- Trichoplusia cupreomicans Hampson, 1909
- Trichoplusia elacheia Dufay, 1972
- Trichoplusia epicharis Dufay, 1972
- Trichoplusia glyceia Dufay, 1972
- Trichoplusia gromieri Dufay, 1975
- Trichoplusia lectula (Walker, 1858)
- Trichoplusia lampra Dufay, 1968
- Trichoplusia ni – Cabbage Looper (Hübner, [1803])
- Trichoplusia obtusisigna Walker, 1858
- Trichoplusia orichalcea (Fabricius, 1775)
- Trichoplusia photeina Dufay, 1972
- Trichoplusia roseofasciata Carcasson, 1965
- Trichoplusia sestertia Felder, 1874
- Trichoplusia sogai Dufay, 1968
- Trichoplusia telaugea Dufay, 1972
- Trichoplusia tetrastigma Hampson, 1910
