= Trichoplusia circumscripta =

Scientific classification
- Domain: Eukaryota
- Kingdom: Animalia
- Phylum: Arthropoda
- Class: Insecta
- Order: Lepidoptera
- Superfamily: Noctuoidea
- Family: Noctuidae
- Genus: Trichoplusia
- Species: T. circumscripta

Binomial name
- Trichoplusia circumscripta (Freyer, 1831)

Synonyms
- Thysanoplusia circumscripta (Freyer, 1831); Plusia circumscripta Freyer, 1831

Species of moth

Trichoplusia circumscripta is a moth of the family Noctuidae. It is found in the eastern part of the Mediterranean Basin and parts of the Near East and the Middle East. It has been recorded in all the Levant countries. The species is invasive in Egypt.

Adults are on wing year round. There is probably one generation per year.
