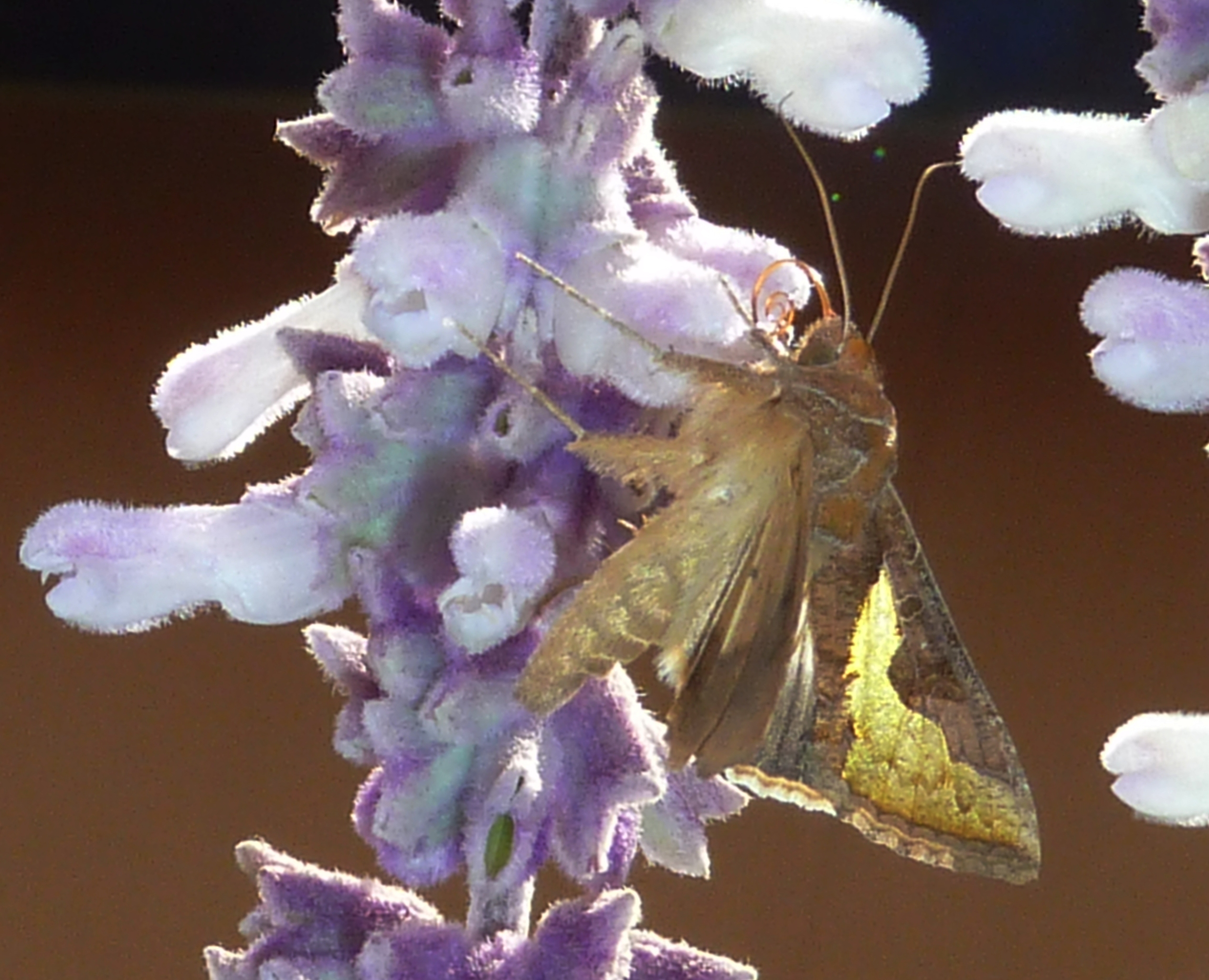
- Adult feeding on Salvia nectar
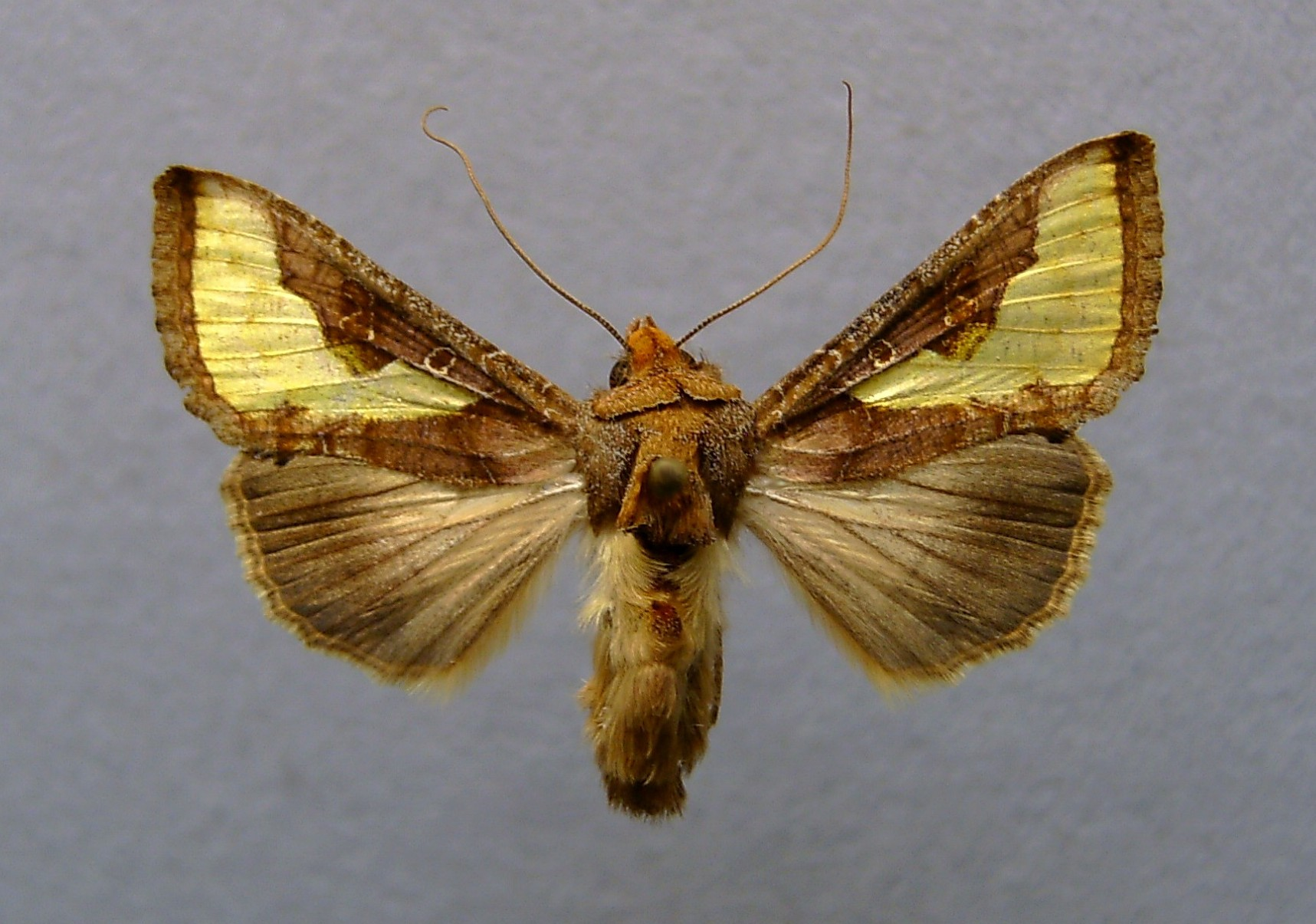
- Mounted adult

Scientific classification
- Kingdom: Animalia
- Phylum: Arthropoda
- Class: Insecta
- Order: Lepidoptera
- Superfamily: Noctuoidea
- Family: Noctuidae
- Genus: Thysanoplusia
- Species: T. orichalcea

Binomial name
- Thysanoplusia orichalcea (Fabricius, 1775)

Synonyms
- Noctua orichalcea Fabricius, 1775; Trichoplusia orichalcea; Thysanoplusia chrysitina Martyn, 1797; Thysanoplusia aurifera Hübner, [1813]

= Thysanoplusia orichalcea =

Slender burnished brass

Species of moth

Thysanoplusia orichalcea, the slender burnished brass, is a moth of the family Noctuidae. The species was first described by Johan Christian Fabricius in 1775. It is a polyphagous pest of vegetable crops that originated in Indonesia, from where it spread to Europe, South Asia, India, Sri Lanka, Africa, Australia and New Zealand. In northern Europe it is a migrant species.

== Description ==
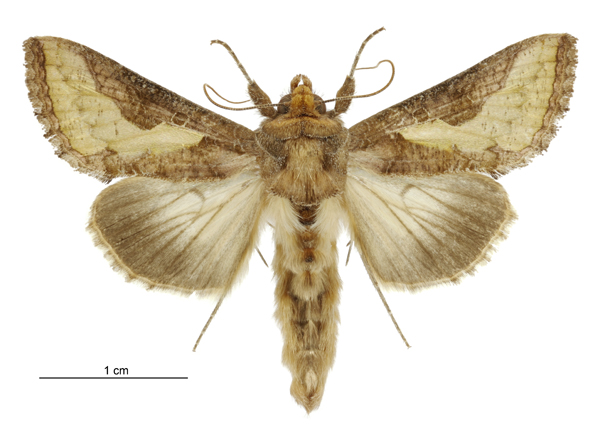
Male

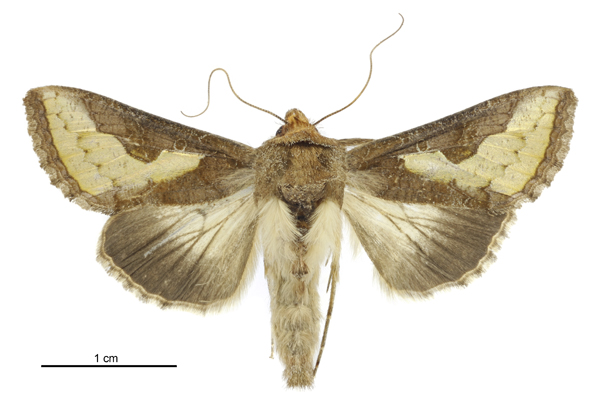
Female

The wingspan is 36–44 mm. Its head, collar and the vertex of its head are reddish orange. Tegulae and forewings pale reddish brown. The forewings are extensively covered with a metallic golden shimmering surface. Only the costal field and hem are brown. Sub-basal, antemedial and postmedial waved lines very indistinct, fine and whitish in colour. The sub-marginal line irregularly lunulate. The reniform and orbicular stains are small and white bordered. The unpatterned hindwings are grey brown, somewhat darker at the margin. The thorax is furry and with some hair tufts, the proboscis is well developed.

Larva bluish green with a few short dorsal hairs. There are slender dorsal white lines and a prominent lateral line.

== Ecology ==
The moth flies from August to October, depending on the location.

The larvae feed on various herbaceous plants, including crops such as sunflower, Coreopsis, potato and soybean. In managing their population, phenylacetaldehyde, a volatile floral compound attractive to many Lepidoptera and present in Canada thistle (Cirsium arvense), was found to be effective in trapping especially the females of the species.

== Gallery ==
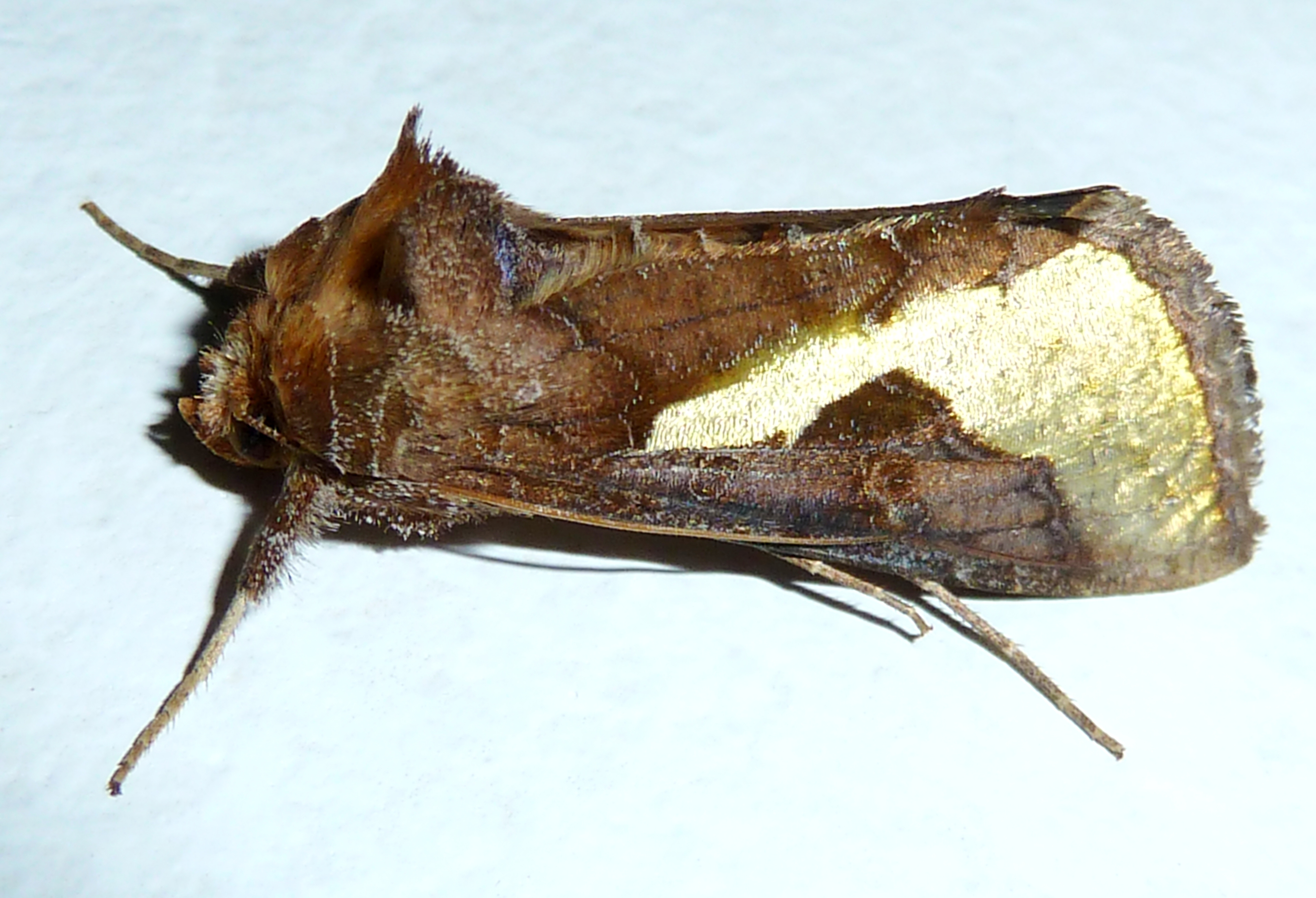
Strong golden wing iridescence as revealed in favourable illumination

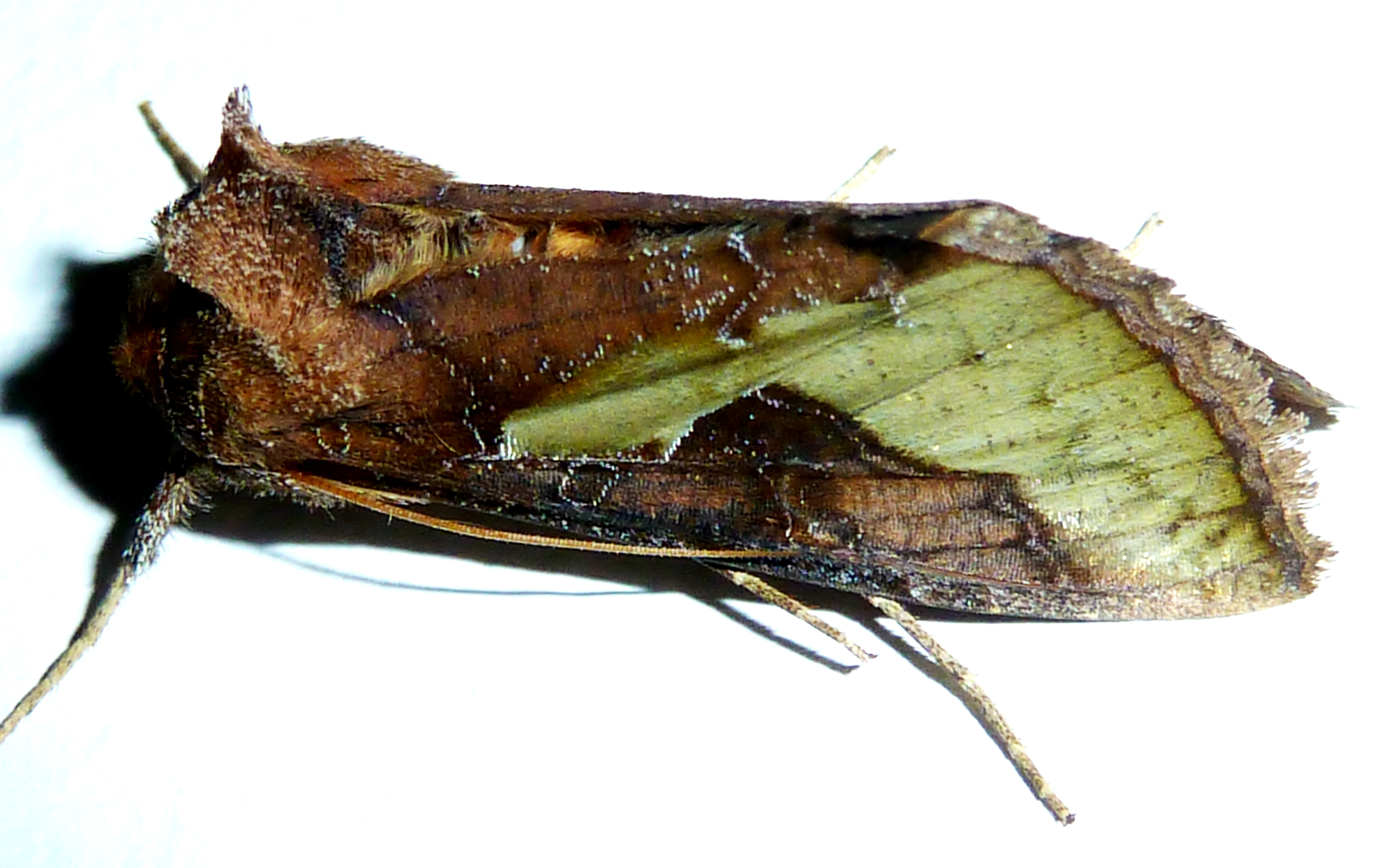
Illuminated from a different angle

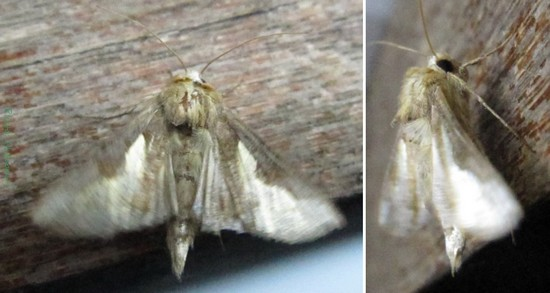

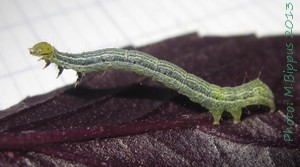
