= Trichoplusia lectula =

Scientific classification
- Kingdom: Animalia
- Phylum: Arthropoda
- Clade: Pancrustacea
- Class: Insecta
- Order: Lepidoptera
- Superfamily: Noctuoidea
- Family: Noctuidae
- Genus: Trichoplusia
- Species: T. lectula

Binomial name
- Trichoplusia lectula (Walker, 1858)

Synonyms
- Prodenia lectula Walker, 1858; Thysanoplusia lectula (Walker, 1858); Plusia kalitura R. Felder & Rogenhofer, 1874; Argyrogramma longisigna Chou & Lu, 1979

Species of moth

Trichoplusia lectula is a moth of the family Noctuidae first described by Francis Walker in 1858. It is found throughout Asia, including the Indian subregion, Sri Lanka, Thailand, Borneo, Java, and Japan, as well as Western Australia and Queensland.

== Description ==
Its wingspan is about 28 mm. Palpi with a short third joint. The hind femur of the male is not tufted with long hair. The head and thorax are dark reddish brown and greyish. Abdomen pale. Forewings are dark red brown and purplish gray. An antemedial rufous line and a broad white streak are found along the median nervure and vein 2 as far as the postmedial line, which is bent outwards at vein 5, where a large red-brown patch can be seen above the streak. Reniform, greyish with white lines on its inner and outer angles. Some reddish brown submarginal dentate marks were found with a white streak below those near the apex. A rufous submarginal line along with two fine marginal lines and a white line through the cilia can be seen. Hindwings are pale fuscous.

The larvae feed on Mentha species.
