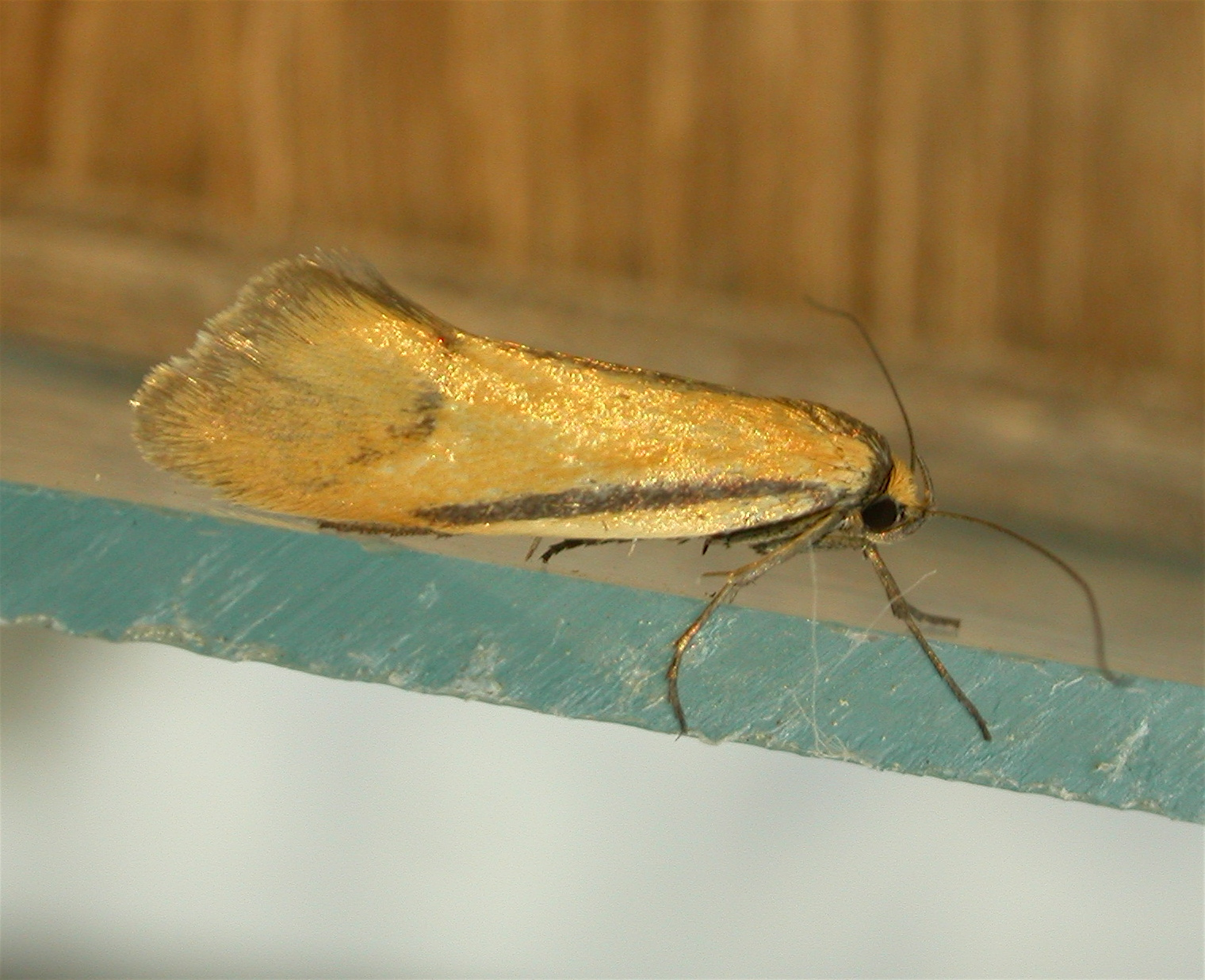
- Adult Philobota arabella or a related species, Aranda, Australia

Scientific classification
- Kingdom: Animalia
- Phylum: Arthropoda
- Clade: Pancrustacea
- Class: Insecta
- Order: Lepidoptera
- Family: Oecophoridae
- Subfamily: Oecophorinae; Bruand, 1851

Genera
- Numerous, see text

Synonyms
- Enicostominae Heslop, 1938; Poeciloptina Herrich-Schäffer, 1857; Ashinagidae Matsumura, 1929; Aecophoridae Bruand, [1851]; Dasyceridae Meyrick, 1883; Philobotides Meyrick, 1906; Eulechriades Meyrick, 1906; Metachandidae Meyrick, 1911; Herrichiinae Toll, 1964

= Oecophorinae =

Subfamily of the "concealer moths" family Oecophoridae

The Oecophorinae are the nominate subfamily of moths in the concealer moth family (Oecophoridae). They are part of the insufficiently studied superfamily Gelechioidea, and like their relatives, the circumscription of this taxon is disputed. Numerous attempts have been made to divide the subfamily into tribes, but no robust evolutionary scenario has been established. The placement of few genera is completely certain, and new genera are frequently described.

== History of classification ==
In some approaches, the Oecophoridae are expanded to include several lineages formerly placed in the Elachistidae or considered independent gelechioid families. As regards the Oecophorinae, the proposed concealer moth subfamilies Chimabachinae, Deuterogoniinae, Peleopodinae and Philobotinae were included here pending further study of the affiliations of their genera. They were also often treated as independent families (Chimabachidae, Deuterogoniidae, Peleopodidae and Philobotidae) by those who followed a "splitting" approach. In general, the delimitation of the Oecophorinae versus the Amphisbatinae, Depressariinae and Hypertrophinae has been the most contested issue, though the uncertain placement of the Xyloryctidae versus the concealer moths (into which they might belong as subfamily) has also been a considerable stumbling block.

Numerous attempts have been made to divide the Oecophorinae into tribes, such as Carcinini, Crossotocerini, Denisiini, Herrichini, Oecophorini, Peleopodini and Pleurotini. Also placed here under this scheme are the Cacochroini and Orophiini, which otherwise were included in the Depressariinae (but usually only when these were elevated to full family rank). Most of the proposed tribes were based on phenetic or qualitative analyses, if not merely on the whim of the entomologists that established them, and no robust evolutionary scenario has been established for the different lineages of Oecophorinae. The groups around the genus Peleopoda (the former Peleopodinae) and of course the type genus Oecophora are generally recognized to be well distinguished from each other, but no satisfying arrangement has been found for the bulk of the (presumed) oecophorine genera. Hence, no subdivision into tribes is attempted here.

== Taxonomy and systematics ==
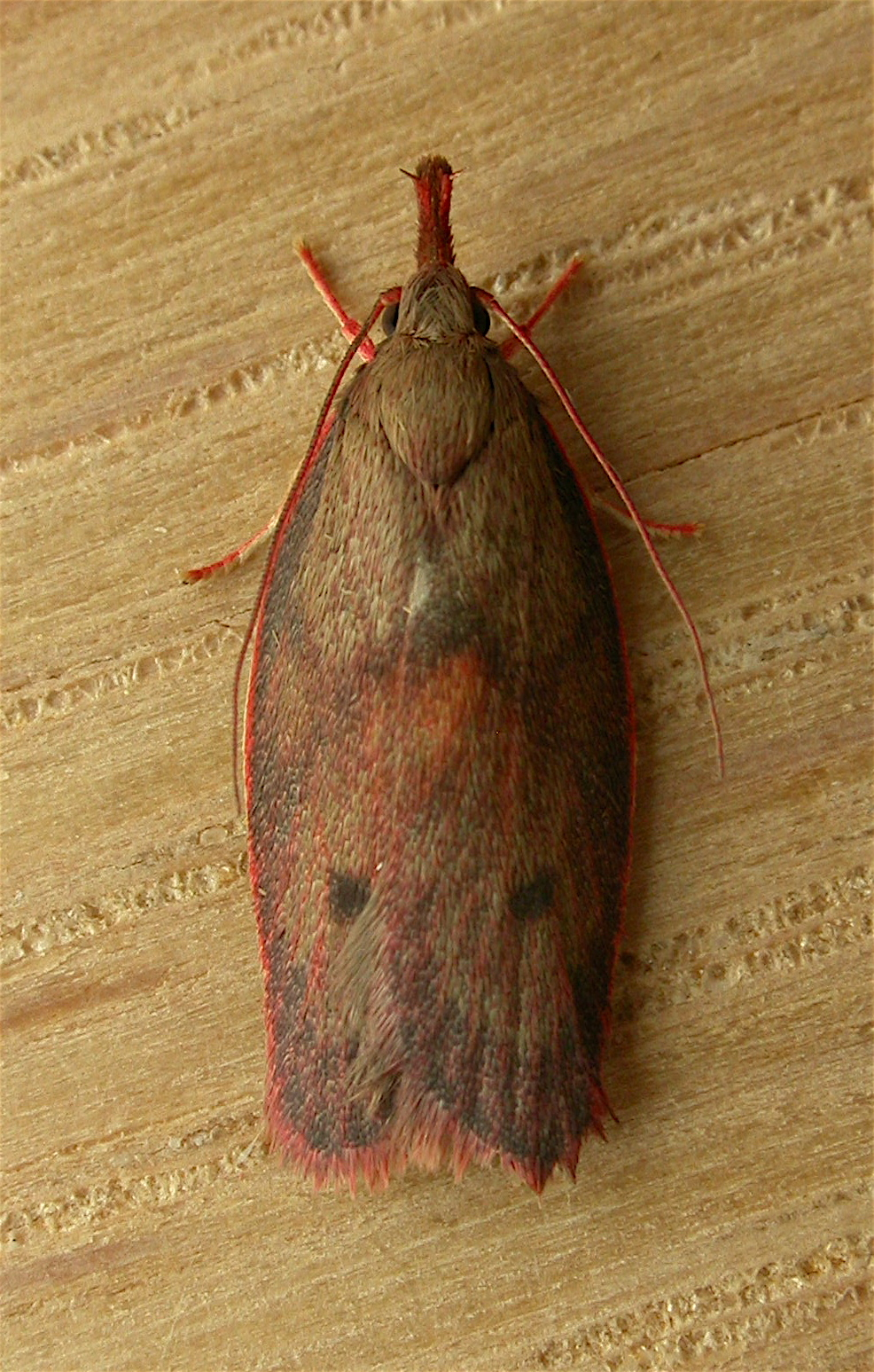
Adult of an unidentified Enchocrates species, Aranda, Australia

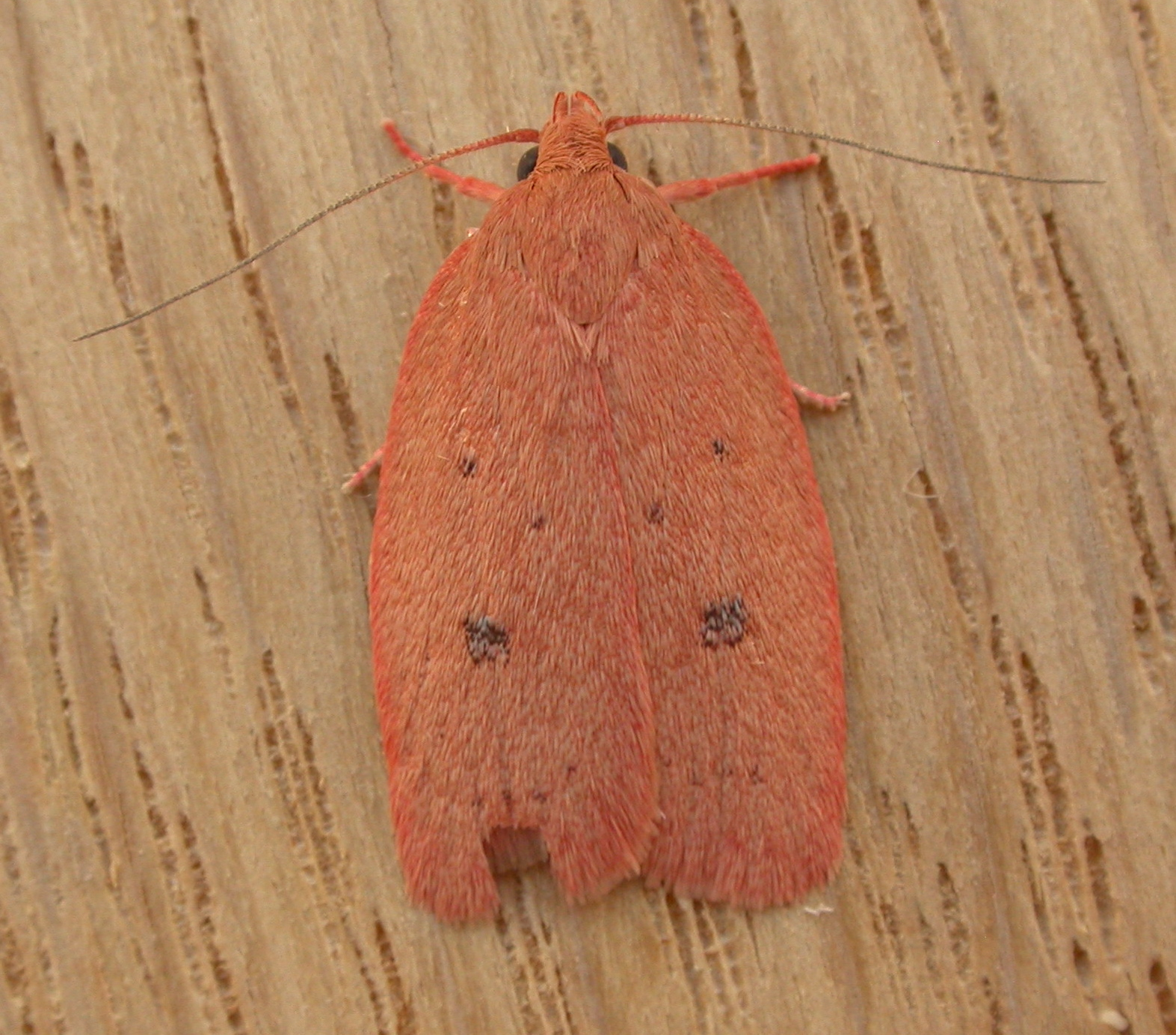
Adult Garrha pudica, Aranda, Australia

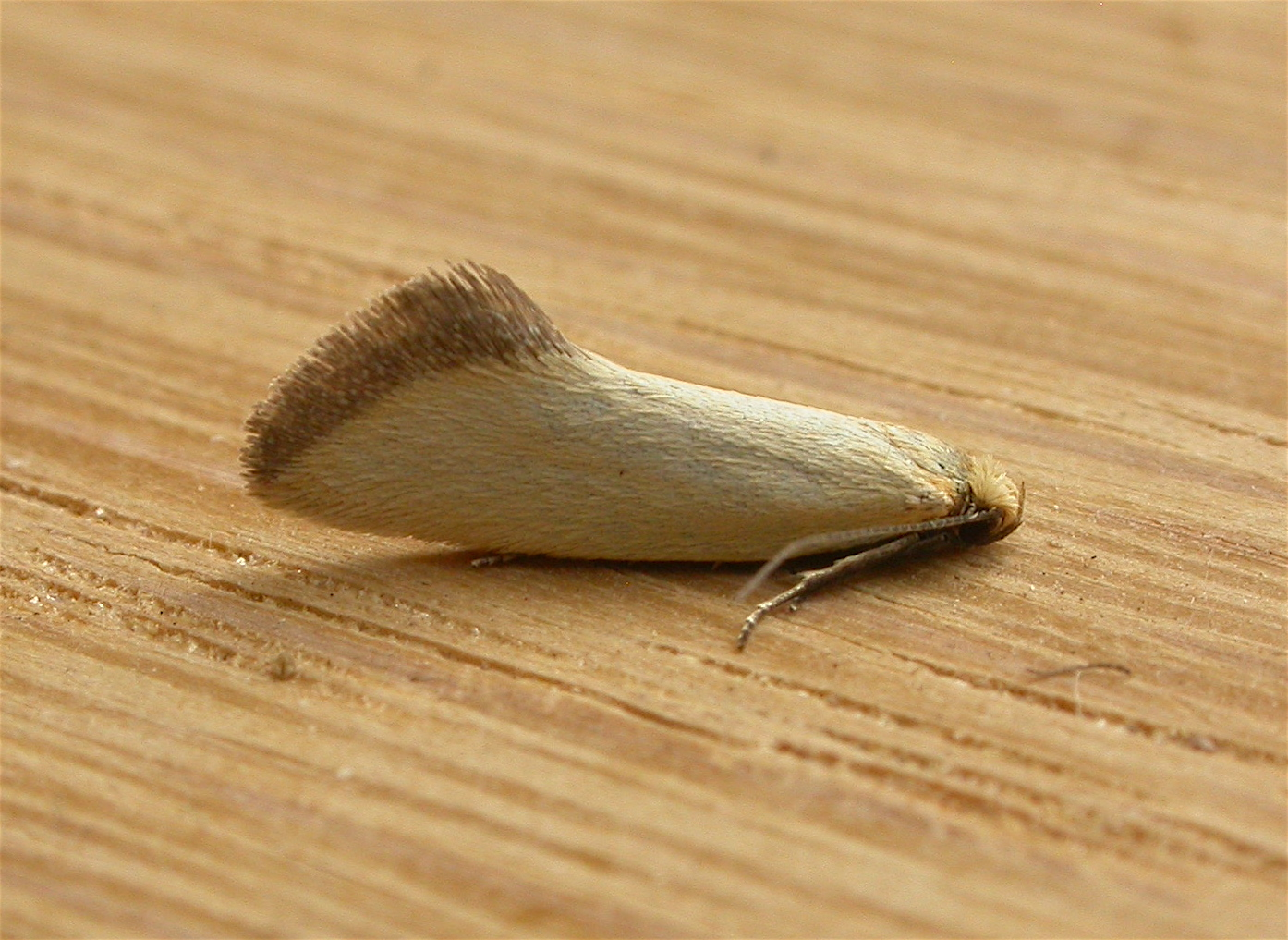
Adult of a newly discovered Microbela species, Aranda, Australia

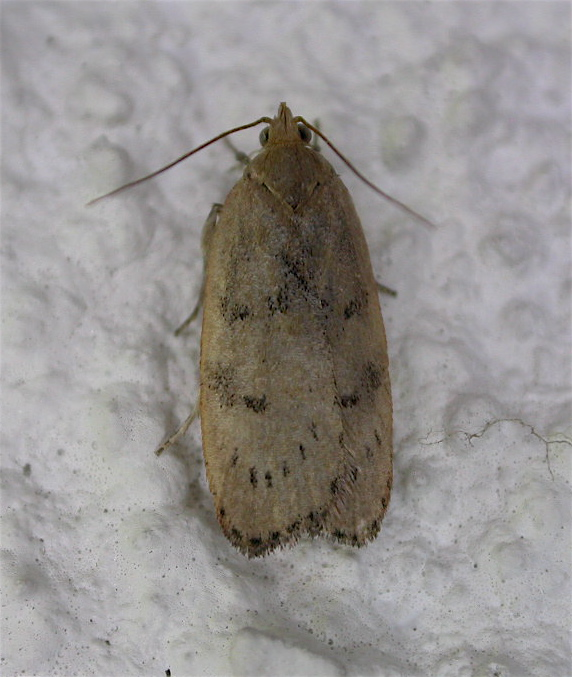
Adult male Phaeosaces coarctatella, Browns Bay, New Zealand

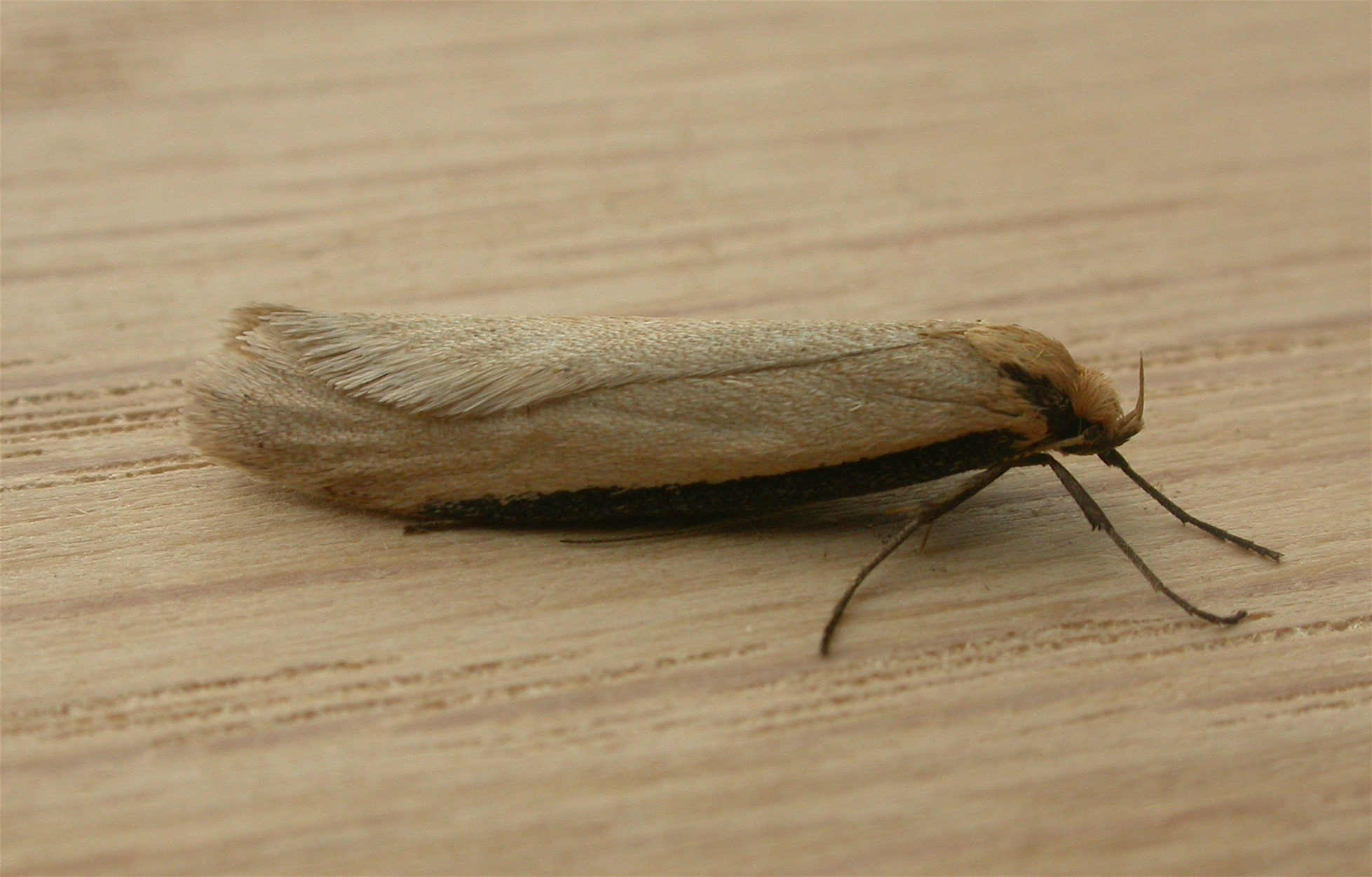
Adult of a newly discovered Philobota species related to P. mathematica, Aranda, Australia

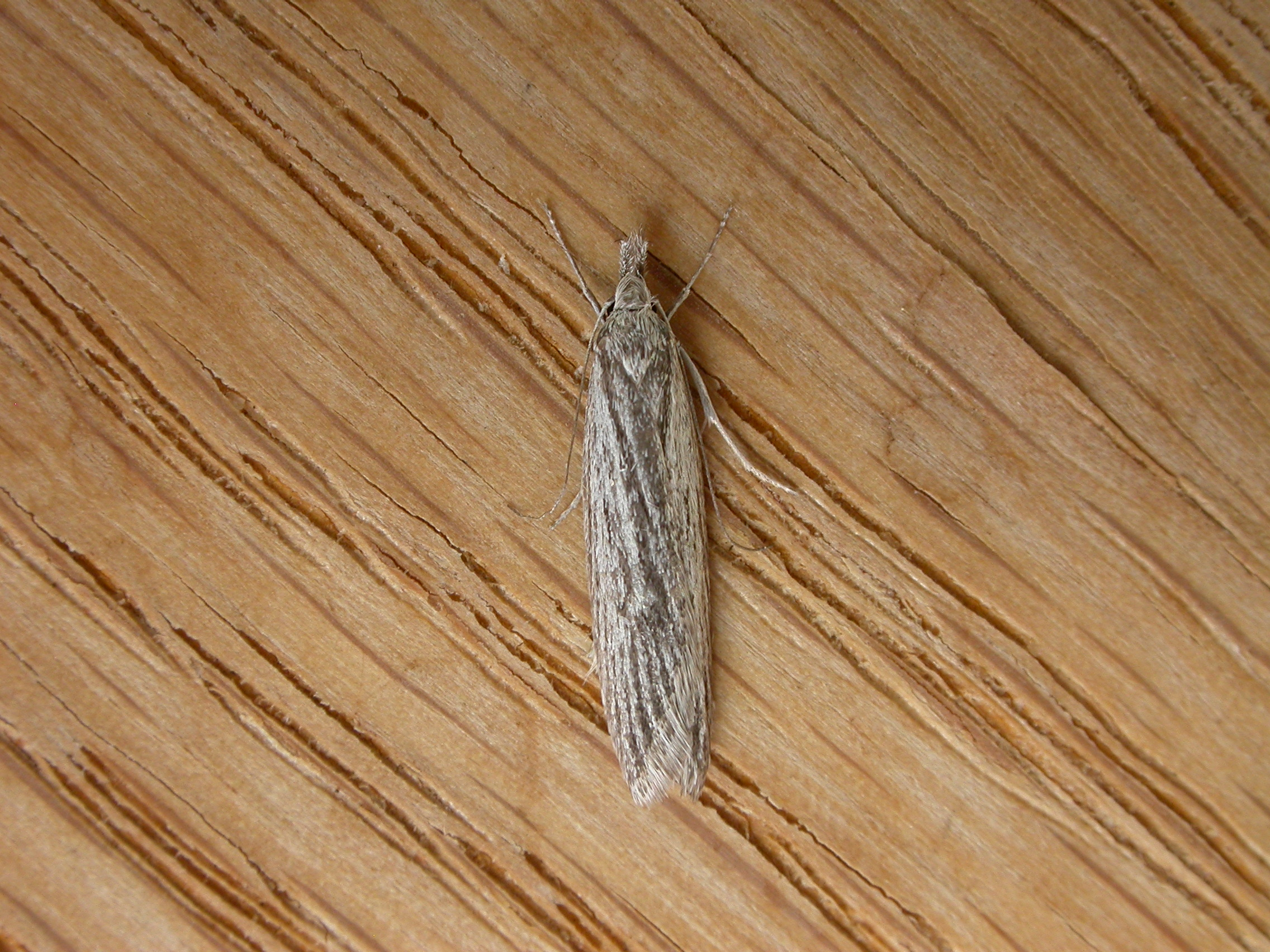
Phryganeutis cinerea, Aranda, Australia

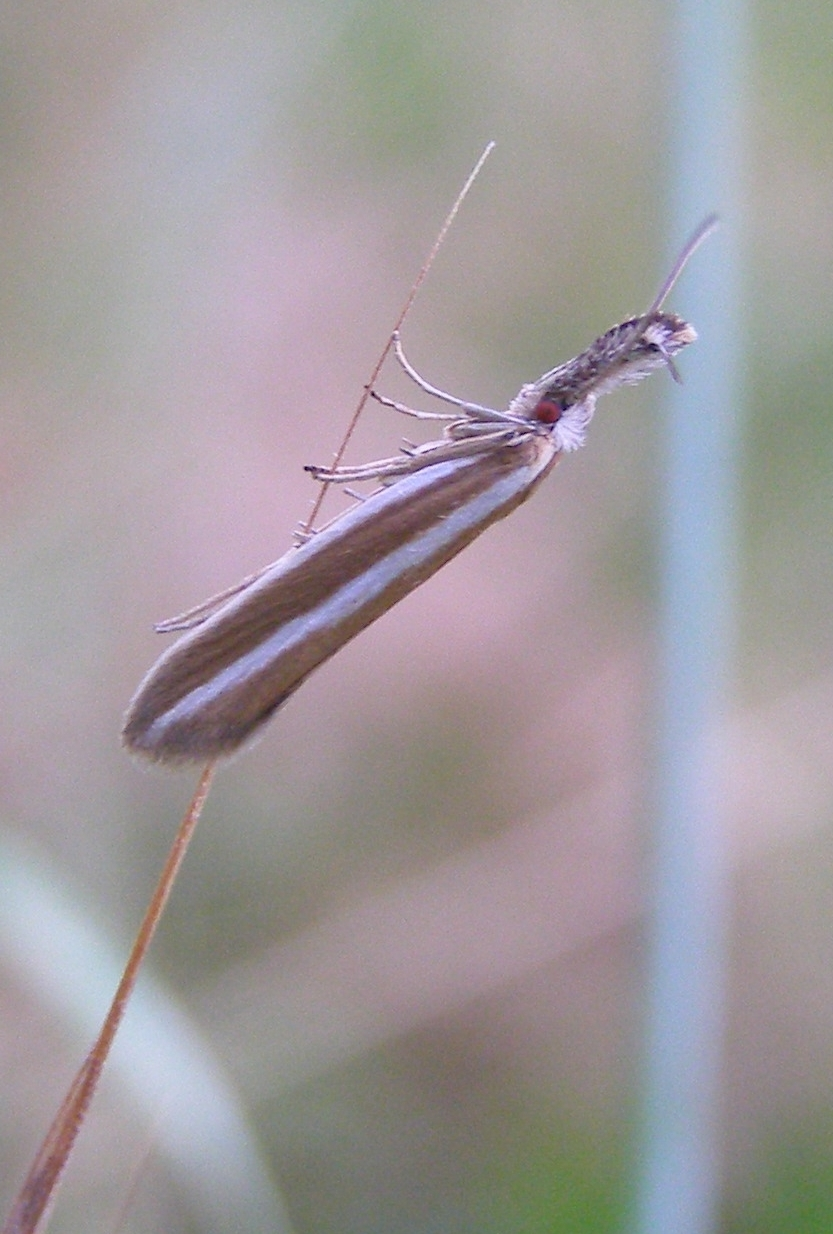
Adult Pleurota aristella

The following genera are usually held to belong to the Oecophorinae. Still, placement of few genera is completely certain (see above), and many – in particular monotypic genera – may not be valid at all. New oecophorine genera are also being described frequently:

=== Tribe Oecophorini ===
- Bisigna Toll, 1956
- Brymblia Hodges, 1974
- Dafa Hodges, 1974
- Fabiola Busck, 1908
- Endrosis Hübner, [1825]
- Hofmannophila Spuler, 1910
- Schiffermuelleria Hübner, [1825]
- Buvatina Leraut, 1984
- Denisia Hübner, [1825]
- Eratophyes Diakonoff, 1975
- Goidanichiana Agenjo, 1977
- Decantha Busck, 1908
- Inga Busck, 1908
- Metalampra Toll, 1956
- Eido Chambers, 1873
- Carolana Clarke, 1941
- Borkhausenia Hübner, [1825]
- Herrichia Staudinger, 1871
- Kasyniana Vives, 1986
- Crassa Bruand, 1851
- Batia Stephens, 1834
- Epicallima Dyar, [1903]
- Esperia Hübner, [1825]
- Polix Hodges, 1974
- Mathildana Clarke, 1941
- Oecophora Latreille, [1796]
- Alabonia Hübner, [1825]
- Harpella Schrank, 1802
- Cyphacma Meyrick, 1915
- Callimodes Leraut, 1989
- Dasycera Stephens, 1829
- Paradasycera Lvovsky & Sinev, 2011
- Pseudocryptolechia Lvovsky, 2001
- Ymeldia Hodges, 1965

=== Tribe Metachandini Meyrick, 1911 ===
- Metachanda Meyrick, 1911

=== Tribe Crossotocerini Lvovsky, 2002 ===
- Crossotocera Zerny in Wagner, 1930

=== Tribe Periacmini Lvovsky, 2005 ===
- Periacma Meyrick, 1894
- Irepacma Moriuti, Saito & Lewvanich, 1985
- Ripeacma Moriuti, Saito & Lewvanich, 1985
- Epiracma Wang & Li, 2005

=== Unplaced ===
- Abychodes Viette, 1954
- Acartophila Meyrick, 1922
- Achyrostola Meyrick, 1921
- Acriotes Diakonoff, 1954
- Acmotoma Common, 1994
- Aechmioides Bruand, 1851
- Aeolernis Meyrick, 1914
- Agrioplecta Meyrick in Caradja & Meyrick, 1935
- Agroecodes Meyrick, 1937
- Aidabella Urra, 2014
- Aliciana Clarke, 1978
- Alomenarcha Meyrick, 1930
- Altiura Clarke, 1978
- Alynda Clarke, 1978
- Amphipseustis Meyrick, 1921
- Amseloecia Povolný, 1983
- Anacathartis Meyrick, 1927
- Anacoemastis Meyrick, 1914
- Ancylometis Meyrick, 1887
- Aniuta Clarke, 1978
- Arctopoda Butler, 1883
- Arctoscelis Meyrick, 1894
- Areocosma Meyrick, 1917
- Ashinaga Matsumura, 1929
- Astiarcha Meyrick, 1914
- Atha Clarke, 1978
- Atopophrictis Meyrick, 1920
- Atopotorna Meyrick, 1932
- Aulotropha Meyrick, 1918
- Beforona Viette, 1956
- Bigotianella Legrand, 1965
- Briarostoma Meyrick, 1920
- Calliphractis Meyrick, 1928
- Cecidolechia Kieffer & Jörgensen, 1910
- Cenarchis Meyrick, 1924
- Ceranthes Meyrick, 1918
- Chalcorectis Meyrick, 1937
- Chanystis Meyrick, 1911
- Choronoma Meyrick, 1926
- Colpomorpha Meyrick, 1929
- Compsistis Meyrick, 1888
- Corita Clarke, 1978
- Crystallogenes Meyrick, 1937
- Deia Clarke, 1978
- Delonoma Meyrick, 1914
- Delosaphes Meyrick in Caradja & Meyrick, 1938
- Despina Clarke, 1978
- Diocosma Meyrick, 1909
- Diploclasis Diakonoff, [1968]
- Dita Clarke, 1978
- Doliotechna Meyrick, 1914
- Doxomeres Meyrick, 1917
- Dysgnorima Zeller, 1877
- Eclactistis Meyrick, 1913
- Elaphrerga Meyrick, 1922
- Eomichla Meyrick, 1916
- Eonympha Meyrick, 1906
- Epimecyntis Meyrick, 1924
- Epiphractis Meyrick, 1908
- Eraina Clarke, 1978
- Erotis Meyrick, 1910
- Eucleodora Walsingham, 1881
- Euhylecoetes Diakonoff, 1954
- Euzelotica Diakonoff, 1954
- Exosphrantis Meyrick, 1931
- Formokamaga Matsumura, 1931
- Gildita Beéche, 2014
- Glorita Urra, 2013
- Goniorrhostis Meyrick in de Joannis, 1930
- Halimarmara Meyrick, 1931
- Haploscopa Meyrick, 1939
- Hednophora Meyrick, 1911
- Heliostibes Zeller, 1874
- Heloscopa Diakonoff, 1955
- Heringiana Hayward, 1967
- Homoplastis Meyrick, 1926
- Hyperskeles Butler, 1883
- Hypersymmoca Chrétien, 1917
- Irenia Clarke, 1978
- Isocrita Meyrick, 1909
- Lactistica Meyrick, 1907
- Langastis Meyrick, 1914
- Lasiochira Meyrick in Caradja & Meyrick, 1935
- Lasiomactra Meyrick, 1921
- Lelita Clarke, 1978
- Lepidechidna Meyrick, 1934
- Letogenes Meyrick, 1921
- Loxozyga Meyrick in Caradja & Meyrick, 1938
- Lygronoma Meyrick, 1913
- Macarocosma Meyrick, 1931
- Macrosaces Meyrick, 1905
- Melochrysis Meyrick, 1916
- Meloteles Meyrick, 1920
- Mesothyrsa Meyrick, 1910
- Mimopictes Turati, 1924
- Nagehana Özdikmen, 2009
- Nymphostola Meyrick, 1883
- Pseudoecophora Staudinger, 1899
- Promalactis Meyrick, 1908
- Ocyphron Meyrick, 1921
- Odonna Clarke, 1982
- Opsigenes Meyrick, 1918
- Orygocera Walsingham, 1897
- Oxycharis Meyrick, 1939
- Oxycrates Meyrick, 1930
- Oxyscopa Meyrick, 1926
- Pachyphoenix Butler, 1883
- Paradeuterogonia Saito, 1989
- Parapleuris Meyrick, 1937.
- Parodaea Meyrick, 1914
- Pedioxestis Meyrick, 1932
- Pelocharella T. B. Fletcher, 1940
- Perilachna Meyrick, 1914
- Phaulolechia Diakonoff, 1951
- Philametris Meyrick, 1924
- Philarga Meyrick, 1918
- Philomusaea Meyrick, 1931
- Phratriodes Meyrick, 1926
- Picrogenes Meyrick, 1917
- Picrotechna Meyrick, 1914
- Plasmatica Meyrick, 1914
- Platactis Meyrick, 1911
- Pleurotopsis Amsel, 1955
- Porthmologa Meyrick, 1914
- Proteodes Meyrick, 1883
- Protochanda Meyrick in Caradja & Meyrick, 1935
- Protonostoma Meyrick, 1910
- Psaltica Meyrick, 1905
- Pseudepiphractis Viette, 1956
- Pseudodoxia Durrant, 1895
- Pseudoprotasis Walsingham, 1897
- Pycnotarsa Meyrick, 1920
- Pyrophractis Meyrick, 1930
- Quelita Beéche, 2013
- Revonda Clarke, 1978
- Rhoecoptera Meyrick, 1909
- Secitis Meyrick, 1928
- Selidoris Meyrick, 1926
- Semnocosma Meyrick, 1924
- Sphenaspella T. B. Fletcher, 1940
- Stasixena Meyrick, 1930
- Stereodytis Meyrick, 1914
- Stereoptila Meyrick, 1917
- Struthoscelis Meyrick, 1913
- Tanyarches Meyrick, 1924
- Tanychastis Meyrick, 1910
- Taragmarcha Meyrick, 1910
- Taruda Walker, 1864
- Teratopsis Walsingham, 1881
- Teresita Clarke, 1978
- Terthrotica Meyrick, 1914
- Thamnocrana Meyrick, 1927
- Thaumatolita Walsingham, 1912
- Theatrocopia Walsingham, 1897
- Therapnis Meyrick, 1910
- Thyestarcha Meyrick, 1912
- Tinoecophora Amsel, 1968
- Trachypepla Meyrick, 1883
- Triptologa Meyrick, 1914
- Tyriograptis Meyrick, 1934
- Tyrolimnas Meyrick, 1934
- Tyromantis Meyrick, 1918
- Utilia Clarke, 1978
- Variacma Wang, 2006
- Xenomicta Meyrick, 1914
- Xenophanta Meyrick, 1914
- Xheroctys Viette, 1954
- Xylesthes Diakonoff, 1954
- Zulemita Urra, 2013
- Zygolopha Meyrick, 1914
- Zymrina Clarke, 1978
- Hierodoris group
- Athrotaxivora McQuillan, 1998
- Gymnobathra Meyrick, 1883
- Hierodoris Meyrick, 1912
- Izatha Walker, 1864
- Lathicrossa Meyrick, 1883
- Nemotyla Nielsen, McQuillan & Common, 1992
- Phaeosaces Meyrick, 1885
- Thamnosara Meyrick, 1883
- Tinearupa Salmon & Bradley, 1956
- Scieropepla Meyrick, 1886
- Wingia group
- Acanthodela Common, 1994
- Acorotricha Meyrick, 1913
- Ageletha Common, 1994
- Ancistromorpha Common, 1994
- Anthocoma Turner, 1946
- Antipterna Meyrick, 1916
- Arachnographa Meyrick, 1914
- Archaereta Meyrick, 1914
- Atelosticha Meyrick, 1883
- Baiocystis Common, 1994
- Basiplecta Common, 1994
- Bathrosterra Common, 1994
- Brachynemata Meyrick, 1883
- Callimima Turner, 1935
- Catacometes Common, 1994
- Chrysonoma Meyrick, 1914
- Coeranica Meyrick, 1883
- Compsotropha Meyrick, 1883
- Coryphoscola Common, 1994
- Cosmaresta Common, 1994
- Crepidosceles Meyrick, 1883
- Deigmoesta Common, 1994
- Diaphorodes Turner, 1946
- Echinobasis Common, 1994
- Elaphromorpha Turner, 1936
- Endeolena Common, 1994
- Enoplidia Common, 1994
- Eochrois Meyrick, 1886
- Epicurica Meyrick, 1914
- Eremnotypa Common, 1994
- Ericibdela Common, 1994
- Euchaetis Meyrick, 1883
- Euphiltra Meyrick, 1883
- Euthictis Meyrick, 1914
- Garrha Walker, 1866
- Habroscopa Meyrick, 1914
- Hadrocheta Common, 1994
- Hapaloteucha Meyrick, 1914
- Heliocausta Meyrick, 1883
- Hemibela Turner, 1894
- Heteroptolis Meyrick, 1914
- Heteroteucha Common, 1994
- Hoplomorpha Turner, 1916
- Hybocrossa Turner, 1917
- Idioxantha Common, 1994
- Idiozancla Turner, 1936
- Ironopolia Common, 1994
- Lamproxantha Common, 1994
- Lepidotarsa Meyrick, 1883
- Leucorhabda Common, 1994
- Limothnes Turner, 1935
- Linosticha Meyrick, 1883
- Liocnema Turner, 1941
- Lophopepla Turner, 1896
- Mionolena Common, 1994
- Myrascia Common, 1977
- Ocystola Meyrick, 1885
- Oligoloba Common, 1994
- Orthiastis Meyrick, 1914
- Paneutricha Common, 1994
- Parocystola Turner, 1896
- Phauloplana Common, 2000
- Phyllophanes Turner, 1896
- Phytotrypa Common, 1994
- Piloprepes Meyrick, 1883
- Placocosma Meyrick, 1883
- Platyphylla Turner, 1946
- Plectobela Common, 1994
- Plesiosticha Meyrick, 1921
- Poliorhabda Common, 1994
- Polyeucta Turner, 1917
- Prionocris Common, 1994
- Prodelaca Common, 1994
- Psaltriodes Meyrick, 1902
- Psaroxantha Common, 1994
- Ptyoptila Turner, 1946
- Pycnozancla Turner, 1917
- Rhadinoloba Common, 1994
- Saphezona Common, 1994
- Sclerocheta Common, 1994
- Scotodryas Turner, 1932
- Stereoloba Common, 1994
- Stictochila Common, 1994
- Syringoseca Common, 1994
- Tanyzancla Meyrick, 1918
- Thalerotricha Meyrick, 1883
- Tortricopsis Newman, 1856
- Trachyzancla Turner, 1917
- Wingia Walsingham in Walsingham & Durrant, 1900
- Zacorus Butler, 1882
- Zelotechna Meyrick, 1914
- Zonopetala Meyrick, 1883
- Chezala group
- Acantholena Common, 1997
- Acedesta Turner, 1940
- Aeolothapsa Common, 1997
- Allognoma Common, 1997
- Anomozancla Turner, 1936
- Artiastis Meyrick, 1889
- Ascetoloba Common, 1997
- Ataleida Common, 2000
- Atholosticta Common, 1997
- Boroscena Common, 1997
- Brachyzancla Turner, 1936
- Chezala Walker, 1864
- Cnecophora Common in Nielsen & Rangsi, 1996
- Coesyra Meyrick, 1883
- Conobrosis Common, 1997
- Cryptotypa Common, 1997
- Delexocha Common, 1997
- Diapatela Common, 1997
- Disselia Meyrick, 1883
- Dissoloba Common, 1997
- Drepanocera Common, 1997
- Enchronista Meyrick, 1914
- Epithymema Turner, 1914
- Ericrypsina Common, 1997
- Erythrisa Common, 1997
- Hadrognatha Common, 1997
- Hesperoptila Meyrick, 1902
- Heterozyga Meyrick, 1883
- Ioptera Meyrick, 1883
- Leistomorpha Meyrick, 1883
- Merocroca Common, 1997
- Nephogenes Meyrick, 1883
- Notodryas Meyrick, 1897
- Olbonoma Meyrick, 1914
- Olenacantha Common, 1997
- Oxythecta Meyrick, 1883
- Pantogymna Common, 1997
- Pararsia Turner, 1939
- Pelinoema Common, 1997
- Pellopsis Common, 1997
- Periorycta Meyrick, 1922
- Phauloglossa Common, 1997
- Phloeocetis Turner, 1936
- Phloeograptis Meyrick, 1904
- Phryganeutis Meyrick, 1884
- Platoloncha Common, 1997
- Prepalla Common, 1997
- Proteromicta Meyrick, 1889
- Pseudotheta Clarke, 1947
- Pycnocera Turner, 1896
- Satrapia Meyrick, 1883
- Scatochresis Common, 1997
- Stictopolia Common, 1997
- Tachystola Meyrick, 1914
- Tanycaula Common, 1997
- Telanepsia Turner, 1933
- Thema Walker, 1864
- Trichomoeris Meyrick, 1913
- Philobota group
- Diplogephyra Common, 1997
- Echinocosma Common, 1997
- Eusemocosma Common, 1997
- Gymnocoila Common, 1997
- Haplodyta Meyrick, 1883
- Isomoralla Common, 1997
- Microbela Meyrick, 1883
- Palimmeces Turner, 1916
- Parergophela Common, 1997
- Philobota Meyrick, Apr. 1883
- Prepocosma Common, 1997
- Stereocheta Common, 1997
- Telocharacta Common, 1997
- Eulechria group
- Acolasta Meyrick, 1902
- Aristeis Meyrick, 1884
- Atheropla Meyrick, 1883
- Diplogrypa Common, 1997
- Eulechria Meyrick, 1883
- Hoplostega Meyrick, 1914
- Pachybela Turner, 1917
- Petalanthes Meyrick, 1883
- Ptochosaris Meyrick, 1906
- Sclerocris Common, 1997
- Temnogyropa Common, 1997
- Barea group
- Airogephyra Common, 2000
- Analcodes Turner, 1947
- Ancharcha Meyrick, 1920
- Antiopala Meyrick, 1889
- Aspasiodes Turner, 1944
- Atalopsis Common, 2000
- Atomotricha Meyrick, 1883
- Baioglossa Common, 2000
- Barea Walker, 1864
- Casmara Walker, 1863
- Catadoceta Common, 2000
- Chersadaula Meyrick, 1923
- Cirrograpta Common, 2000
- Cirromitra Common, 2000
- Coelognatha Common, 2000
- Corocosma Meyrick, 1927
- Delophanes Turner, 1947
- Diaphanta Common, 1996
- Diocrogephyra Common, 2000
- Dolopsis Common, 2000
- Dysthreneta Turner, 1947
- Echinognatha Common, 2000
- Elaeonoma Meyrick, 1914
- Enlopholepis Common, 2000
- Ereiconastes Common, 2000
- Eremnozona Common, 2000
- Erythrobapta Common, 2000
- Euchersadaula Philpott, 1926
- Eucryphaea Turner, 1935
- Eulachna Meyrick, 1883
- Exarsia Meyrick, 1914
- Guestia Meyrick, 1889
- Habrochlanis Common, 2000
- Hesperenoeca Common, 2000
- Lasiocosma Common, 2000
- Laxonoma Meyrick, 1914
- Leimmatonca Common, 2000
- Leipochlida Common, 2000
- Leprocosma Common, 2000
- Leptocroca Meyrick, 1883
- Liozancla Turner, 1919
- Locheutis Meyrick, 1883
- Machaeritis Meyrick, 1883
- Machetis Meyrick, 1883
- Macronemata Meyrick, 1883
- Macrophara Turner, 1946
- Meioglossa Common, 2000
- Melanoima Common, 2000
- Mermeristis Meyrick, 1915
- Metaphrastis Meyrick, 1907
- Micramicta Common, 2000
- Micropeteina Common, 2000
- Mimobrachyoma Lower, 1902
- Neosigala Turner, 1917
- Ochropolia Common, 2000
- Ochyrolopha Common, 2000
- Oncolapara Common, 2000
- Oncomerista Common, 2000
- Opsitycha Meyrick, 1914
- Orescoa Turner, 1927
- Oresitropha Turner, 1927
- Ozotrypetes Common, 2000
- Pachyceraia Common, 2000
- Periallactis Meyrick, 1902
- Phloioletes Common, 2000
- Phriconyma Meyrick, 1883
- Protomacha Meyrick, 1883
- Psarophorca Common, 2000
- Pyrgoptila Meyrick, 1889
- Rhoecoceros Turner, 1940
- Saropla Meyrick, 1883
- Scalideutis Meyrick, 1906
- Scoliocheta Common, 2000
- Sphyrelata Meyrick, 1883
- Stenoptena Common, 2000
- Sympoecila Common, 2000
- Syncometes Common, 2000
- Syscalma Meyrick, 1920
- Thapsinotypa Common, 2000
- Trachyntis Meyrick, 1889
- Triacra Common, 2000
- Trinaconeura Turner, 1933
- Trisyntopa Lower, 1918
- Tisobarica group
- Aglaodes Turner, 1898
- Callithauma Turner, 1900
- Tisobarica Walker, 1864
- Unnamed group
- Aeolocosma Meyrick, 1880
- Ancistroneura Turner, 1947
- Chioneocephala Common, 2000
- Clonitica Meyrick, 1914
- Clymene Chambers, 1873
- Copidostola Lower, 1897
- Corethropalpa Turner, 1896
- Corynotricha Common, 2000
- Crossophora Meyrick, 1883
- Diasceta Common, 2000
- Eridolera Common, 2000
- Joonggoora Lucas, 1901
- Leptocopa Meyrick, 1918
- Leurophanes Turner, 1939
- Lonchoptena Common, 2000
- Microlocha Meyrick, 1914
- Nemepeira Common, 2000
- Ochlogenes Meyrick, 1883
- Oenochroa Meyrick, 1883
- Pauronota Lower, 1901
- Pholeutis Meyrick, 1906
- Teerahna Lucas, 1901
- Trachyxysta Meyrick, 1916
- Woorda Lucas, 1901
- Wullaburra Lucas, 1901
- Zatrichodes Meyrick, 1914
