= Guestia (disambiguation) =

Güestia are mythical beliefs in rural Galicia.

Guestia may also refer to:

- Guestia (fungus), a sac fungus genus in family Xylariaceae
- Guestia (moth), a concealer moth genus in subfamily Oecophorinae
