= Eclactistis =

Scientific classification
- Kingdom: Animalia
- Phylum: Arthropoda
- Class: Insecta
- Order: Lepidoptera
- Family: Oecophoridae
- Subfamily: Oecophorinae
- Genus: Eclactistis; Meyrick, 1913
- Species: E. byrseuta

Binomial name
- Eclactistis byrseuta Meyrick, 1913

Genus of moths

Eclactistis is a genus of moths of the family Oecophoridae.

There is only one species in this genus: Eclactistis byrseuta (Meyrick, 1913) that is found in New Guinea This species has a wingspan of 14-15mm.

An Australian species Eclactistis anisopasta Turner 1935 that was described in this genus was transferred to Baioglossa.
