= Utilia falcata =

Scientific classification
- Kingdom: Animalia
- Phylum: Arthropoda
- Class: Insecta
- Order: Lepidoptera
- Family: Oecophoridae
- Genus: Utilia
- Species: U. falcata

Binomial name
- Utilia falcata J. F. G. Clarke, 1978

Species of moth

Utilia falcata is a moth in the family Oecophoridae. It was described by John Frederick Gates Clarke in 1978. It is found in Chile.

The wingspan is about 24 mm. The forewings are pale ocheraceous buff. Well inside the termen there is a line of four tiny, ill-defined, single brownish scales and there is a single brownish scale at the basal two-fifths in the cell and on the fold a similar mark. The hindwings are ocherous white.
