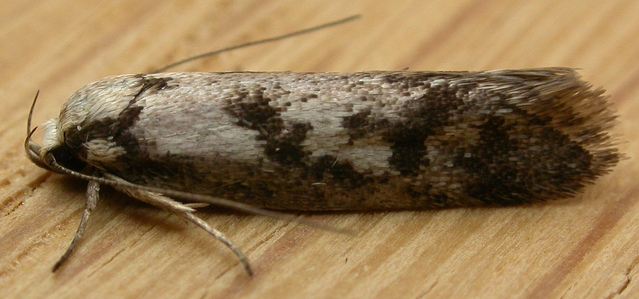

Scientific classification
- Kingdom: Animalia
- Phylum: Arthropoda
- Clade: Pancrustacea
- Class: Insecta
- Order: Lepidoptera
- Family: Oecophoridae
- Subfamily: Oecophorinae
- Genus: Eusemocosma; Common, 1997
- Species: E. pruinosa

Binomial name
- Eusemocosma pruinosa (Meyrick, 1884)

= Eusemocosma =

Genus of moths

Eusemocosma pruinosa is a moth of the family Oecophoridae. It is the only species in the genus Eusemocosma. It is found in Australia.
