= Alynda sarissa =

Scientific classification
- Kingdom: Animalia
- Phylum: Arthropoda
- Class: Insecta
- Order: Lepidoptera
- Family: Oecophoridae
- Genus: Alynda
- Species: A. sarissa

Binomial name
- Alynda sarissa J. F. G. Clarke, 1978

Species of moth

Alynda sarissa is a moth in the family Oecophoridae. It was described by John Frederick Gates Clarke in 1978. It is found in Chile.

The wingspan is about 20 mm. The forewings are light capucine orange with the basal fourth of the costa buckthorn brown and from the outer end of the dark costal shade a transverse, outwardly oblique fascia of the same color extends to the dorsum well before the tornus. Along termen is a narrow pinkish shade mixed with buckthorn brown. The hindwings are straw color, apically slightly darker.
