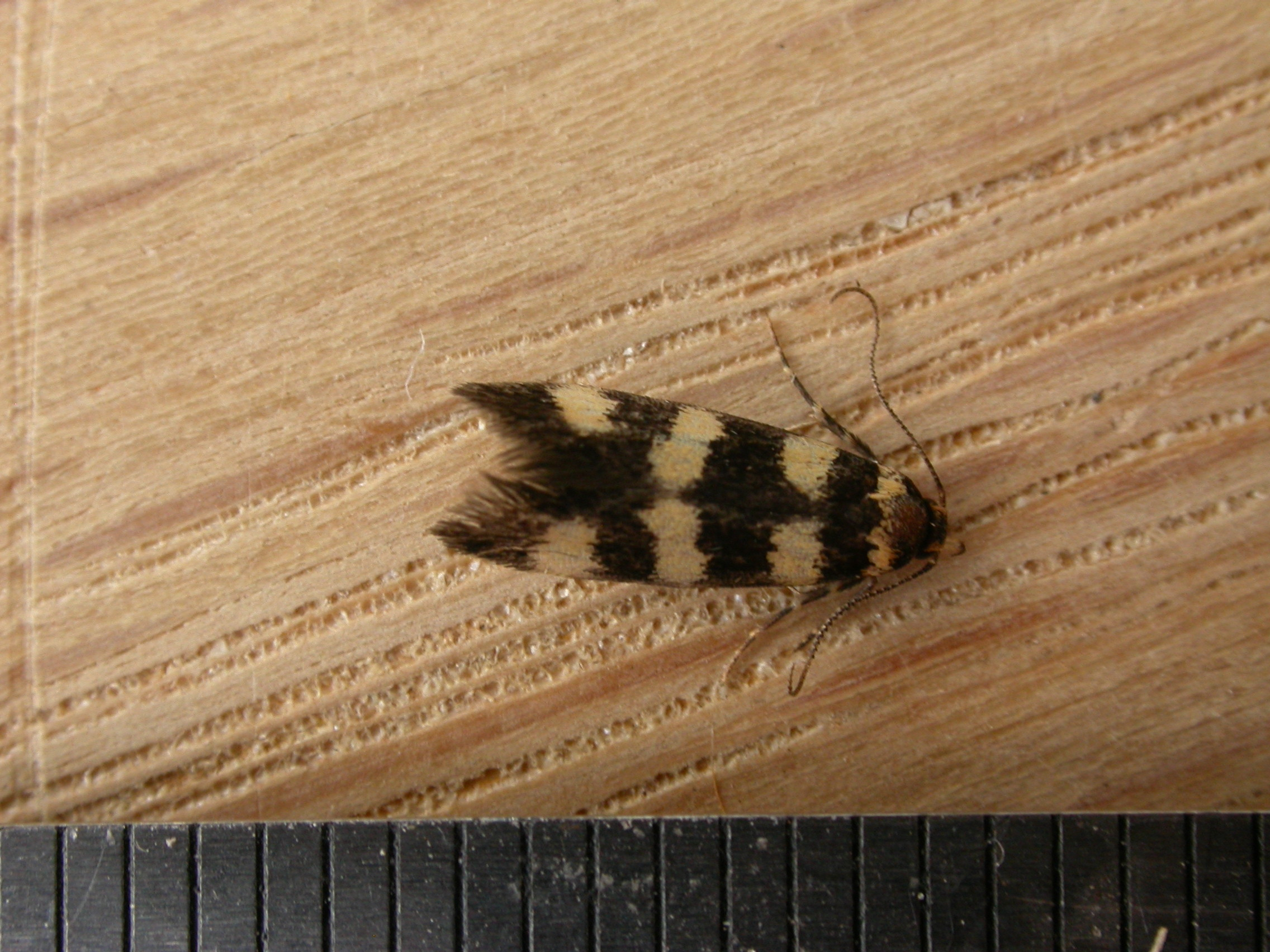

Scientific classification
- Kingdom: Animalia
- Phylum: Arthropoda
- Clade: Pancrustacea
- Class: Insecta
- Order: Lepidoptera
- Family: Oecophoridae
- Subfamily: Oecophorinae
- Genus: Cirromitra; Common, 2000
- Species: C. tetratherma

Binomial name
- Cirromitra tetratherma (Lower, 1896)

Synonyms
- Eulechria tetratherma Lower, 1896

= Cirromitra =

Species of moth

Cirromitra tetratherma is a moth of the family Oecophoridae. It is the only species in the genus Cirromitra.It is known from the Australian Capital Territory, New South Wales, Queensland and Victoria.
