= Macronemata =

Scientific classification
- Kingdom: Animalia
- Phylum: Arthropoda
- Clade: Pancrustacea
- Class: Insecta
- Order: Lepidoptera
- Family: Oecophoridae
- Subfamily: Oecophorinae
- Genus: Macronemata; Meyrick, 1883

Type species
- Macronemata elaphia Meyrick, 1883

Synonyms
- Eulechria elaphia; Eulechria exigua Turner, 1916; Macronemata omospila Turner, 1936; Macronemata pauxilla Turner, 1939; Machaeritis compsa Turner, 1939

Species of moth

Macronemata is a monotypic genus of moths of the family Oecophoridae. The only species is Macronemata elaphia. Both the genus and the sole species were described by Edward Meyrick in 1883.

Macronemata elaphia is endemic to Australia and is known from New South Wales and Tasmania.
