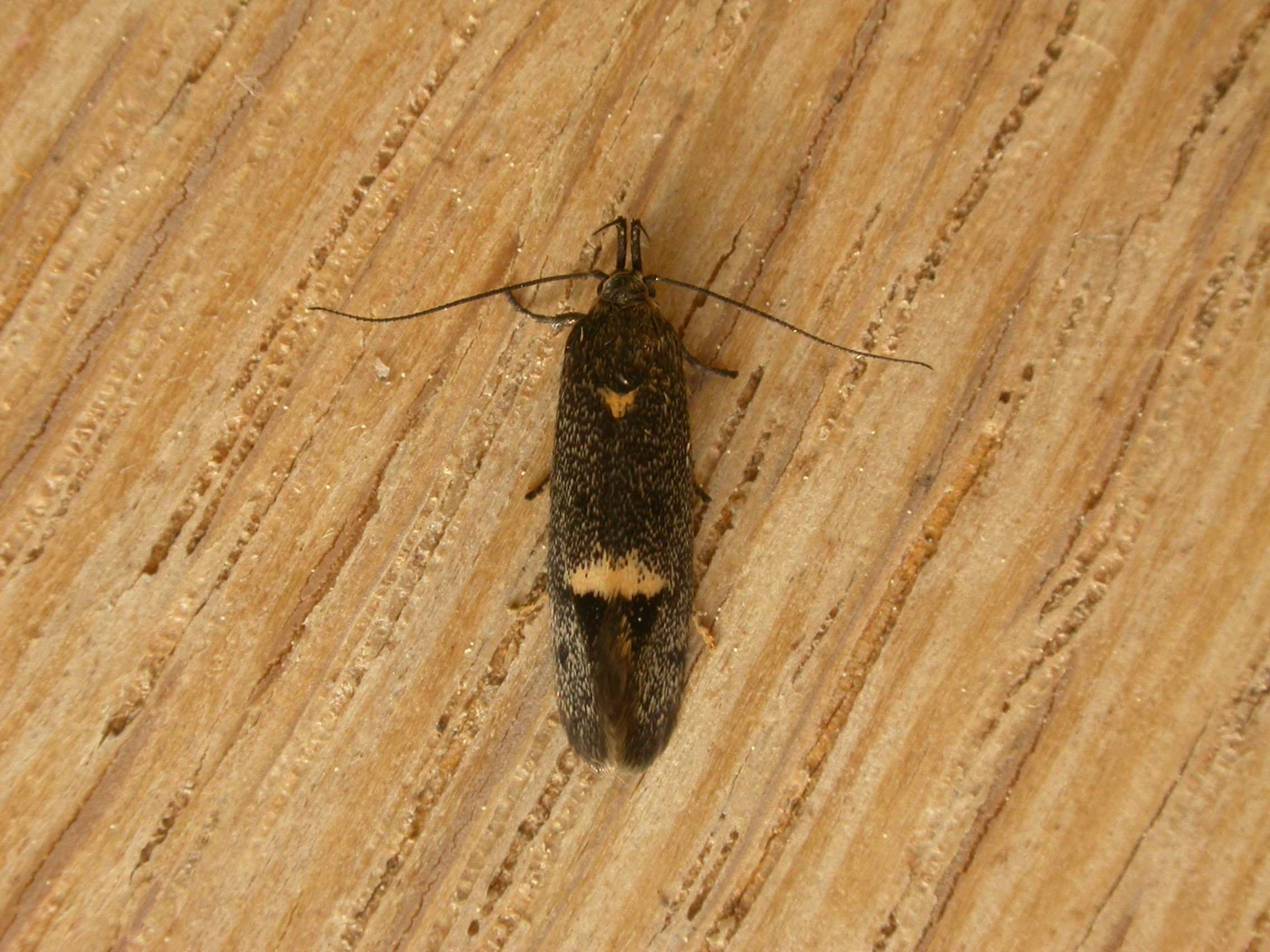

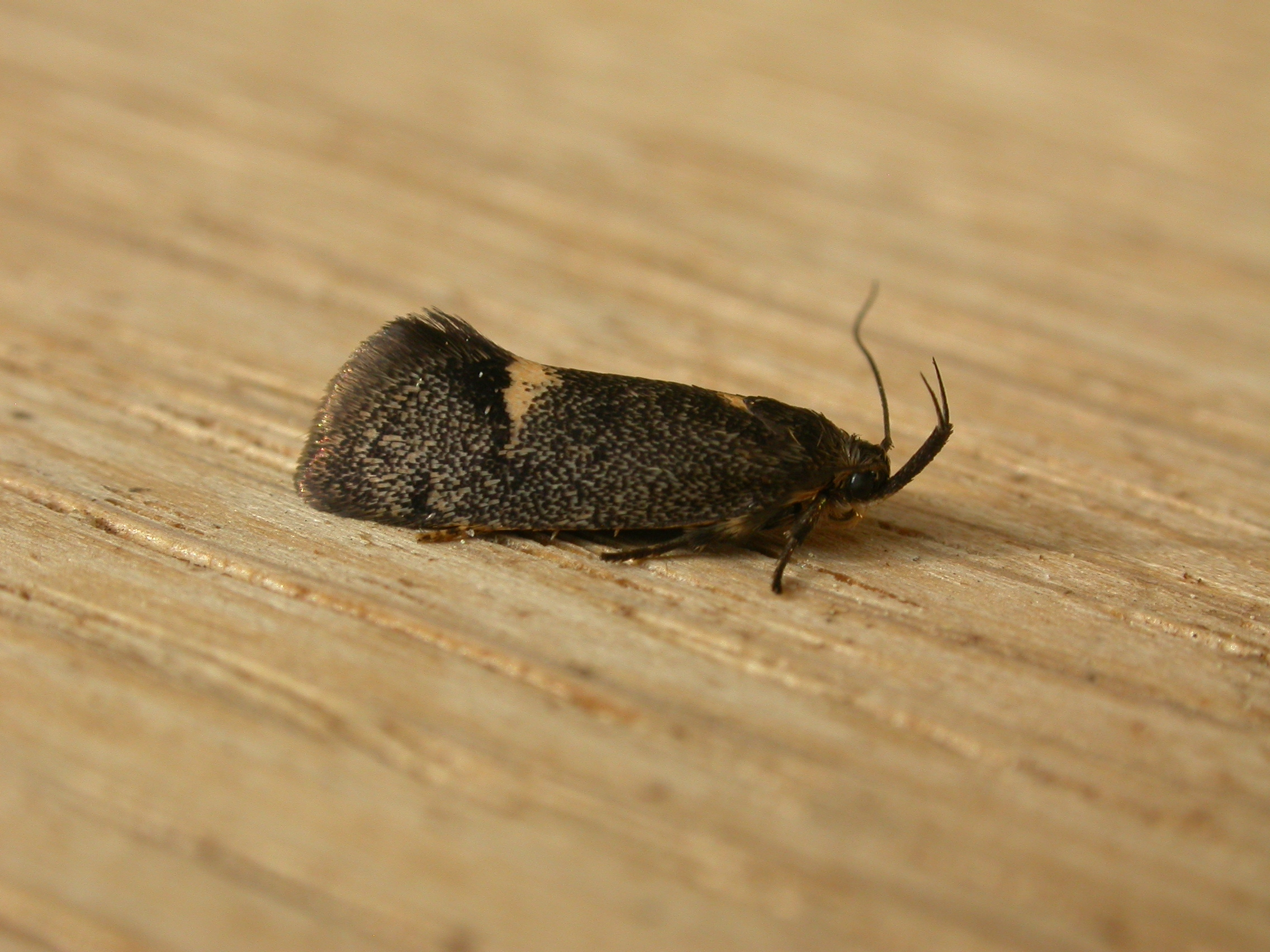

Scientific classification
- Kingdom: Animalia
- Phylum: Arthropoda
- Clade: Pancrustacea
- Class: Insecta
- Order: Lepidoptera
- Family: Oecophoridae
- Subfamily: Oecophorinae
- Genus: Leistomorpha; Meyrick, 1883
- Species: L. brontoscopa

Binomial name
- Leistomorpha brontoscopa Meyrick, 1884

Synonyms
- Leistomorpha macrozancla Turner, 1941; Leistomorpha metarrhaca Turner, 1944

= Leistomorpha =

Genus of moths

Leistomorpha brontoscopa is a moth of the family Oecophoridae. It is the only species in the genus Leistomorpha. It is known from the Australian Capital Territory, New South Wales, Tasmania and Victoria.

The larvae feed on the dead leaves of Eucalyptus species, including Eucalyptus bicostata and Eucalyptus bridgesiana. They can be found in dead leaf litter.
