= Oxycrates =

Scientific classification
- Kingdom: Animalia
- Phylum: Arthropoda
- Class: Insecta
- Order: Lepidoptera
- Family: Oecophoridae
- Subfamily: Oecophorinae
- Genus: Oxycrates; Meyrick, 1930

Genus of moths

Oxycrates is a genus of moths in the family Oecophoridae. The species of this genus are found on the Indian Ocean islands of the Seychelles, Mauritius and Réunion.

== Species ==
- Oxycrates fulvoradiella Legrand, 1966
- Oxycrates longodivisella Legrand, 1966
- Oxycrates reunionella Guillermet, 2011
- Oxycrates xanthopeda Meyrick, 1930
