= Peleopoda navigatrix =

Scientific classification
- Kingdom: Animalia
- Phylum: Arthropoda
- Class: Insecta
- Order: Lepidoptera
- Family: Depressariidae
- Genus: Peleopoda
- Species: P. navigatrix

Binomial name
- Peleopoda navigatrix (Meyrick, 1912)

Synonyms
- Xylorycta navigatrix Meyrick, 1912

Species of moth

Peleopoda navigatrix is a moth in the family Depressariidae. It was described by Edward Meyrick in 1912. It is found in Colombia.

The wingspan is about 25 mm. The forewings are shining white, with a faint ochreous tinge and an irregular blackish spot on the base of the costa. There is an irregular-edged triangular blackish patch occupying the median third of the costa and reaching half across the wing. An indistinct cloudy light grey curved shade is found from two-thirds of the costa to the dorsum before the tornus. There is some faint light grey suffusion towards the apex. The hindwings are ochreous whitish.
