= Nagehana rustica =

Scientific classification
- Kingdom: Animalia
- Phylum: Arthropoda
- Class: Insecta
- Order: Lepidoptera
- Family: Oecophoridae
- Genus: Nagehana
- Species: N. rustica

Binomial name
- Nagehana rustica (J. F. G. Clarke, 1978)

Synonyms
- Retha rustica J. F. G. Clarke, 1978

Species of moth

Nagehana rustica is a moth in the family Oecophoridae. It was described by John Frederick Gates Clarke in 1978. It is found in Chile.

The wingspan is 13–16 mm. The forewings are buff, streaked and spotted with fuscous and the base of the wing is blackish fuscous except for a streak of ground color inside the costa. There is a blackish-fuscous blotch in the middle of the cell and a similarly colored crescentic blotch at the end of the cell. A blackish-fuscous streak is found at two-thirds of the costa and from the costa, well before apex, an irregular, transverse fuscous line extends to the termen, then along the termen to the tornus. The hindwings are pale silvery gray.
