= Aniuta ochroleuca =

Scientific classification
- Kingdom: Animalia
- Phylum: Arthropoda
- Class: Insecta
- Order: Lepidoptera
- Family: Oecophoridae
- Genus: Aniuta
- Species: A. ochroleuca

Binomial name
- Aniuta ochroleuca J. F. G. Clarke, 1978

Species of moth

Aniuta ochroleuca is a moth in the family Oecophoridae. It was described by John Frederick Gates Clarke in 1978. It is found in Chile.

The wingspan is 12–13 mm. The forewings are ocherous white to white with the base of the costa fuscous. At the apical third of the costa is a fuscous spot and in the middle of the cell is an oblique fuscous dash and a spot of the same color at the end of the cell. At the middle, dorsally, is a fuscous suffusion and a shade of similar color around the termen. The hindwings are white, pale buff distally.
