= Utilia =

Scientific classification
- Kingdom: Animalia
- Phylum: Arthropoda
- Class: Insecta
- Order: Lepidoptera
- Family: Oecophoridae
- Subfamily: Oecophorinae
- Genus: Utilia; Clarke, 1978

Genus of moths

Utilia is a genus of moths in the family Oecophoridae.

== Species ==
- Utilia falcata Clarke, 1978
- Utilia florinda Clarke, 1978
- Utilia hualpensis Parra & Ramos-González, 2019
- Utilia luridella (Zeller, 1874)
- Utilia ochracea (Zeller, 1874)
