= Alynda cinnamomea =

Scientific classification
- Kingdom: Animalia
- Phylum: Arthropoda
- Class: Insecta
- Order: Lepidoptera
- Family: Oecophoridae
- Genus: Alynda
- Species: A. cinnamomea

Binomial name
- Alynda cinnamomea J. F. G. Clarke, 1978

Species of moth

Alynda cinnamomea is a moth in the family Oecophoridae. It was described by John Frederick Gates Clarke in 1978. It is found in Chile.

The wingspan is about 23 mm. The forewings are pale maize yellow with the basal half strongly overlaid with cinnamon. There is an obscure brownish spot in the middle of the cell and opposite it, on the fold, a similar dot. A brownish suffusion is found at the end of the cell, suggesting an ill-defined outer discal spot. The hindwings are pale maize yellow.
