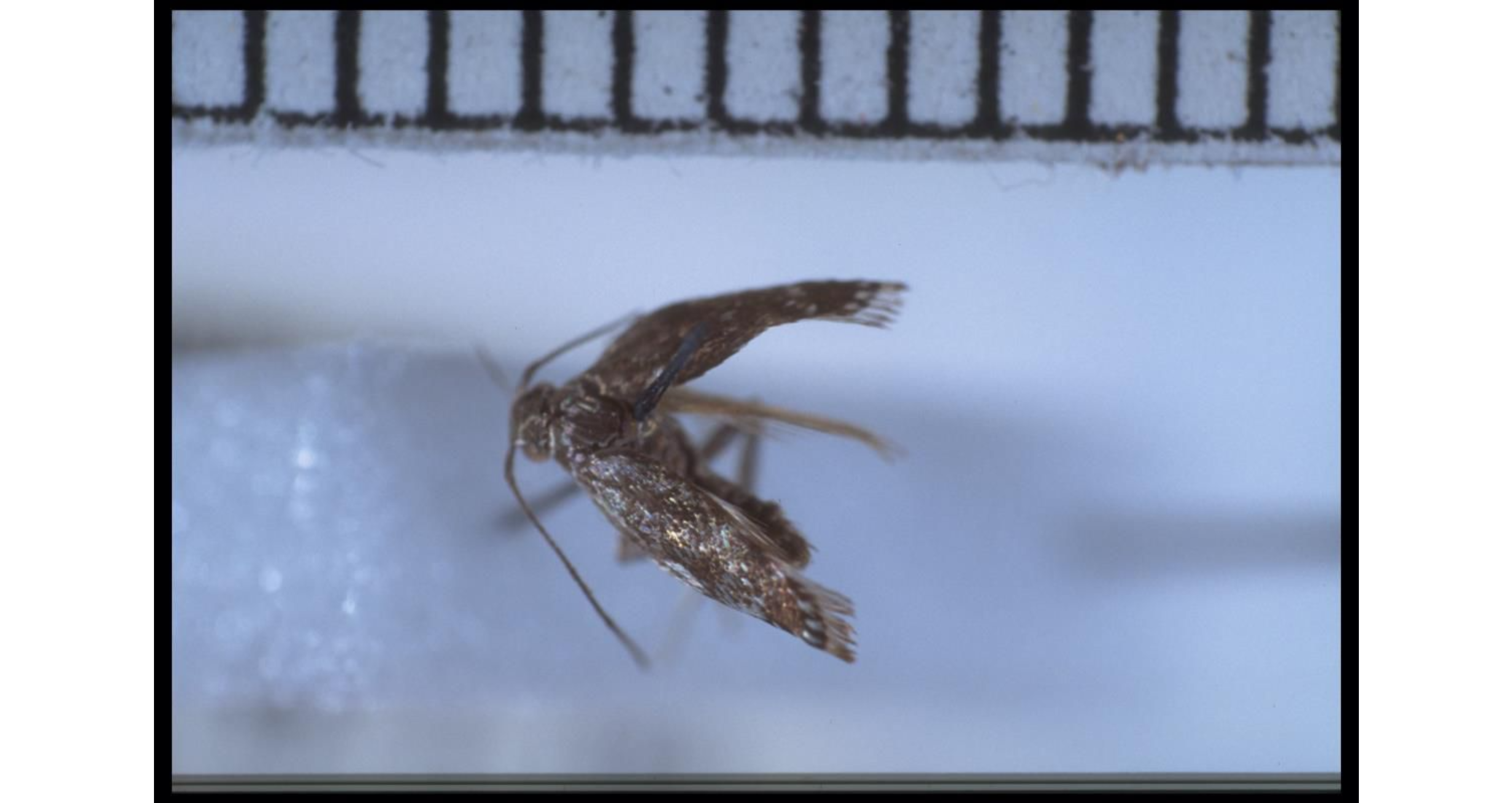
- Holotype of Tinearupa sorenseni aucklandica

Scientific classification
- Kingdom: Animalia
- Phylum: Arthropoda
- Clade: Pancrustacea
- Class: Insecta
- Order: Lepidoptera
- Family: Oecophoridae
- Subfamily: Oecophorinae
- Genus: Tinearupa; Salmon & Bradley, 1956
- Species: T. sorenseni

Binomial name
- Tinearupa sorenseni Salmon & Bradley, 1956

= Tinearupa =

Genus of moths

Tinearupa sorenseni is a moth of the family Oecophoridae first described by John Salmon and John David Bradley in 1956. It is the only species in the genus Tinearupa. It is endemic to New Zealand.

== Subspecies ==
This species contains the following two subspecies:

- Tinearupa sorenseni aucklandica Dugdale, 1971
- Tinearupa sorenseni sorenseni Salmon & Bradley, 1956
