= Irenia leucoxantha =

Scientific classification
- Kingdom: Animalia
- Phylum: Arthropoda
- Class: Insecta
- Order: Lepidoptera
- Family: Oecophoridae
- Genus: Irenia
- Species: I. leucoxantha

Binomial name
- Irenia leucoxantha J. F. G. Clarke, 1978

Species of moth

Irenia leucoxantha is a moth in the family Oecophoridae. It was described by John Frederick Gates Clarke in 1978. It is found in Chile.

The wingspan is 18–20 mm. The forewings are orange yellow with the extreme edge of the costa white. The surface of the wing with a few widely scattered black scales. The hindwings are pearl white.
