= Alynda striata =

Scientific classification
- Kingdom: Animalia
- Phylum: Arthropoda
- Class: Insecta
- Order: Lepidoptera
- Family: Oecophoridae
- Genus: Alynda
- Species: A. striata

Binomial name
- Alynda striata J. F. G. Clarke, 1978

Species of moth

Alynda striata is a moth in the family Oecophoridae. It was described by John Frederick Gates Clarke in 1978. It is found in Chile.

The wingspan is about 19 mm. The forewings are ochraceous buff with the extreme edge of the costa basally greyish fuscous. There is an irregular, outwardly oblique, cinnamon-brown fascia from the basal fourth of the costa extending to the dorsum well before the tornus. Between veins 8 to 11 cinnamon are brown streaks edged with pinkish scales and there is a cinnamon-brown blotch at the end of the cell, which narrows and extends to the apex. Along the termen is a cinnamon-brown line and there are pink scales scattered over the wing surface. The hindwings are grey with some fuscous scaling around the margins and apically.
