= Cenarchis =

Scientific classification
- Kingdom: Animalia
- Phylum: Arthropoda
- Clade: Pancrustacea
- Class: Insecta
- Order: Lepidoptera
- Family: Oecophoridae
- Subfamily: Oecophorinae
- Genus: Cenarchis; Meyrick, 1924

Genus of moths

Cenarchis is a genus of moths in the family Oecophoridae. All species were described by Edward Meyrick in 1924 and are found in Rodrigues.

== Species ==
- Cenarchis capitolina Meyrick, 1924
- Cenarchis celebrata Meyrick, 1924
- Cenarchis liopsamma Meyrick, 1924
- Cenarchis plectrophora Meyrick, 1924
- Cenarchis priscata Meyrick, 1924
- Cenarchis vesana Meyrick, 1924
- Cenarchis veterata Meyrick, 1924
