= Meioglossa =

Scientific classification
- Kingdom: Animalia
- Phylum: Arthropoda
- Clade: Pancrustacea
- Class: Insecta
- Order: Lepidoptera
- Family: Oecophoridae
- Subfamily: Oecophorinae
- Genus: Meioglossa; Common, 2000
- Species: M. pentochra

Binomial name
- Meioglossa pentochra (Lower, 1894)

Synonyms
- Oecophora pentochra Lower, 1894; Meleonoma basanista Meyrick, 1922

Genus of moths

Meioglossa pentochra is a moth in the family Oecophoridae. It is the only species in the genus Meioglossa. It is found in Australia, where it has been recorded from New South Wales, Queensland, South Australia, Victoria and Western Australia.
