= Alynda =

Scientific classification
- Kingdom: Animalia
- Phylum: Arthropoda
- Class: Insecta
- Order: Lepidoptera
- Family: Oecophoridae
- Subfamily: Oecophorinae
- Genus: Alynda; Clarke, 1978

Genus of moths

Alynda is a genus of moths in the family Oecophoridae.

== Species ==
- Alynda cinnamomea Clarke, 1978
- Alynda sarissa Clarke, 1978
- Alynda striata Clarke, 1978
