= Teresita isaura =

Scientific classification
- Kingdom: Animalia
- Phylum: Arthropoda
- Class: Insecta
- Order: Lepidoptera
- Family: Oecophoridae
- Genus: Teresita
- Species: T. isaura

Binomial name
- Teresita isaura J. F. G. Clarke, 1978

Species of moth

Teresita isaura is a moth in the family Oecophoridae. It was described by John Frederick Gates Clarke in 1978. It is found in Chile.

The wingspan is about 25 mm. The forewings are light ochraceous buff and the extreme base of the costa is cinnamon buff. There is an ill-defined cinnamon buff fascia from near the end of the cell to the tornus. The hindwings are ocherous white, darker toward the margins.
