= Despina rhodosema =

Scientific classification
- Kingdom: Animalia
- Phylum: Arthropoda
- Clade: Pancrustacea
- Class: Insecta
- Order: Lepidoptera
- Family: Oecophoridae
- Subfamily: Oecophorinae
- Genus: Despina; Clarke, 1978
- Species: D. rhodosema

Binomial name
- Despina rhodosema (Meyrick, 1931)

Synonyms
- Borkhausenia rhodosema Meyrick, 1931

Species of moth

Despina rhodosema is a moth in the family Oecophoridae first described by Edward Meyrick in 1931. It is the only species in the monotypic genus Despina erected by John Frederick Gates Clarke in 1978. It is found in Chile.
