= Teresita (moth) =

Scientific classification
- Kingdom: Animalia
- Phylum: Arthropoda
- Class: Insecta
- Order: Lepidoptera
- Family: Oecophoridae
- Subfamily: Oecophorinae
- Genus: Teresita; Clarke, 1978

Genus of moths

Teresita is a genus of moths in the family Oecophoridae described by John Frederick Gates Clarke in 1978.

== Species ==
- Teresita diffinis (Felder & Rogenhofer, 1875)
- Teresita isaura Clarke, 1978
