= Tanychastis =

Scientific classification
- Kingdom: Animalia
- Phylum: Arthropoda
- Class: Insecta
- Order: Lepidoptera
- Family: Oecophoridae
- Subfamily: Oecophorinae
- Genus: Tanychastis; Meyrick, 1910

Genus of moths

Tanychastis is a genus of moths of the family Oecophoridae.

== Species ==
- Tanychastis lysigama Meyrick, 1910
- Tanychastis moreauella Guillermet, 2011
