= Peleopoda spudasma =

Scientific classification
- Kingdom: Animalia
- Phylum: Arthropoda
- Class: Insecta
- Order: Lepidoptera
- Family: Depressariidae
- Genus: Peleopoda
- Species: P. spudasma

Binomial name
- Peleopoda spudasma (Walsingham, 1912)

Synonyms
- Theatria spudasma Walsingham, 1912

Species of moth

Peleopoda spudasma is a moth in the family Depressariidae. It was described by Lord Walsingham in 1912. It is found in Panama and Venezuela.

The wingspan is about 17 mm. The forewings are very pale whitish ochreous, much shaded throughout with fawn grey, with the exception of a pale patch from the end of the cell to the outer end of the fold. A fuscous discal spot at one-third, followed by another at the end of the cell, with a plical spot below them nearer to the latter than to the former. A fuscous marginal shade extends along the termen and is broken into spots around the apex and at the base of the costal cilia. The hindwings are whitish.
