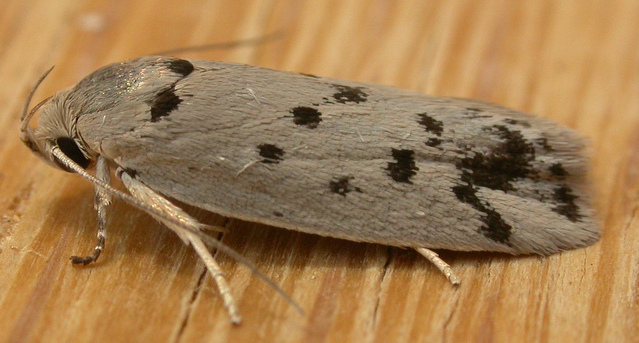

Scientific classification
- Kingdom: Animalia
- Phylum: Arthropoda
- Clade: Pancrustacea
- Class: Insecta
- Order: Lepidoptera
- Family: Oecophoridae
- Subfamily: Oecophorinae
- Genus: Ericibdela; Common, 1994
- Species: E. delotis

Binomial name
- Ericibdela delotis Meyrick, 1888

= Ericibdela =

Genus of moths

Ericibdela delotis is a moth of the family Oecophoridae. It is found in Australia. It is the type species and only species of the genus Ericibdela.
