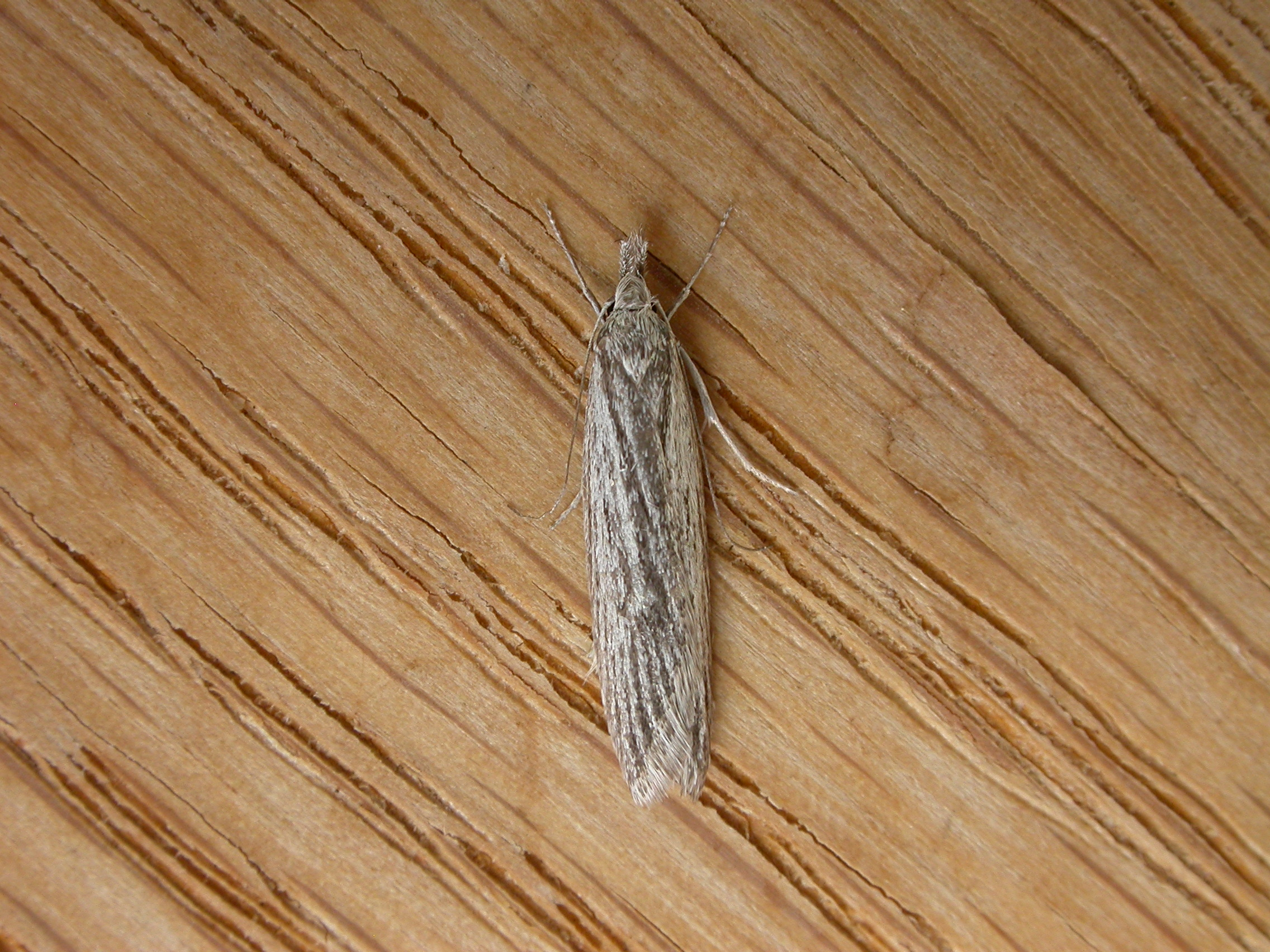

Scientific classification
- Kingdom: Animalia
- Phylum: Arthropoda
- Clade: Pancrustacea
- Class: Insecta
- Order: Lepidoptera
- Family: Oecophoridae
- Subfamily: Oecophorinae
- Genus: Phryganeutis; Meyrick, 1884
- Species: P. cinerea

Binomial name
- Phryganeutis cinerea Meyrick, 1884

Synonyms
- Pleurota leuconeura Turner, 1917

= Phryganeutis =

Genus of moths

Phryganeutis cinerea is a moth of the family Oecophoridae. It is the only species in the genus Phryganeutis. It is found in Western Australia, New South Wales, Queensland, South Australia, Tasmania and Victoria.
