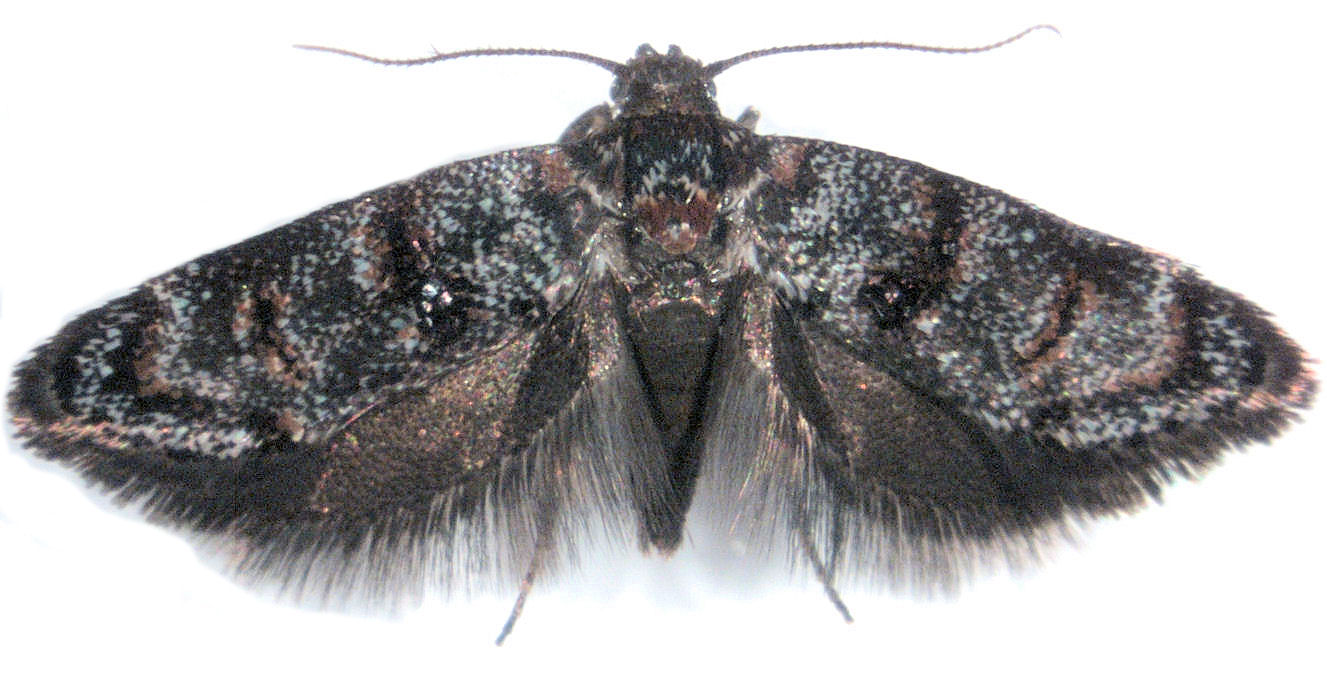

Scientific classification
- Kingdom: Animalia
- Phylum: Arthropoda
- Clade: Pancrustacea
- Class: Insecta
- Order: Lepidoptera
- Family: Oecophoridae
- Subfamily: Oecophorinae
- Genus: Corocosma; Meyrick, 1927
- Species: C. memorabilis

Binomial name
- Corocosma memorabilis Meyrick, 1927

= Corocosma =

Species of moth

Corocosma memorabilis is a species of moth in the family Oecophoridae. It is the only species in the genus Corocosma.It is endemic to New Zealand.

== Original description ==
♀ 8 mm. Head whitish, crown sprinkled grey. Palpi whitish. Thorax brownish sprinkled dark grey. Forewings suboblong, apex obtuse, termen slightly rounded, oblique; brown; a transverse streak of blackish irroration near base, beyond this a fascia of dark grey and whitish irroration, including two successive white spots in disc; plical and first discal stigmata represented by two spots transversely placed of raised blackish scales suffused coppery and tipped prismatic-metallic, above these a blackish spot on costa followed by slight whitish irroration; irregular narrow angulated fasciae of dark grey and whitish irroration crossing wing beyond middle and at 4/5, connected on costa, between these a curved transverse streak of raised blackish scales in disc, immediately beyond second a white spot on costa; a marginal streak of dark grey and whitish irroration round posterior part of costa and termen, preceded by an irregular blackish streak; cilia fuscous with strong, coppery-metallic reflections, a blackish subbasal line. Hindwings dark grey; cilia grey, a dark fuscous subbasal line.

Shedwood Forest, Tapawera, January (Miss Stella Hudson); one specimen. This seemingly obscure but really beautiful little insect (the smallest of the 154 New Zealand Oecophoridae) is probably adapted by its complex marking and rough scaling for concealment on tree-trunks, and by its bright metallic and coppery ornamentation for flying in sunshine, both these habits being characteristic of the species of Petalanthes also.
