= Peleopoda semocrossa =

Scientific classification
- Kingdom: Animalia
- Phylum: Arthropoda
- Class: Insecta
- Order: Lepidoptera
- Family: Depressariidae
- Genus: Peleopoda
- Species: P. semocrossa

Binomial name
- Peleopoda semocrossa Meyrick, 1930

Species of moth

Peleopoda semocrossa is a moth in the family Depressariidae. It was described by Edward Meyrick in 1930. It is found in Bolivia.

The wingspan is about 19 mm. The forewings are white, with a very faint yellowish tinge. There is a light greyish-ochreous transverse streak on the end of the cell. The hindwings are white.
