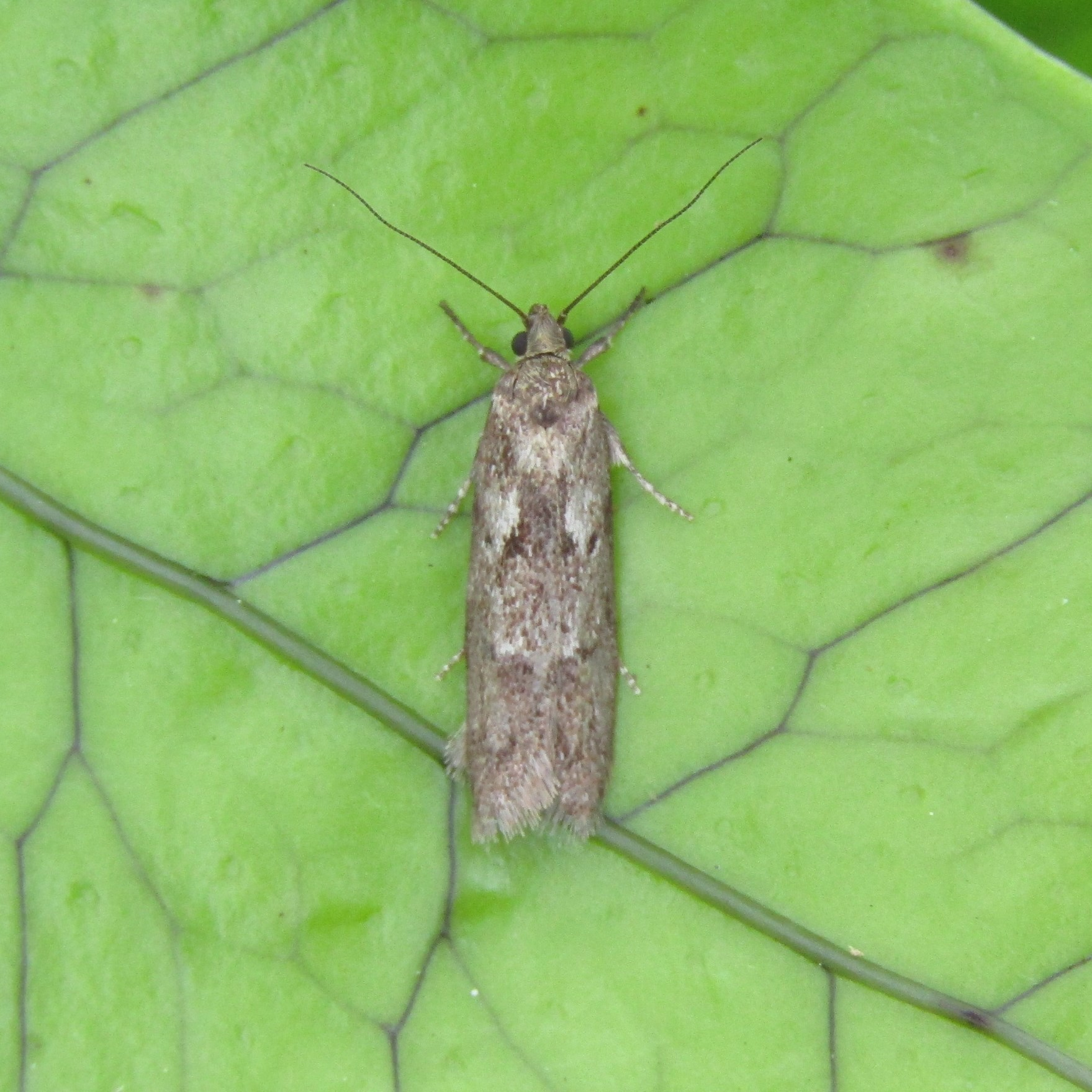

Conservation status
- Data Deficit (NZ TCS)

Scientific classification
- Kingdom: Animalia
- Phylum: Arthropoda
- Clade: Pancrustacea
- Class: Insecta
- Order: Lepidoptera
- Family: Oecophoridae
- Subfamily: Oecophorinae
- Genus: Chersadaula; Meyrick, 1923
- Species: C. ochrogastra

Binomial name
- Chersadaula ochrogastra Meyrick, 1923

Synonyms
- Chersadaula ochrogaster

= Chersadaula =

Species of moth endemic to New Zealand

Chersadaula ochrogastra is a species of moth in the family Oecophoridae. It is the only species in the genus Chersadaula. This species is endemic to New Zealand. It is classified as "Data Deficient" by the Department of Conservation.

== Taxonomy ==
This species was described by Edward Meyrick in 1923 from specimens obtained by George Hudson at Breaker Bay in Wellington. Hudson found larvae of the species in September and raised them to adulthood in November. Hudson discussed and illustrated this species in his 1928 publication The Moths and Butterflies of New Zealand. The lectotype is held at the Natural History Museum, London.

There is one undescribed species in the same genus, but otherwise the genus is monotypic.

== Description ==
The eggs of this species are white and approximately 3mm in length, and cylindrical in shape although slightly broader at one end.

The larvae, when fully grown, are approximately 2 cm long and are cylinder shaped with a tapered end. The head is bright yellowish-brown, the first part of the larva is yellowish-white, then tinged with black, then whitish with irregular tinges of chocolate brown.

Meyrick described the adult moths of the species as follows:

♂ 17 mm. Head ochreous-whitish, hairs greyish towards base. Palpi ochreous-whitish mixed with grey. Antennal ciliations ♂ 1 1/2. Thorax ochreous-whitish slightly tinged with rosy, and suffusedly mixed with grey. Abdomen light yellow-ochreous. Forewings elongate, costa slightly arched, apex obtuse, termen very obliquely rounded; light-brownish irregularly tinged with rosy-pink, and sprinkled with grey-whitish and dark fuscous; a dark-fuscous dot on base of costa; a spot of dark-fuscous irroration in disc towards base; stigmata roundish, dark fuscous, plical beneath first discal, opposite spots of dark-fuscous suffusion on costa and dorsum before these two and suffusedly connected with them, plical preceded by some white suffusion, a roundish blotch of dark-fuscous irroration between second discal and tornus, preceded by narrow whitish suffusion; an irregular illdefined and incomplete angulated subterminal line of dark-fuscous irroration, indented above angle: cilia pale ochreous tinged with rosy, base sprinkled with dark fuscous. Hindwings dark grey, lighter towards base; cilia grey. ♀ 16 mm. Abdomen yellow-ochreous, grey on sides and praeanal segment, anal segment whitish. Forewings broad-lanceolate, apex strongly and narrowly produced, pointed; colour and markings nearly as in ♂, but basal third more whitish, angularly prominent in disc, a stronger blackish mark between second discal and tornus. Hindwings rather broad-lanceolate, less than half length of forewings and about half as broad: cilia grey-whitish.

== Distribution ==
It is endemic to New Zealand. It has been found in the North Island. However this species has not been collected since 1923.

== Biology and behaviour ==
Larvae have been found under stones. Adults emerge in early November. The adult female of this species has noticeable wing reduction and is incapable of flight.

== Host species and habitat ==
The female adult moths place their eggs indiscriminately and they are not attached to anything. The larvae of this moth live in silken cocoons in the earth and feed on grass roots. The preferred habitat of the larvae of this species is along the sea-coast, about three metres above the high tide mark.

== Conservation status ==
This species has been classified as having the "Data Deficient" conservation status under the New Zealand Threat Classification System.
