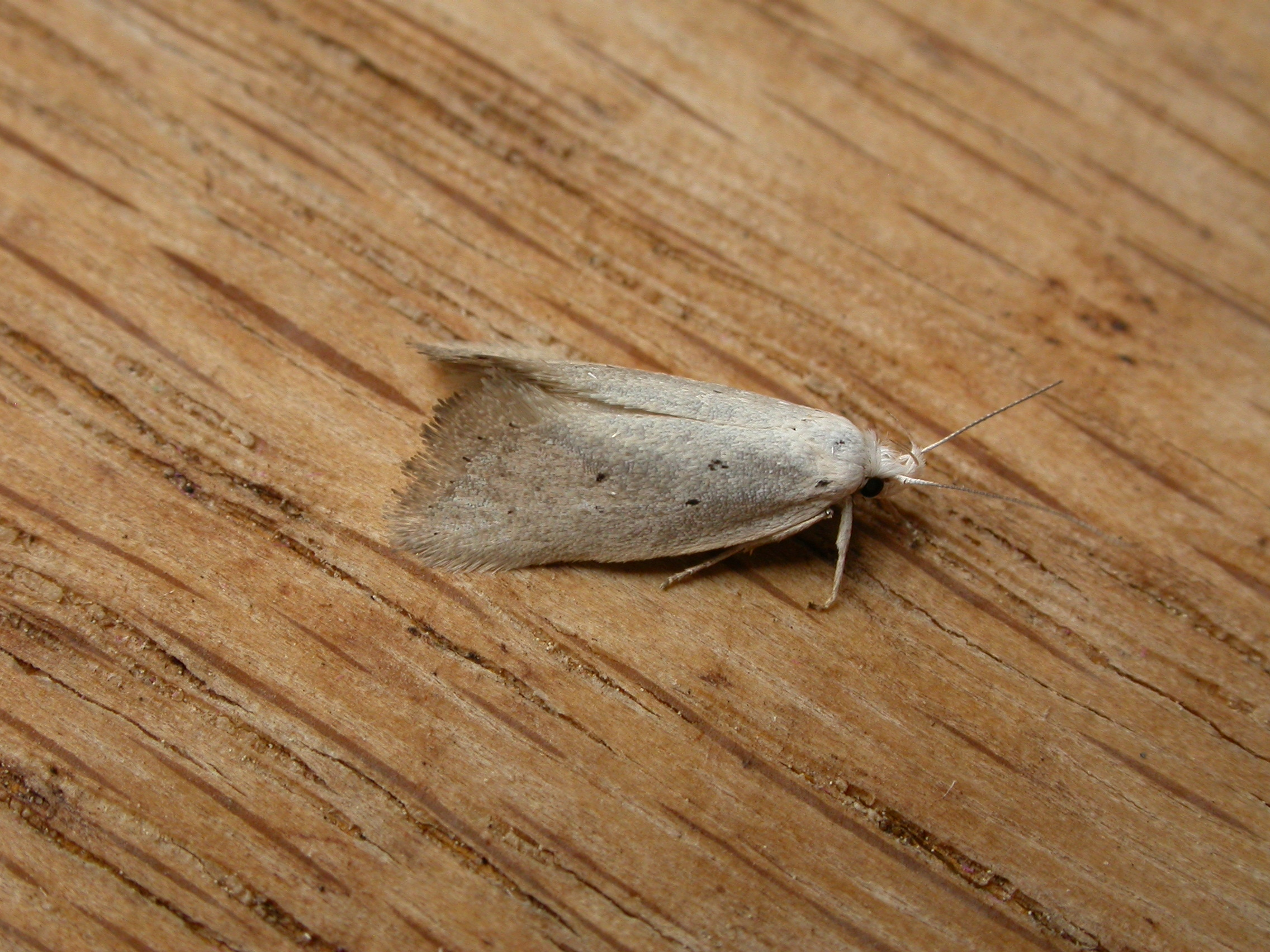

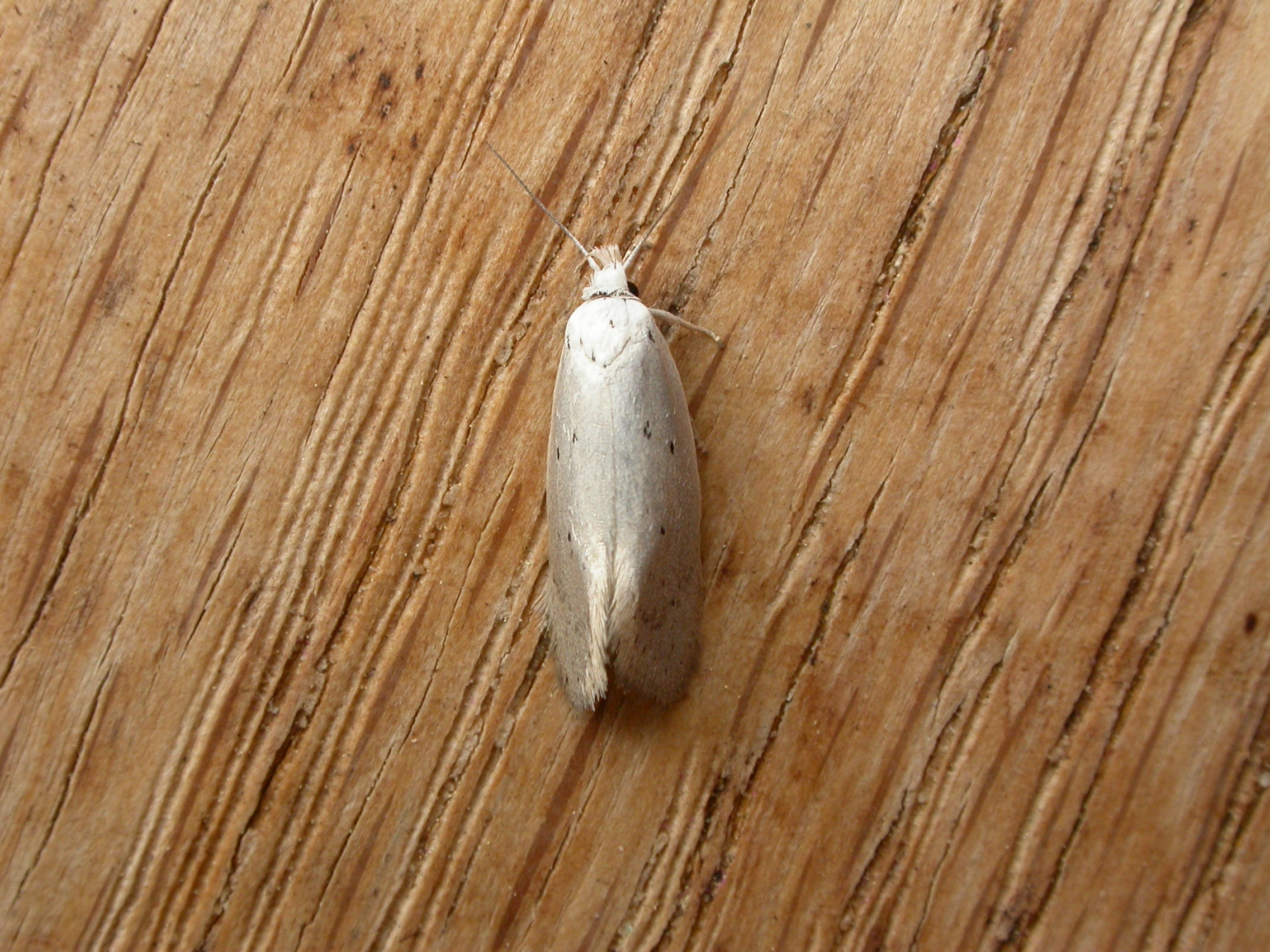

Scientific classification
- Kingdom: Animalia
- Phylum: Arthropoda
- Clade: Pancrustacea
- Class: Insecta
- Order: Lepidoptera
- Family: Oecophoridae
- Subfamily: Oecophorinae
- Genus: Thalerotricha; Meyrick, 1883
- Species: T. mylicella

Binomial name
- Thalerotricha mylicella Meyrick, 1884

= Thalerotricha =

Genus of moths

Thalerotricha mylicella is a moth of the family Oecophoridae. It is the only species in the genus Thalerotricha. It is known from the Australian Capital Territory, New South Wales, Queensland, Tasmania and Victoria.
