= Peleopoda convoluta =

Scientific classification
- Kingdom: Animalia
- Phylum: Arthropoda
- Class: Insecta
- Order: Lepidoptera
- Family: Depressariidae
- Genus: Peleopoda
- Species: P. convoluta

Binomial name
- Peleopoda convoluta Duckworth, 1970

Species of moth

Peleopoda convoluta is a moth in the family Depressariidae. First described by W. Donald Duckworth in 1970, it is found in Venezuela.
