= Aniuta =

Scientific classification
- Kingdom: Animalia
- Phylum: Arthropoda
- Class: Insecta
- Order: Lepidoptera
- Family: Oecophoridae
- Subfamily: Oecophorinae
- Genus: Aniuta; Clarke, 1978

Genus of moths

Aniuta is a genus of moths in the family Oecophoridae.

== Species ==
- Aniuta melanoma Clarke, 1978
- Aniuta ochroleuca Clarke, 1978
