= Diplogrypa =

Scientific classification
- Kingdom: Animalia
- Phylum: Arthropoda
- Class: Insecta
- Order: Lepidoptera
- Family: Oecophoridae
- Subfamily: Oecophorinae
- Genus: Diplogrypa; Common, 1997
- Species: D. microptera

Binomial name
- Diplogrypa microptera (Turner, 1916)

Synonyms
- Machimia microptera Turner, 1916

Genus of moths

Diplogrypa is a genus of moths of the family Oecophoridae erected by Ian Francis Bell Common in 1997. It contains only one species, Diplogrypa microptera which was first described by Alfred Jefferis Turner in 1916 and is found Australia, where it has been recorded from Queensland.

The wingspan is 12–14 mm. The forewings are pale fuscous, sparsely sprinkled with fuscous and with a discal dot at two-fifths, a second beneath it on the fold and a third at three-fifths. The hindwings are ochreous whitish, at the apex tinged with fuscous.
