= Heloscopa =

Scientific classification
- Kingdom: Animalia
- Phylum: Arthropoda
- Clade: Pancrustacea
- Class: Insecta
- Order: Lepidoptera
- Family: Oecophoridae
- Genus: Heloscopa; Diakonoff, 1955
- Species: H. petricola

Binomial name
- Heloscopa petricola Diakonoff, 1955

Genus of moths

Heloscopa is a moth genus. It was placed initially in the family Tineidae of superfamily Tineoidea, but it appears to belong to the related Gelechoidea, and therein to subfamily Oecophorinae of the family Oecophoridae.

The genus is treated as monotypic, with the single species Heloscopa petricola placed here. The species is found in New Guinea.
