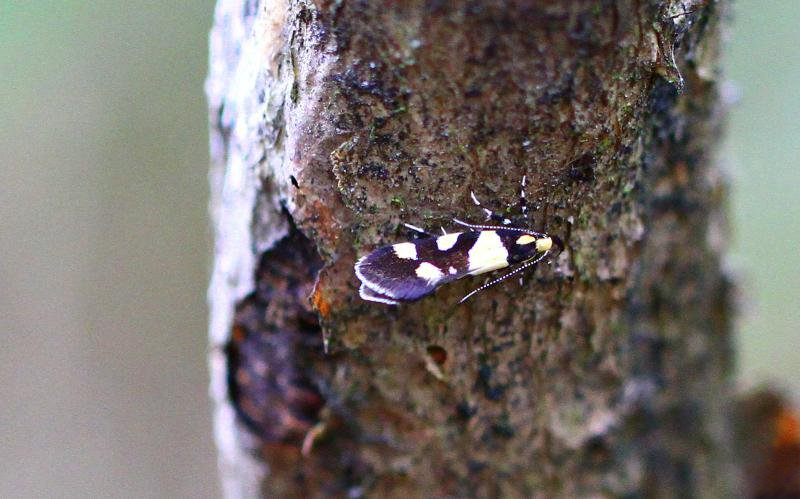

Scientific classification
- Kingdom: Animalia
- Phylum: Arthropoda
- Class: Insecta
- Order: Lepidoptera
- Family: Oecophoridae
- Subfamily: Oecophorinae
- Genus: Eratophyes; Diakonoff, 1975
- Species: E. amasiella

Binomial name
- Eratophyes amasiella (Herrich-Schäffer, 1854)

Synonyms
- Lampros amasiella Herrich-Schäffer, 1854; Borkhausenia amasiella; Oecophora amasiella; Schiffermuelleria amasiella; Eratophyes aleatrix Diakonoff, 1975

= Eratophyes =

Genus of moths

Eratophyes is a genus of moths in the family Oecophoridae. It contains only one species, Eratophyes amasiella, which is found in Asia Minor, the Netherlands, Germany, Denmark and Sweden. It was first recorded in Belgium in 2004. The species was probably accidentally introduced in western Europe, most likely as a caterpillar or pupa, with logs.

The wingspan is 12.5–16 mm. Adults are on wing from late April to June.

The larvae feed on decaying birch logs.
