= Crossophora =

Scientific classification
- Kingdom: Animalia
- Phylum: Arthropoda
- Clade: Pancrustacea
- Class: Insecta
- Order: Lepidoptera
- Family: Oecophoridae
- Subfamily: Oecophorinae
- Genus: Crossophora; Meyrick, 1883

Genus of moths

Crossophora is a genus of gelechioid moths from eastern Australia. It belongs to the family Oecophoridae, and therein to subfamily Oecophorinae. The genus was described by Edward Meyrick in 1883. As regards described species, it is monotypic. But at least one undescribed species is known to exist:

- Crossophora semiota Meyrick, 1886
- Crossophora sp. 'Queensland-Victoria'

Several related species were placed here too; indeed, the type species was only described after the genus had been established. All other supposed Crossophora were subsequently moved to other genera, but C. semiota was considered to be too distinct to be incorporated elsewhere. The genus name is valid because it was published as part of a single-access key, and because the description of C. semiota was accompanied by a full description of the genus.

The caterpillars of these moths feed on dead leaves of Eucalyptus, which they spin together with silk.
