= Eraina thamnocephala =

Scientific classification
- Kingdom: Animalia
- Phylum: Arthropoda
- Class: Insecta
- Order: Lepidoptera
- Family: Oecophoridae
- Genus: Eraina
- Species: E. thamnocephala

Binomial name
- Eraina thamnocephala J. F. G. Clarke, 1978

Species of moth

Eraina thamnocephala is a species of moth in the family Oecophoridae erected by John Frederick Gates Clarke in 1978. It is found in Chile.

The wingspan is 17–21 mm. The forewings are pale cream, with the extreme edge of the basal fifth of the costa fuscous and fuscous discal spots as follows: one in the cell at the basal third, one slightly beyond in the fold, and a transverse pair at the end of the cell. The surface with or without ill-defined clay color patches and sparse fuscous irrorations (sprinkles). Around the termen, a series of 4 or 5 fuscous spots is found, which are sometimes confluent. The hindwings are ocherous white with the surface, especially toward the margins sprinkled with grayish-fuscous scales and the outer edge narrow grayish fuscous.
