= Irenia =

Scientific classification
- Kingdom: Animalia
- Phylum: Arthropoda
- Class: Insecta
- Order: Lepidoptera
- Family: Oecophoridae
- Subfamily: Oecophorinae
- Genus: Irenia; Clarke, 1978

Genus of moths

Irenia is a genus of moths in the family Oecophoridae.

== Species ==
- Irenia curvula Clarke, 1978
- Irenia leucoxantha Clarke, 1978
