= Corita (moth) =

Scientific classification
- Kingdom: Animalia
- Phylum: Arthropoda
- Class: Insecta
- Order: Lepidoptera
- Family: Oecophoridae
- Subfamily: Oecophorinae
- Genus: Corita; J. F. G. Clarke, 1978
- Species: C. amphichroma

Binomial name
- Corita amphichroma J. F. G. Clarke, 1978

Species of moth

Corita amphichroma is a moth in the family Oecophoridae and the only species in the genus Corita. Both the genus and species were described by John Frederick Gates Clarke in 1978. It is found in Chile.

The wingspan is 16–19 mm. The forewings are clay colored with three black discal spots, one on the fold, one in the cell at two-fifths and one at the end of the cell. The costa has two buff spots, one, the smaller of the two slightly before the middle, the larger one slightly beyond the middle, the latter followed by an ill-defined fuscous blotch. From the outer angle of this blotch an outwardly curved row of small fuscous spots ends at the tornus. The hindwings are ocherous white with the veins and outer margin infuscated.
