= Aniuta melanoma =

Scientific classification
- Kingdom: Animalia
- Phylum: Arthropoda
- Class: Insecta
- Order: Lepidoptera
- Family: Oecophoridae
- Genus: Aniuta
- Species: A. melanoma

Binomial name
- Aniuta melanoma J. F. G. Clarke, 1978

Species of moth

Aniuta melanoma is a moth in the family Oecophoridae. It was described by John Frederick Gates Clarke in 1978. It is found in Chile.

The wingspan is 12–14 mm. The forewings are greyish fuscous with scattered darker scales. In the cell, about the middle, and at the end of the cell, are fuscous spots with a fuscous bar between and slightly dorsad. At the apical third of the costa is a fuscous streak and inside that a broken fuscous shade. Around the apex and along the termen is a series of indistinct fuscous spots. The hindwings are pale greyish buff, slightly darker toward the margins.
