= Atha =

Scientific classification
- Kingdom: Animalia
- Phylum: Arthropoda
- Class: Insecta
- Order: Lepidoptera
- Family: Oecophoridae
- Subfamily: Oecophorinae
- Genus: Atha; J. F. G. Clarke, 1978
- Species: A. trimacula

Binomial name
- Atha trimacula J. F. G. Clarke, 1978

Species of moth

Atha is a monotypic moth genus in the family Oecophoridae. Its only species, Atha trimacula, is found in Chile. Both the genus and species were described by John Frederick Gates Clarke in 1978.

The wingspan is about 16 mm. The forewings are light buff overlaid with greyish fuscous, largely obscuring the lighter ground colour. There is a conspicuous, outwardly oblique, fuscous spot at the basal two-fifths, in the cell and there is a similar longitudinal blotch on the fold at the basal two-fifths. Across the end of the cell is an oblique fuscous spot. The hindwings are light greyish fuscous, paler basally.
