= Nagehana =

Scientific classification
- Kingdom: Animalia
- Phylum: Arthropoda
- Class: Insecta
- Order: Lepidoptera
- Family: Oecophoridae
- Subfamily: Oecophorinae
- Genus: Nagehana; Özdikmen, 2009

Synonyms
- Retha Clarke, 1978 (preocc. Cox, 1965)

Genus of moths

Nagehana is a genus of moths in the family Oecophoridae.

== Species ==
- Nagehana chagualphaga (Beéche, 2003)
- Nagehana elquiensis (Beéche, 2003)
- Nagehana rustica (Clarke, 1978)
