= Zymrina =

Scientific classification
- Kingdom: Animalia
- Phylum: Arthropoda
- Class: Insecta
- Order: Lepidoptera
- Family: Oecophoridae
- Subfamily: Oecophorinae
- Genus: Zymrina; Clarke, 1978
- Species: Z. xanthosema

Binomial name
- Zymrina xanthosema (Meyrick, 1931)

Synonyms
- Borkhausenia xanthosema Meyrick, 1931

Genus of moths

Zymrina is a monotypic moth genus in the family Oecophoridae erected by John Frederick Gates Clarke in 1978. Its only species, Zymrina xanthosema, was first described by Edward Meyrick in 1931. It is found in Chile.
