= Philomusaea meniscogramma =

Scientific classification
- Kingdom: Animalia
- Phylum: Arthropoda
- Class: Insecta
- Order: Lepidoptera
- Family: Oecophoridae
- Genus: Philomusaea
- Species: P. meniscogramma

Binomial name
- Philomusaea meniscogramma (J. F. G. Clarke, 1978)

Synonyms
- Philomusea meniscogramma J. F. G. Clarke, 1978

Species of moth

Philomusaea meniscogramma is a moth in the family Oecophoridae. It was described by John Frederick Gates Clarke in 1978. It is found in Chile.

The wingspan is about 14 mm. The forewings are fuscous with an outwardly curved, lunate black line from near the base of the costa, extending to the fold and for a short distance along it. The inner edge of this black line is bordered by ochraceous buff and ochraceous tawny scales. The outer edge is bordered by ochraceous tawny and between the outer end of the lunate black line and the costa, there is a black spot containing a few scattered ochraceous tawny scales. At the end of the cell is a conspicuous black spot edged with ochraceous buff and white scales, and beyond the black spot a patch of ochraceous tawny. The hindwings are fuscous apically, somewhat lighter basally.
