= Deia lineola =

Scientific classification
- Kingdom: Animalia
- Phylum: Arthropoda
- Class: Insecta
- Order: Lepidoptera
- Family: Oecophoridae
- Subfamily: Oecophorinae
- Genus: Deia; J. F. G. Clarke, 1978
- Species: D. lineola

Binomial name
- Deia lineola J. F. G. Clarke, 1978

Species of moth

Deia lineola is a moth in the family Oecophoridae, the only species in the genus Deia. It was described by John Frederick Gates Clarke in 1978. It is found in Chile.

The wingspan is 11–12 mm. The forewings are blackish fuscous, from the middle of the costa to the dorsum a broad white fascia with scattered blackish-fuscous scales and from the apical fourth of the costa to the tornus a straight, white, transverse line. Beyond this line, a patch of olivaceous-grey scales is found and the termen is narrowly white. The hindwings are light grey, somewhat darker toward the margins.
