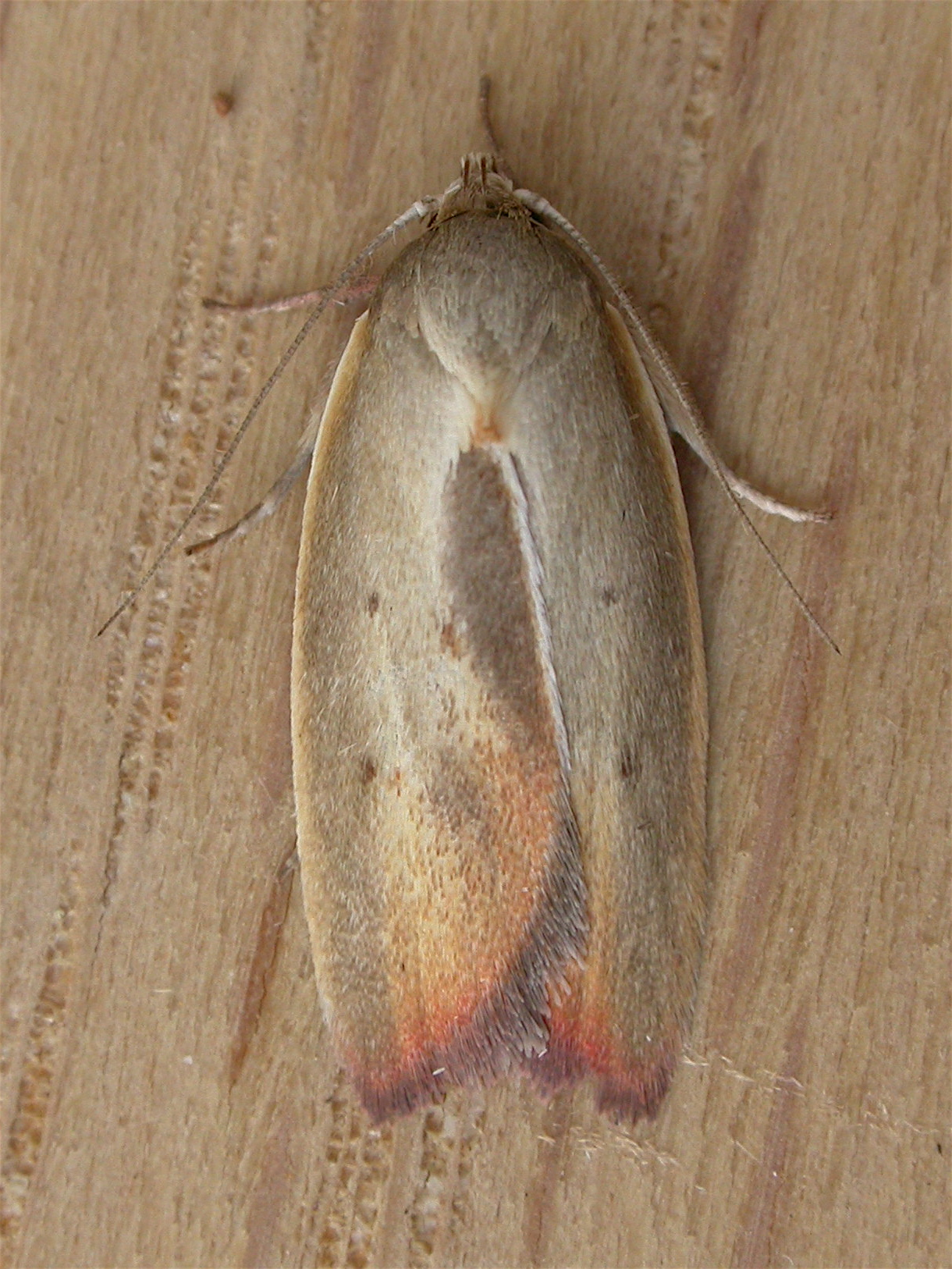

Scientific classification
- Kingdom: Animalia
- Phylum: Arthropoda
- Class: Insecta
- Order: Lepidoptera
- Family: Oecophoridae
- Subfamily: Oecophorinae
- Genus: Ptyoptila; Turner, 1946
- Species: P. matutinella

Binomial name
- Ptyoptila matutinella (Walker, 1864)

Synonyms
- Oecophora matutinella Walker, 1864; Cryptolechia marginella Walker, 1864; Machimia miltosticha Turner, 1946

= Ptyoptila =

Genus of moths

Ptyoptila is a monotypic moth genus of the family Oecophoridae described by Alfred Jefferis Turner in 1946. Its only species, Ptyoptila matutinella, was described by Francis Walker in 1864. It is found in Australia, where it has been recorded from Queensland, New South Wales, the Australian Capital Territory and Victoria.
