= Aliciana =

Scientific classification
- Kingdom: Animalia
- Phylum: Arthropoda
- Class: Insecta
- Order: Lepidoptera
- Family: Oecophoridae
- Subfamily: Oecophorinae
- Genus: Aliciana; Clarke, 1978

Genus of moths

Aliciana is a genus of moths in the family Oecophoridae.

== Species ==
- Aliciana albella (Blanchard, 1852)
- Aliciana geminata Clarke, 1978
- Aliciana longclasper Beéche, 2005
