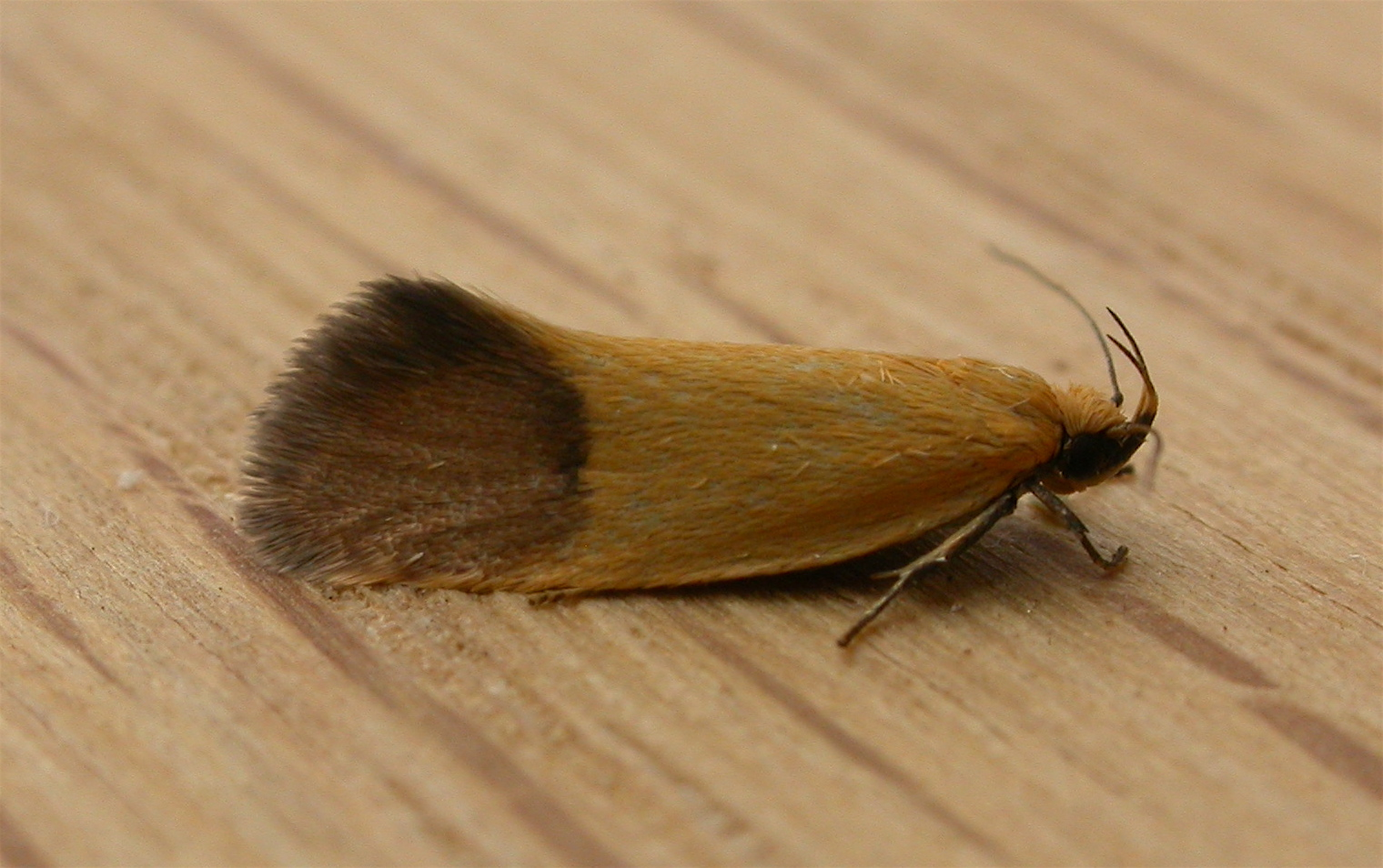

Scientific classification
- Kingdom: Animalia
- Phylum: Arthropoda
- Clade: Pancrustacea
- Class: Insecta
- Order: Lepidoptera
- Family: Oecophoridae
- Subfamily: Oecophorinae
- Genus: Merocroca; Common, 1997
- Species: M. automima

Binomial name
- Merocroca automima (Meyrick, 1889)

= Merocroca =

Genus of moths

Merocroca automima is a moth of the family Oecophoridae. It is the only species in the genus Merocroca. It is found in southeastern Australia. Adults are primarily yellow or light brown in coloration with large brown distal areas on the forewings and dark brown hindwings. Most adult activity occurs during the months of October and November.
