= Irenia curvula =

Scientific classification
- Kingdom: Animalia
- Phylum: Arthropoda
- Class: Insecta
- Order: Lepidoptera
- Family: Oecophoridae
- Genus: Irenia
- Species: I. curvula

Binomial name
- Irenia curvula J. F. G. Clarke, 1978

Species of moth

Irenia curvula is a moth in the family Oecophoridae. It was described by John Frederick Gates Clarke in 1978. It is found in Chile.

The wingspan is about 21 mm. The forewings are ocheraceous buff with the costa, especially toward the apex, sayal brown. The hindwings are straw color with slight brownish suffusion toward the apex.
