= Revonda =

Scientific classification
- Kingdom: Animalia
- Phylum: Arthropoda
- Class: Insecta
- Order: Lepidoptera
- Family: Oecophoridae
- Subfamily: Oecophorinae
- Genus: Revonda; J. F. G. Clarke, 1978
- Species: R. eschara

Binomial name
- Revonda eschara J. F. G. Clarke, 1978

Species of moth

Revonda is a monotypic moth genus in the family Oecophoridae. Its only species, Revonda eschara, is found in Chile. Both the genus and species were described by John Frederick Gates Clarke in 1978.

The wingspan is 17–21 mm. The forewings are ocherous white on the costa with three blackish fuscous spots, one at the base, one at the middle and one slightly before the apex. The dorsal two-thirds of the wing are lightly shaded greyish and there is a longitudinal shade from the end of the cell, somewhat darker than the greyish dorsal shade. On the fold, at two-fifths, a loose aggregation of fuscous scales forms an ill-defined longitudinal dash and there is a fuscous spot at the end of the cell. Scattered over the surface are irregularly placed fuscous scales. The hindwings are grey.
