= Phloeograptis =

Scientific classification
- Kingdom: Animalia
- Phylum: Arthropoda
- Class: Insecta
- Order: Lepidoptera
- Family: Oecophoridae
- Subfamily: Oecophorinae
- Genus: Phloeograptis; Meyrick, 1904

Synonyms
- Paracharactis Meyrick, 1918; Parasophista Meyrick, 1935; Epicharactis Turner, 1946

Genus of moths

Phloeograptis is a genus of moths in the family Oecophoridae.

== Species ==
- Phloeograptis macrynta Meyrick, 1904
- Phloeograptis metrionoma (Meyrick, 1928)
- Phloeograptis obliquata (Lucas, 1900)
- Phloeograptis pachnias (Meyrick, 1902)
- Phloeograptis spodopasta (Lower, 1920)
- Phloeograptis zopherota Meyrick, 1904
