= Platactis =

Scientific classification
- Kingdom: Animalia
- Phylum: Arthropoda
- Class: Insecta
- Order: Lepidoptera
- Family: Oecophoridae
- Subfamily: Oecophorinae
- Genus: Platactis; Meyrick, 1897
- Species: P. hormathota

Binomial name
- Platactis hormathota Meyrick, 1911

Genus of moths

Platactis is a genus of moths of the family Oecophoridae of moths. There is only one species in this genus of moths: Platactis hormathota Meyrick, 1911 that is found in the Seychelles.

One fact about this species of moth is that it has a wingspan of 16-18mm.
