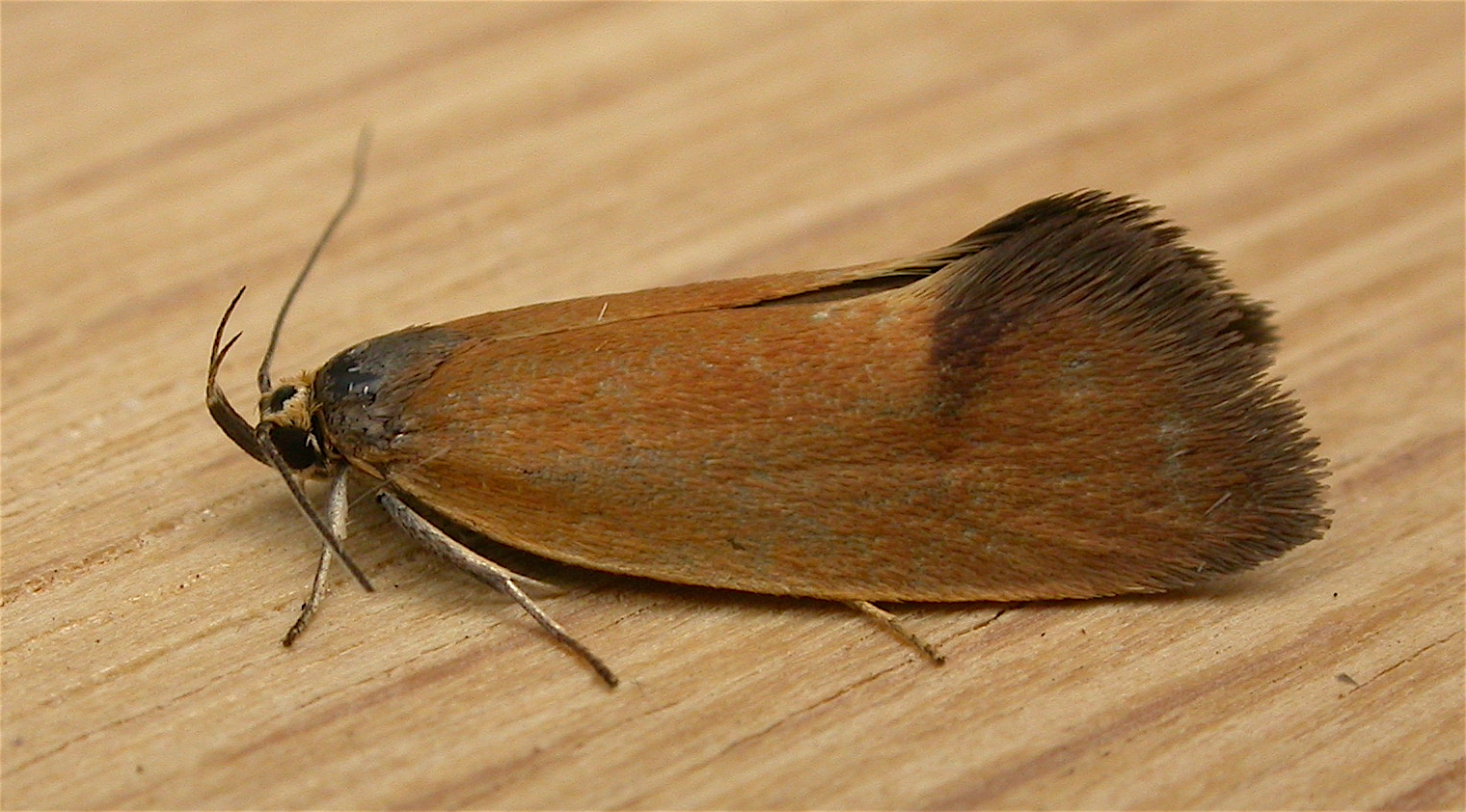

Scientific classification
- Kingdom: Animalia
- Phylum: Arthropoda
- Class: Insecta
- Order: Lepidoptera
- Family: Oecophoridae
- Subfamily: Oecophorinae
- Genus: Delexocha; Common, 1997
- Species: D. ochrocausta

Binomial name
- Delexocha ochrocausta Meyrick, 1884

Synonyms
- Leistomorpha ochrocausta Meyrick, 1884

= Delexocha =

Genus of moths

Delexocha is a monotypic moth genus in the family Oecophoridae erected by Ian Francis Bell Common in 1997. Its only species, Delexocha ochrocausta, was first described by Edward Meyrick in 1884. It is found in Australian in Queensland, New South Wales, the Australian Capital Territory and Victoria.
