= Peleopoda lobitarsis =

Scientific classification
- Kingdom: Animalia
- Phylum: Arthropoda
- Clade: Pancrustacea
- Class: Insecta
- Order: Lepidoptera
- Family: Depressariidae
- Genus: Peleopoda
- Species: P. lobitarsis

Binomial name
- Peleopoda lobitarsis Zeller, 1877

Species of moth

Peleopoda lobitarsis is a moth in the family Depressariidae. It was described by Philipp Christoph Zeller in 1877. It is found in Panama.
