= Utilia florinda =

Scientific classification
- Kingdom: Animalia
- Phylum: Arthropoda
- Class: Insecta
- Order: Lepidoptera
- Family: Oecophoridae
- Genus: Utilia
- Species: U. florinda

Binomial name
- Utilia florinda J. F. G. Clarke, 1978

Species of moth

Utilia florinda is a moth in the family Oecophoridae. It was described by John Frederick Gates Clarke in 1978. It is found in Chile.

The wingspan is 24–26 mm. The forewings are pale yellow orange and there is an ill-defined ochraceous-buff spot in the middle of the cell. At the end of the cell is a similar, larger spot. The hindwings are very pale buff.
