= Altiura =

Scientific classification
- Kingdom: Animalia
- Phylum: Arthropoda
- Class: Insecta
- Order: Lepidoptera
- Family: Oecophoridae
- Subfamily: Oecophorinae
- Genus: Altiura; J. F. G. Clarke, 1978
- Species: A. maculata

Binomial name
- Altiura maculata J. F. G. Clarke, 1978

Genus of moths

Altiura maculata is a moth in the family Oecophoridae and the only species in the genus Altiura. It was described by John Frederick Gates Clarke in 1978. It is found in Chile.

The wingspan is 21–22 mm. The forewings are light orange yellow with the basal fifth of the costa broadly tawny with a violaceous tinge. There is a similarly colored spot on the middle of the costa. The hindwings are ocherous white.
