= Melochrysis =

Scientific classification
- Kingdom: Animalia
- Phylum: Arthropoda
- Class: Insecta
- Order: Lepidoptera
- Family: Oecophoridae
- Subfamily: Oecophorinae
- Genus: Melochrysis; Meyrick, 1916
- Species: M. heliaca

Binomial name
- Melochrysis heliaca Meyrick, 1916

Monotypic moth genus

Melochrysis heliaca is a moth of the family Oecophoridae and the only species in the genus Melochrysis. It is found in Guyana.

The wingspan is about 13 mm for males and 16–17 mm for females. The forewings are deep ochreous-orange and the hindwings are whitish-orange-ochreous.
