= Eraina =

Scientific classification
- Kingdom: Animalia
- Phylum: Arthropoda
- Class: Insecta
- Order: Lepidoptera
- Family: Oecophoridae
- Subfamily: Oecophorinae
- Genus: Eraina; J. F. G. Clarke, 1978

Genus of moths

Eraina is a genus of moths in the family Oecophoridae erected by John Frederick Gates Clarke in 1978. All the species are found in Chile.

== Species ==
- Eraina thamnocephala Clarke, 1978
- Eraina stilifera Urra, 2015
- Eraina ungulifera Urra, 2015
- Eraina furcifera Urra, 2015
