= Pycnotarsa sulphurea =

Scientific classification
- Kingdom: Animalia
- Phylum: Arthropoda
- Clade: Pancrustacea
- Class: Insecta
- Order: Lepidoptera
- Family: Oecophoridae
- Genus: Pycnotarsa
- Species: P. sulphurea

Binomial name
- Pycnotarsa sulphurea (Busck, 1914)

Synonyms
- Cryptolechia sulphurea Busck, 1914; Machimia sulphurea Busck, 1914

Species of moth

Pycnotarsa sulphurea is a moth in the family Oecophoridae. It was described by August Busck in 1914. It is found in Panama.

The wingspan is about 30 mm. The forewings are glossy white with a strong violet sheen and overlaid with yellow scales. The extreme base of the costa, a longitudinal central line from the base to the termen and the apical edge are all reddish yellow. The hindwings are glistening light violet yellow.
