= Aliciana geminata =

Scientific classification
- Kingdom: Animalia
- Phylum: Arthropoda
- Class: Insecta
- Order: Lepidoptera
- Family: Oecophoridae
- Genus: Aliciana
- Species: A. geminata

Binomial name
- Aliciana geminata J. F. G. Clarke, 1978

Species of moth

Aliciana geminata is a moth in the family Oecophoridae. It was described by John Frederick Gates Clarke in 1978. It is found in Chile.

The wingspan is about 22 mm. The forewings are pale orange buff with the extreme edge of the costa black basally. The surface of the forewing is sparsely irrorated (sprinkled) with black and grey scales especially in the costal half. The hindwings are pale ochraceous buff, slightly more yellowish toward the margins.
