= Philomusaea =

Scientific classification
- Kingdom: Animalia
- Phylum: Arthropoda
- Clade: Pancrustacea
- Class: Insecta
- Order: Lepidoptera
- Family: Oecophoridae
- Subfamily: Oecophorinae
- Genus: Philomusaea; Meyrick, 1931

Synonyms
- Philomusea Clarke, 1978

Genus of moths

Philomusaea is a genus of moths in the family Oecophoridae.

== Species ==
- Philomusaea brachyxista Meyrick, 1931
- Philomusaea craterias Meyrick, 1931
- Philomusaea elissa Meyrick, 1931
- Philomusaea incommoda Meyrick, 1931
- Philomusaea meniscogramma (Clarke, 1978)
