= Pycnotarsa =

Scientific classification
- Kingdom: Animalia
- Phylum: Arthropoda
- Class: Insecta
- Order: Lepidoptera
- Family: Oecophoridae
- Subfamily: Oecophorinae
- Genus: Pycnotarsa; Meyrick, 1920

Species
- See text.

Genus of moths

Pycnotarsa is a genus of moths of the family Oecophoridae.

== Species ==
- Pycnotarsa hydrochroa Meyrick, 1920
- Pycnotarsa sulphurea (Busck, 1914)
