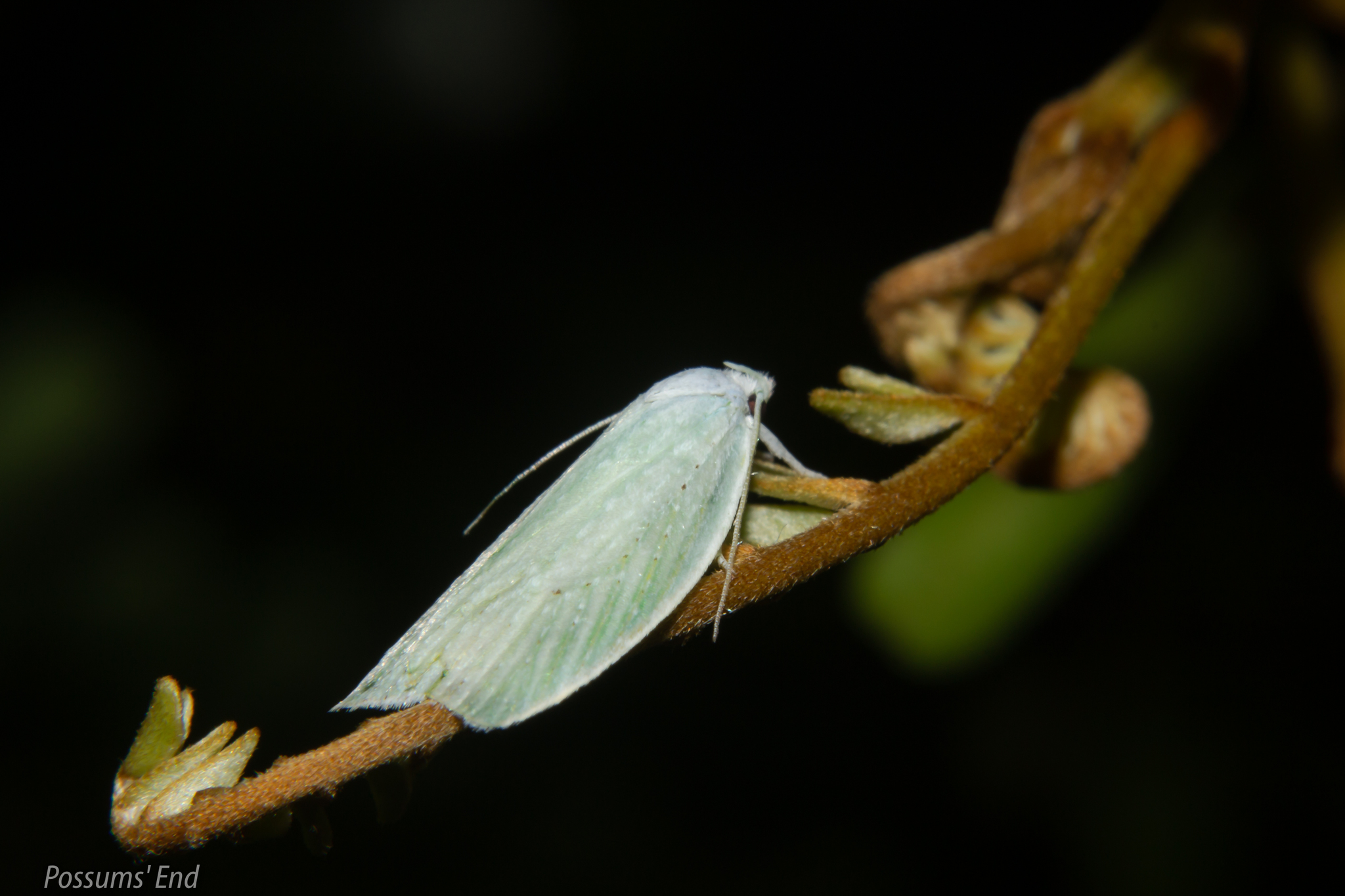
- On a kōwhai shoot

Scientific classification
- Kingdom: Animalia
- Phylum: Arthropoda
- Clade: Pancrustacea
- Class: Insecta
- Order: Lepidoptera
- Family: Oecophoridae
- Genus: Nymphostola; Meyrick, 1883
- Species: N. galactina

Binomial name
- Nymphostola galactina (C. Felder, R. Felder & Rogenhofer, 1875)

= Nymphostola =

Nymphostola galactina

Genus of moths

Nymphostola is a monotypic moth genus in the family Oecophoridae or the family Depressariidae. The genus was erected by Edward Meyrick in 1883. Its only species, Nymphostola galactina, the tarata flat moth, was described by Cajetan Felder, Rudolf Felder and Alois Friedrich Rogenhofer in 1875. It is endemic to New Zealand.

For both males and females, the wingspan is between 23 and 26 mm. The head, palpi, antennae, thorax, abdomen, and legs are snow white. The forewings are broad, the costa strongly arched, the apex obtuse, hindmargin straight, while not oblique; white, with a faint greenish or emerald tinge between the veins; all the veins are marked at regular intervals with faint minute dark grey dots. There is a more conspicuous dark grey dot in disc beyond the middle, and a very slender indistinct dark grey hindmarginal line: cilia white. The hindwings and cilia are white. Considered a very delicate and conspicuously distinct species.
