= Lelita =

Scientific classification
- Kingdom: Animalia
- Phylum: Arthropoda
- Class: Insecta
- Order: Lepidoptera
- Family: Oecophoridae
- Genus: Lelita; J. F. G. Clarke, 1978
- Species: L. acmaea

Binomial name
- Lelita acmaea J. F. G. Clarke, 1978

Species of moth

Lelita is a monotypic moth genus of the family Oecophoridae. Its only species, Lelita acmaea, is found in Chile. Both the genus and species were described by John Frederick Gates Clarke in 1978.

The wingspan is about 12.5 mm. The forewings are blackish fuscous with at the apex a triangular, ochraceous-orange patch. The base of the triangle is edged with black scales. The hindwings are fuscous.
