= Baioglossa =

Scientific classification
- Domain: Eukaryota
- Kingdom: Animalia
- Phylum: Arthropoda
- Class: Insecta
- Order: Lepidoptera
- Family: Oecophoridae
- Subfamily: Oecophorinae
- Genus: Baioglossa; Common, 2000
- Species: B. anisopasta

Binomial name
- Baioglossa anisopasta (Turner, 1935)

Synonyms
- Eclactistis anisopasta Turner 1935

Species of moth

Baioglossa is an Australian genus of moths of the family Oecophoridae.

There is only one species in this genus: Baioglossa anisopasta (Turner 1935).
