= Guestia (moth) =

Scientific classification
- Kingdom: Animalia
- Phylum: Arthropoda
- Clade: Pancrustacea
- Class: Insecta
- Order: Lepidoptera
- Family: Oecophoridae
- Subfamily: Oecophorinae
- Genus: Guestia; Meyrick, 1889

Species
- Guestia asphaltis Guestia uniformis

Genus of moths

Guestia is a concealer moth genus in the subfamily Oecophorinae.
