= Peleopoda =

Scientific classification
- Kingdom: Animalia
- Phylum: Arthropoda
- Clade: Pancrustacea
- Class: Insecta
- Order: Lepidoptera
- Family: Depressariidae
- Genus: Peleopoda; Zeller, 1877

Synonyms
- Theatria Walsingham, 1912

Genus of moths

Peleopoda is a moth genus of the family Depressariidae.

== Species ==
- Peleopoda irenella Busck
- Peleopoda lobitarsis Zeller, 1877
- Peleopoda marioniella Busck
- Peleopoda navigatrix (Meyrick, 1912)
- Peleopoda notandella Busck
- Peleopoda spudasma (Walsingham, 1912)
- Peleopoda semocrossa Meyrick, 1930
- Peleopoda convoluta Duckworth, 1970
