= Parallelomma vittatum =

Scientific classification
- Domain: Eukaryota
- Kingdom: Animalia
- Phylum: Arthropoda
- Class: Insecta
- Order: Diptera
- Family: Scathophagidae
- Genus: Parallelomma
- Species: P. vittatum

Binomial name
- Parallelomma vittatum (Meigen, 1826)

Synonyms
- Cordilura inermis Loew, 1869; Cordilura vittatum Meigen, 1826; Parallelomma nudicornis Cresson, 1918

Species of dung fly

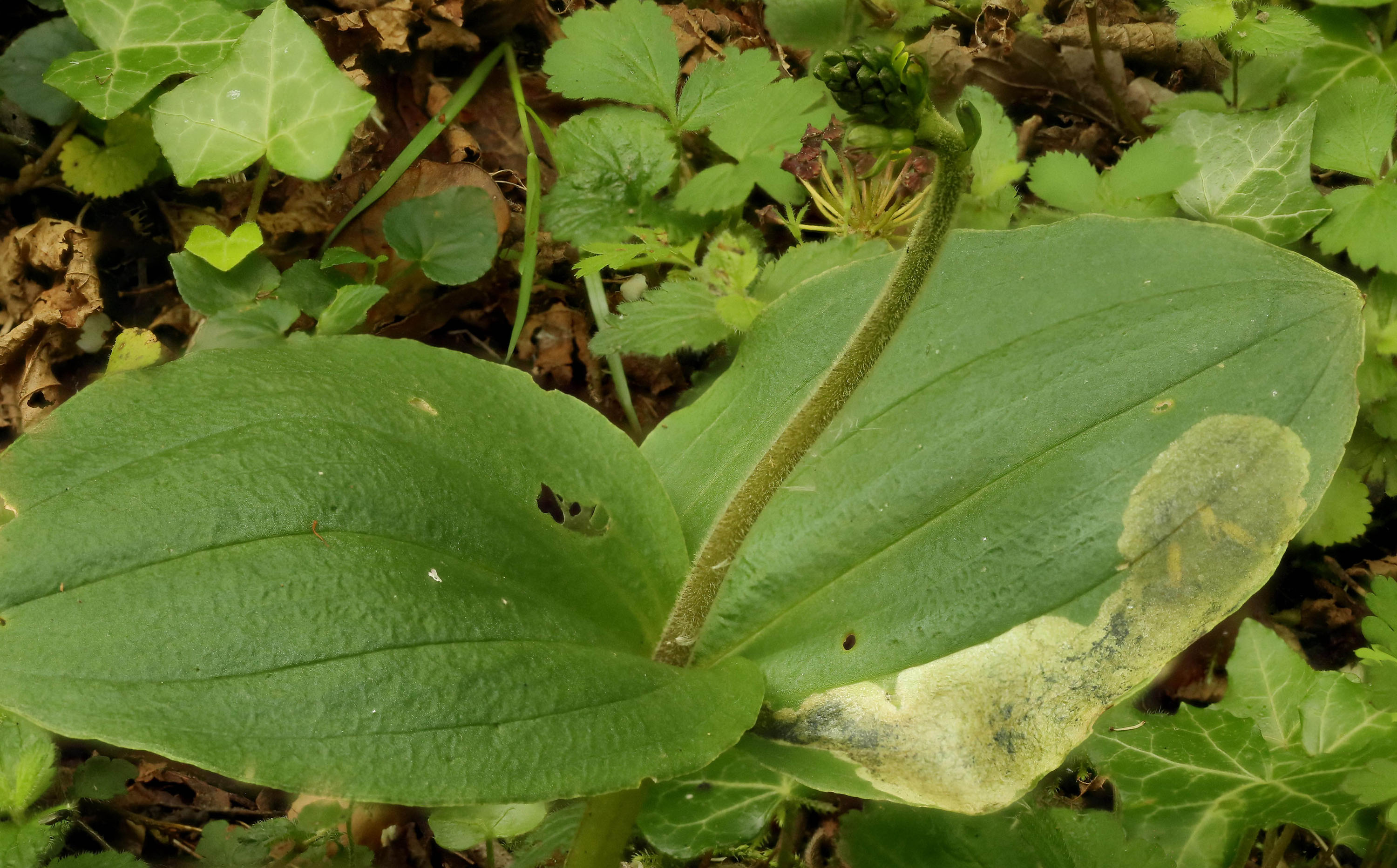

Parallelomma vittatum is a species of dung fly (insects in the family Scathophagidae). Larvae are leaf miners of numerous plants, including Maianthemum dilatatum, Polygonatum pubescens, Trillium undulatum, Cypripedium acaule, Cypripedium reginae, and others. They are active from May through October, and can have two generations in a single year.
