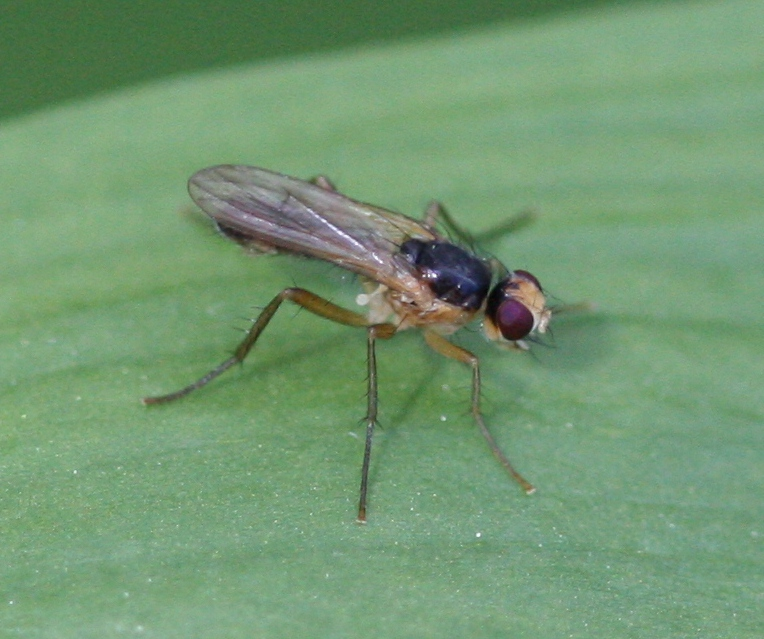
- Cordilura

Scientific classification
- Kingdom: Animalia
- Phylum: Arthropoda
- Class: Insecta
- Order: Diptera
- Family: Scathophagidae
- Subfamily: Scathophaginae

= Scathophaginae =

Subfamily of flies

Scathophaginae is a subfamily of dung flies in the family Scathophagidae. There are at least 30 genera and 130 described species in Scathophaginae.

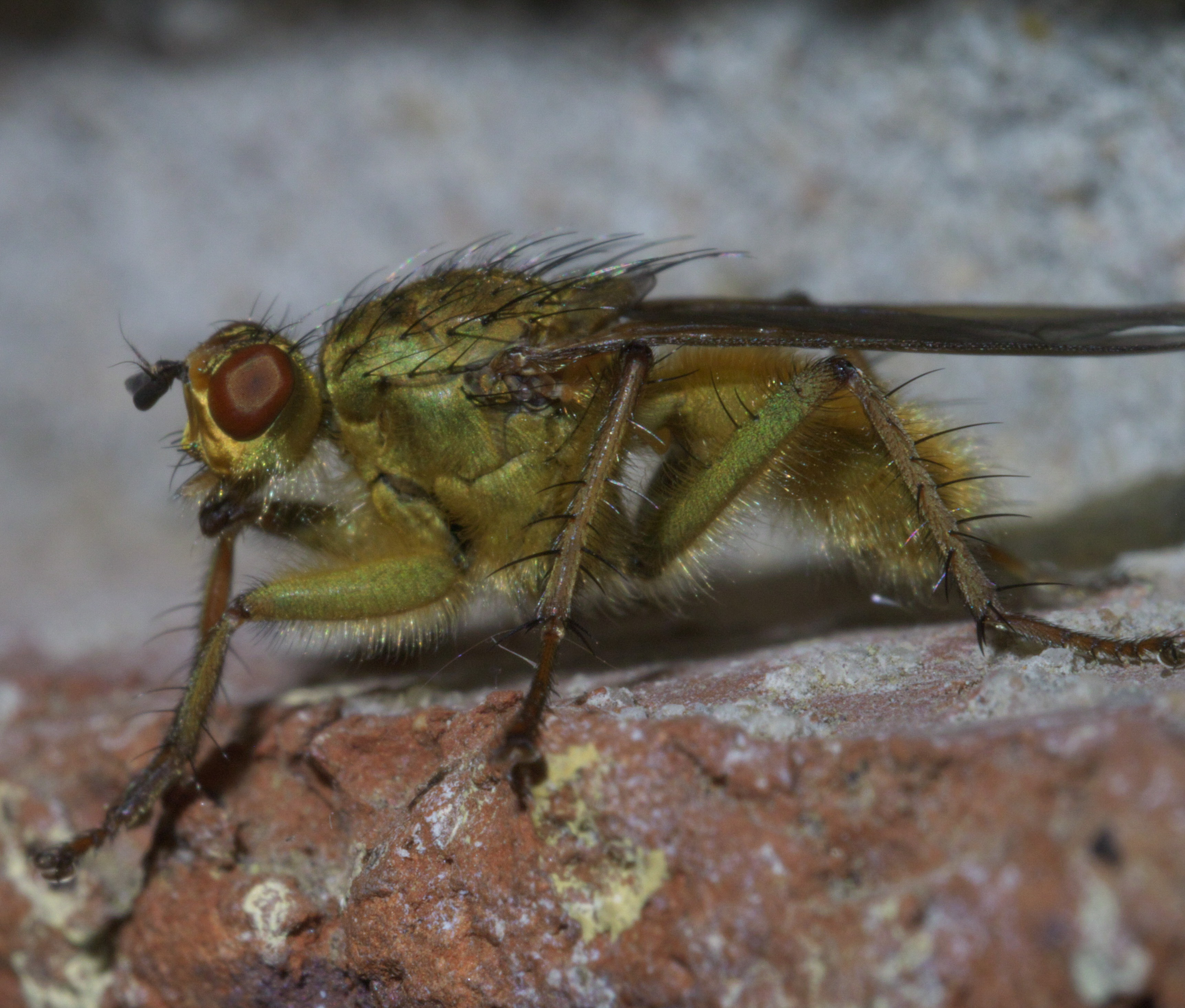
Scathophaga stercoraria

== Genera ==
These 33 genera belong to the subfamily Scathophaginae:

- Acanthocnema Becker, 1894^{i c g}
- Acerocnema Becker, 1894^{i c g}
- Allomyella Malloch, 1923^{i c g}
- Brooksiella Vockeroth, 1987^{i}
- Bucephalina Malloch, 1919^{i c g}
- Ceratinostoma Meade, 1885^{i c g b}
- Chaetosa Coquillett, 1898^{i c g}
- Cordilura Fallen, 1810^{i g b}
- Cordylurella Malloch, 1919^{i c g b}
- Cosmetopus Becker, 1894^{i c g}
- Dromogaster Vockeroth, 1995^{i}
- Ernoneura Becker, 1894^{i c g}
- Gimnomera Rondani, 1866^{i c g}
- Gonarcticus Becker, 1894^{i c g}
- Gonatherus Rondani, 1856^{i c g}
- Huckettia Vockeroth, 1995^{i}
- Hydromyza Fallen, 1813^{i c g b}
- Megaphthalma Becker, 1894^{i c g}
- Megaphthalmoides Ringdahl, 1936^{i c g}
- Microprosopa Becker, 1894^{i c g}
- Nanna Becker, 1894^{i g}
- Neorthacheta Vockeroth, 1987^{i c g}
- Norellisoma Hendel, 1910^{i c g}
- Norellia Robineau-Desvoidy, 1830^{c}
- Okeniella Hendel, 1907^{i c g}
- Orthacheta Becker, 1894^{i c g}
- Peratomyia Vockeroth, 1987^{i}
- Pleurochaetella Vockeroth, 1965^{i c g}
- Pogonota Zetterstedt, 1860^{i c g}
- Scathophaga Meigen, 1803^{i g b}
- Spaziphora Rondani, 1856^{i c g b}
- Staegeria Rondani, 1856^{i c g}
- Synchysa Vockeroth, 1987^{i}
- Trichopalpus Rondani, 1856^{i c g}

Data sources: i = ITIS, c = Catalogue of Life, g = GBIF, b = Bugguide.net
