= Spaziphora cincta =

Scientific classification
- Domain: Eukaryota
- Kingdom: Animalia
- Phylum: Arthropoda
- Class: Insecta
- Order: Diptera
- Family: Scathophagidae
- Genus: Spaziphora
- Species: S. cincta

Binomial name
- Spaziphora cincta (Loew, 1863)

Synonyms
- Cordilura cincta Loew, 1863; Spaziphora litoralis Curran, 1927

Species of dung fly

Spaziphora cincta is a species of dung fly in the family Scathophagidae.
