= Scutelliseta megalogaster =

Scientific classification
- Domain: Eukaryota
- Kingdom: Animalia
- Phylum: Arthropoda
- Class: Insecta
- Order: Diptera
- Family: Sphaeroceridae
- Genus: Scutelliseta
- Species: S. megalogaster

Binomial name
- Scutelliseta megalogaster Richards, 1969

Species of fly

Scutelliseta megalogaster is one of the smaller dung flies. This species was described by Richards in 1968. It is currently only known from Eswatini (Swaziland).
