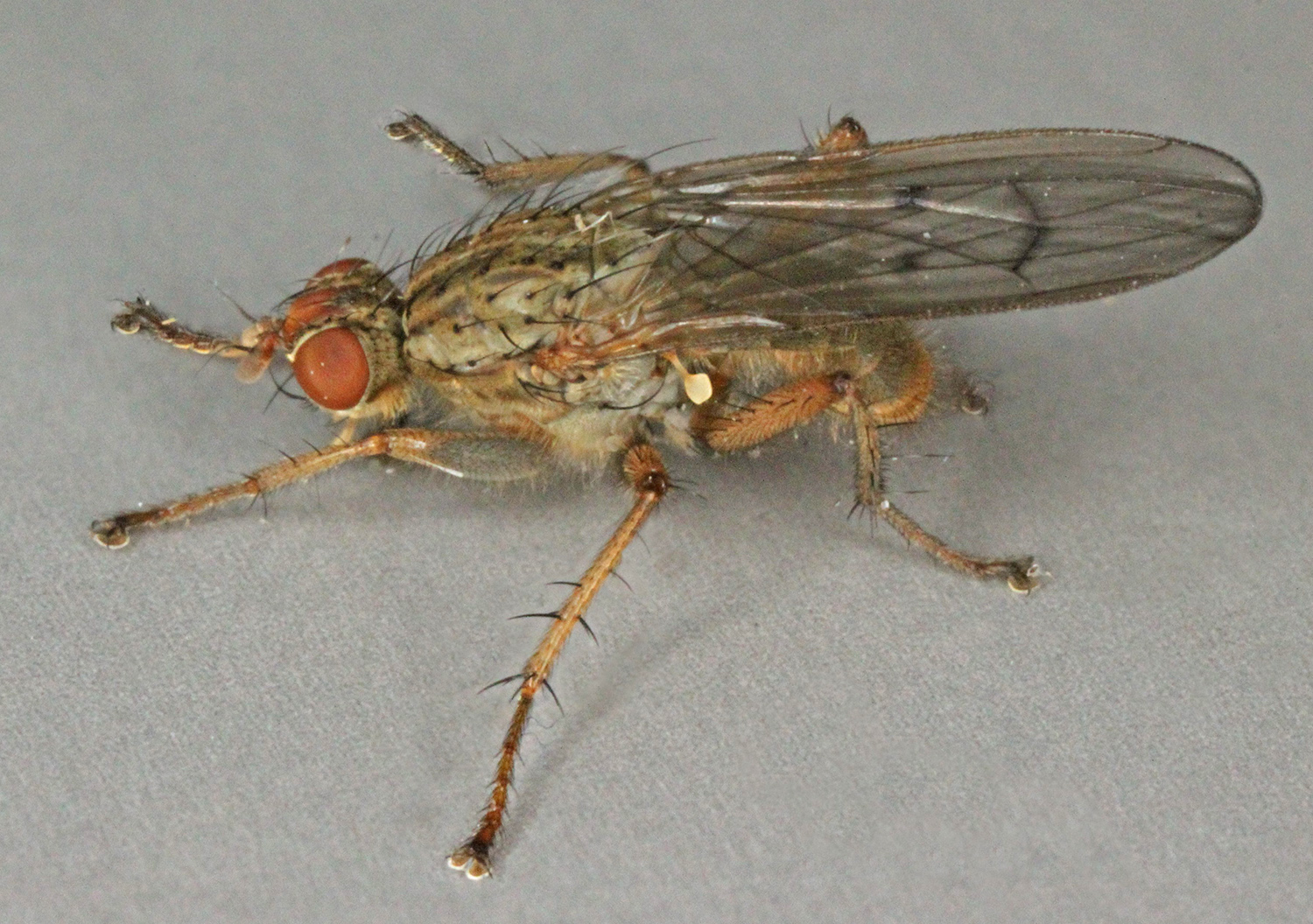
- Scathophaga furcata North Wales

Scientific classification
- Kingdom: Animalia
- Phylum: Arthropoda
- Class: Insecta
- Order: Diptera
- Family: Scathophagidae
- Genus: Scathophaga
- Species: S. furcata

Binomial name
- Scathophaga furcata (Say, 1823)

= Scathophaga furcata =

Species of fly

Scathophaga furcata is a species of fly in the family Scathophagidae. It is found in the Palearctic.

== Ecology ==
Like others in the genus Scathophaga, S. furcata larvae feed on dung.

This species is a significant prey item in the diet of nestling snow buntings.
