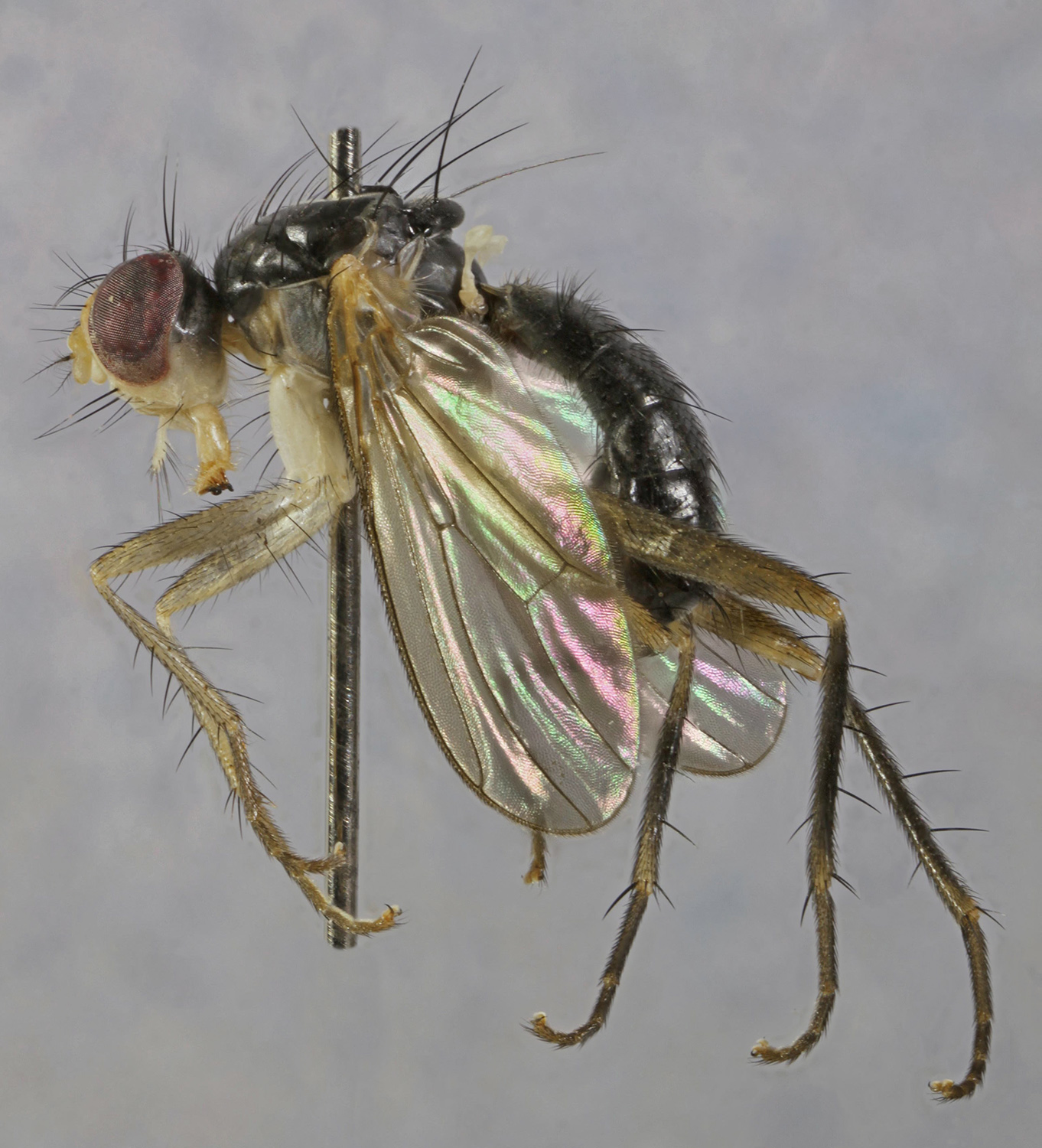
- Cordilura albipes North Wales

Scientific classification
- Kingdom: Animalia
- Phylum: Arthropoda
- Class: Insecta
- Order: Diptera
- Family: Scathophagidae
- Genus: Cordilura
- Species: C. albipes

Binomial name
- Cordilura albipes Fallén, 1819

Synonyms
- Cordylura bilineata Meigen, 1838; Cordylura bilineata Meigen 1838; Parallelomma hispanica Czerny in Strobl 1909.

= Cordilura albipes =

Species of fly

Cordilura albipes is a species of fly in the family Scathophagidae. It is found in the Palearctic.
