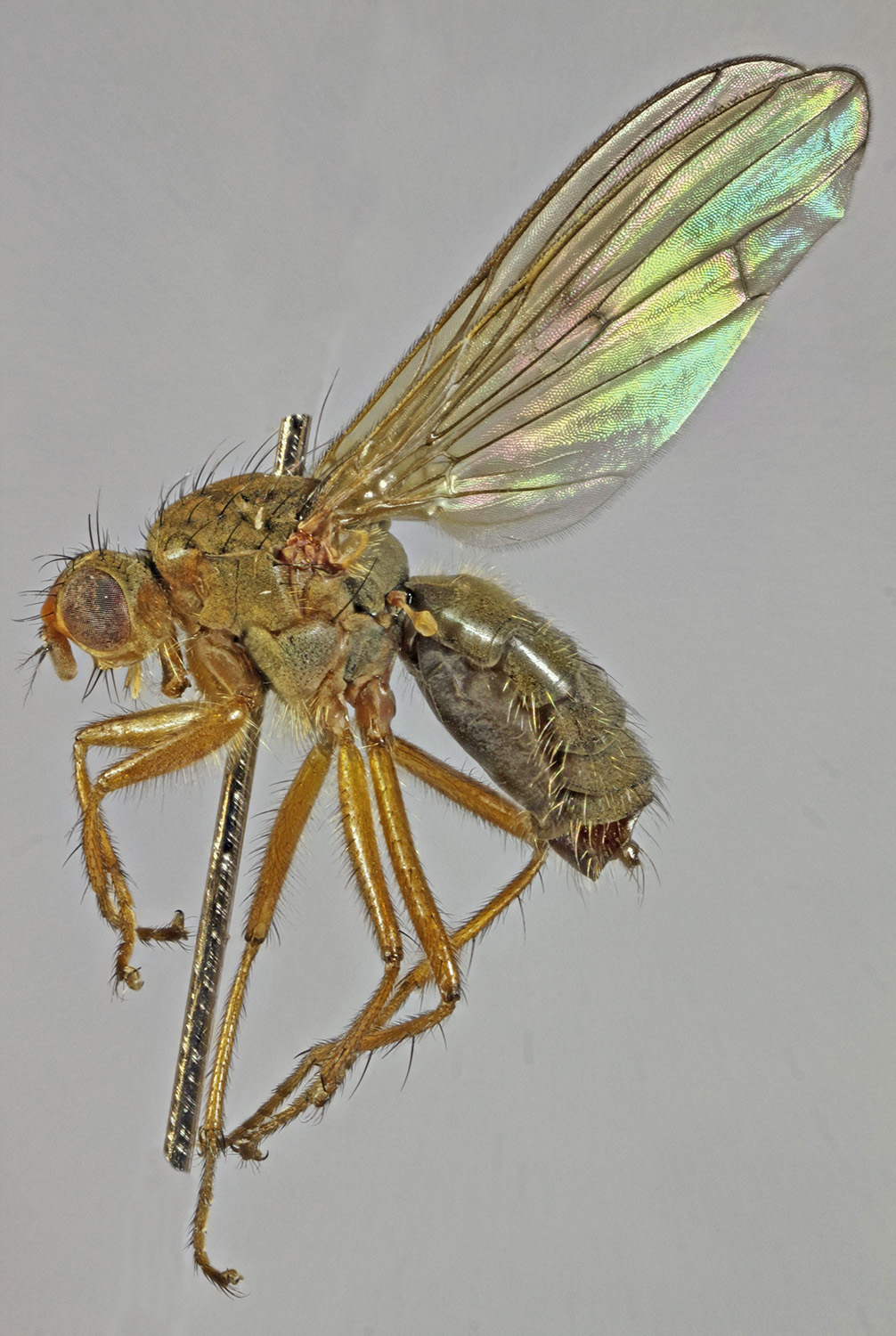
- Scathophaga suilla North Wales

Scientific classification
- Kingdom: Animalia
- Phylum: Arthropoda
- Class: Insecta
- Order: Diptera
- Family: Scathophagidae
- Genus: Scathophaga
- Species: S. suilla

Binomial name
- Scathophaga suilla (Fabricius, 1794)

= Scathophaga suilla =

Species of fly

Scathophaga suilla is a species of fly in the family Scathophagidae. It is found in the Palearctic.
