= Scathophaga intermedia =

Scientific classification
- Kingdom: Animalia
- Phylum: Arthropoda
- Class: Insecta
- Order: Diptera
- Family: Scathophagidae
- Genus: Scathophaga
- Species: S. intermedia

Binomial name
- Scathophaga intermedia (Walker, 1849)

Synonyms
- Scatophaga intermedia Walker, 1849

Species of fly

Scathophaga intermedia is a species of dung fly in the family Scathophagidae.
