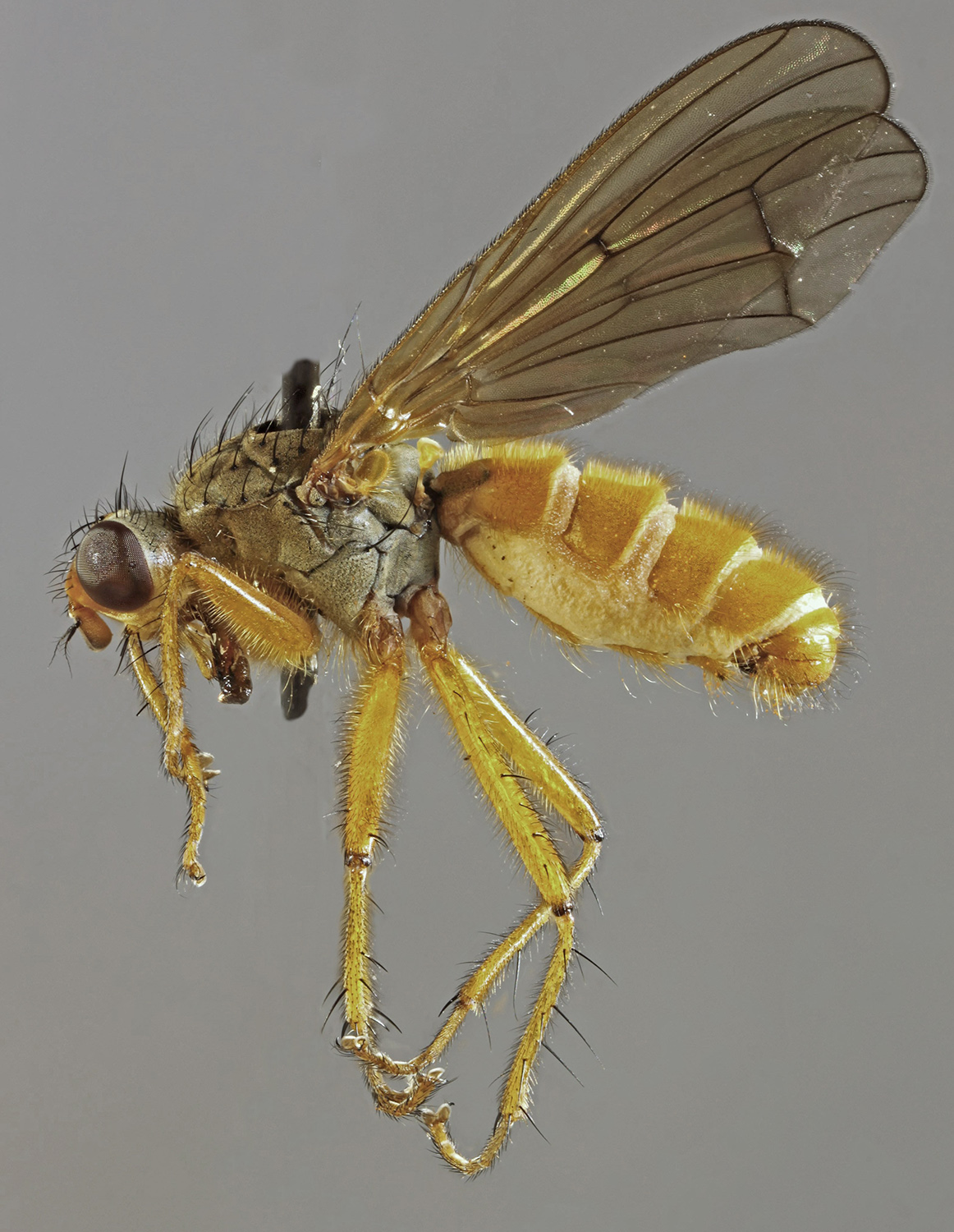
- Scathophaga inquinata North Wales

Scientific classification
- Kingdom: Animalia
- Phylum: Arthropoda
- Class: Insecta
- Order: Diptera
- Family: Scathophagidae
- Genus: Scathophaga
- Species: S. inquinata

Binomial name
- Scathophaga inquinata (Meigen, 1826)

= Scathophaga inquinata =

Species of fly

Scathophaga inquinata is a species of fly in the family Scathophagidae. It is found in the Palearctic. It has a pale, orangey brown abdomen, orange legs, and plumose arista and is often found on pond edges or in wet meadows.
