= Neochirosia nuda =

- Leafmines

Scientific classification
- Kingdom: Animalia
- Phylum: Arthropoda
- Clade: Pancrustacea
- Class: Insecta
- Order: Diptera
- Family: Scathophagidae
- Genus: Neochirosia
- Species: N. nuda

Binomial name
- Neochirosia nuda (Malloch, 1922)

Synonyms
- Amaurosoma nuda Malloch, 1922

Species of fly

Neochirosia nuda is a species of dung fly in the family Scathophagidae. It is a univoltine leaf miner of Maianthemum canadense and Polygonatum pubescens.
