= Scathophaga nigrolimbata =

Scientific classification
- Domain: Eukaryota
- Kingdom: Animalia
- Phylum: Arthropoda
- Class: Insecta
- Order: Diptera
- Family: Scathophagidae
- Genus: Scathophaga
- Species: S. nigrolimbata

Binomial name
- Scathophaga nigrolimbata (Cresson, 1918)

Synonyms
- Scatophaga nigrolimbata Cresson, 1918

Species of fly

Scathophaga nigrolimbata is a species of dung fly in the family Scathophagidae.
