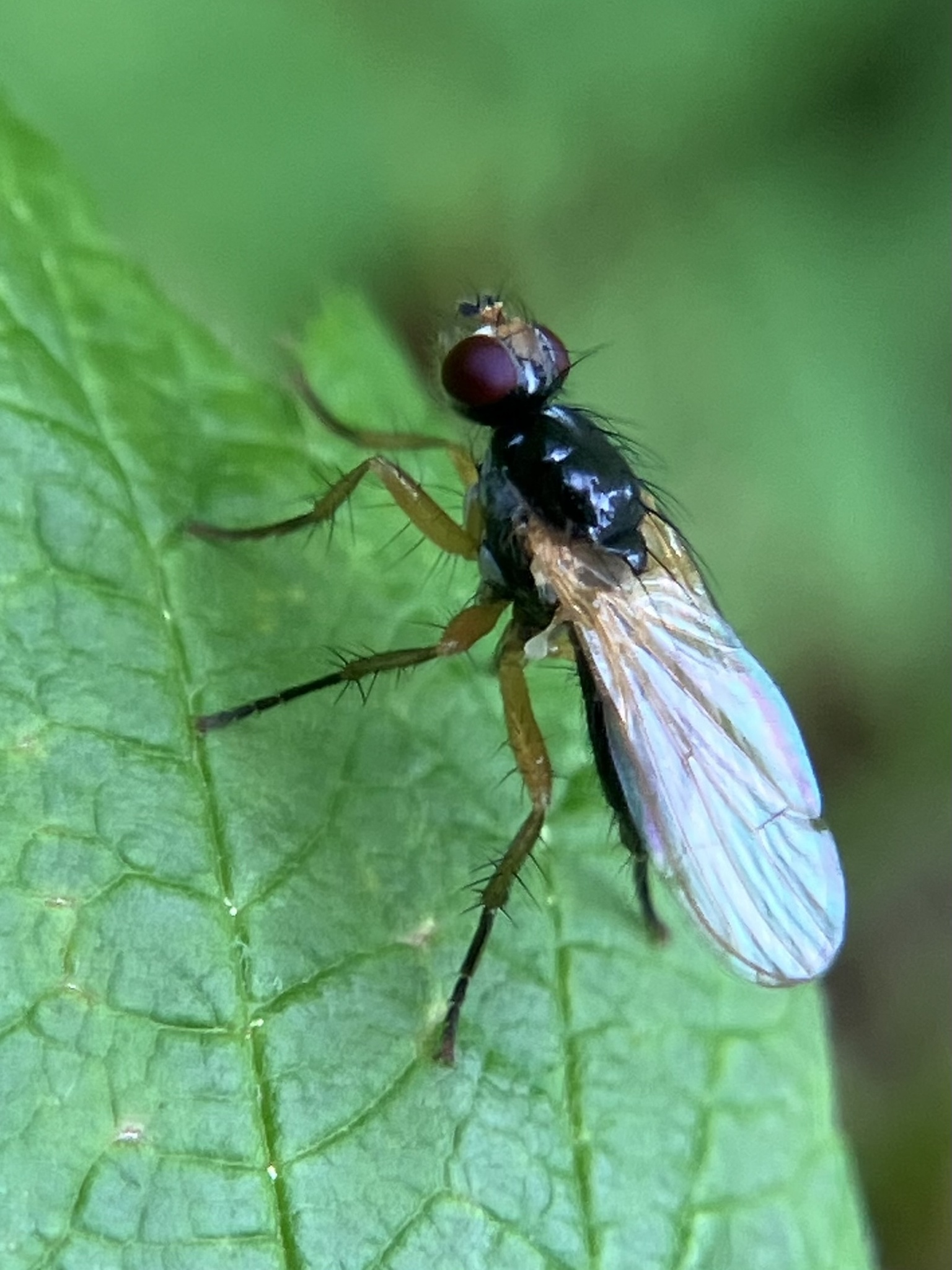

Scientific classification
- Kingdom: Animalia
- Phylum: Arthropoda
- Clade: Pancrustacea
- Class: Insecta
- Order: Diptera
- Family: Scathophagidae
- Genus: Cordilura
- Species: C. setosa

Binomial name
- Cordilura setosa Loew, 1860

= Cordilura setosa =

Species of fly

Cordilura setosa is a species of dung fly in the family Scathophagidae.
