= Pogonota barbata =

Scientific classification
- Domain: Eukaryota
- Kingdom: Animalia
- Phylum: Arthropoda
- Class: Insecta
- Order: Diptera
- Family: Scathophagidae
- Genus: Pogonota
- Species: P. barbata

Binomial name
- Pogonota barbata (Zetterstedt, 1838)

Species of fly

Pogonota barbata is a species of fly belonging to the family Scathophagidae.

It is native to Europe and Northern America.
