= Leptopa vittata =

Scientific classification
- Kingdom: Animalia
- Phylum: Arthropoda
- Clade: Pancrustacea
- Class: Insecta
- Order: Diptera
- Family: Anthomyiidae
- Genus: Leptopa
- Species: L. vittata

Binomial name
- Leptopa vittata

Species of fly

Leptopa vittata is a species of dung fly in the family Scathophagidae.

== Description ==
Leptopa vittata is a species of fly in the genus Leptopa. They typically feed on orchids.
