= Scutelliseta swaziana =

Scientific classification
- Domain: Eukaryota
- Kingdom: Animalia
- Phylum: Arthropoda
- Class: Insecta
- Order: Diptera
- Family: Sphaeroceridae
- Genus: Scutelliseta
- Species: S. swaziana

Binomial name
- Scutelliseta swaziana Richards, 1968

Species of fly

Scutelliseta swaziana is one of the smaller dung flies. This species was described by Richards in 1968. It is currently only known from Eswatini (Swaziland).
