= Cordilura emarginata =

Scientific classification
- Domain: Eukaryota
- Kingdom: Animalia
- Phylum: Arthropoda
- Class: Insecta
- Order: Diptera
- Family: Scathophagidae
- Genus: Cordilura
- Species: C. emarginata

Binomial name
- Cordilura emarginata (Malloch, 1923)

Synonyms
- Parallelomma dorsalis Malloch, 1923; Parallelomma emarginata Malloch, 1923

Species of fly

Cordilura emarginata is a species of dung fly in the family Scathophagidae.
