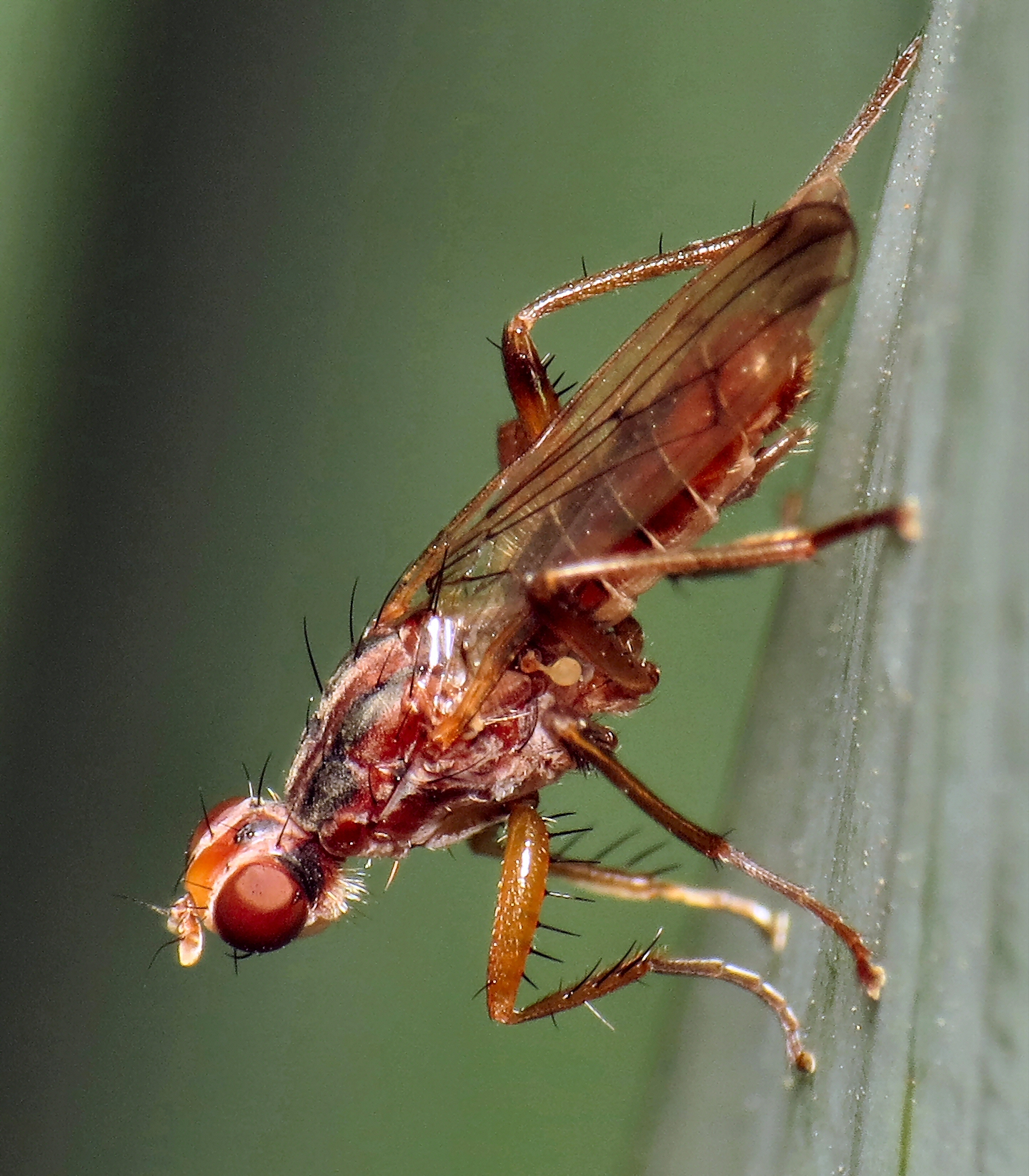

Scientific classification
- Kingdom: Animalia
- Phylum: Arthropoda
- Class: Insecta
- Order: Diptera
- Family: Scathophagidae
- Subfamily: Scathophaginae
- Genus: Norellia
- Species: N. spinipes

Binomial name
- Norellia spinipes Meigen, 1826

= Norellia spinipes =

Species of fly

Norellia spinipes is a species of fly of the family Scathophagidae described by Johann Wilhelm Meigen in 1826.
