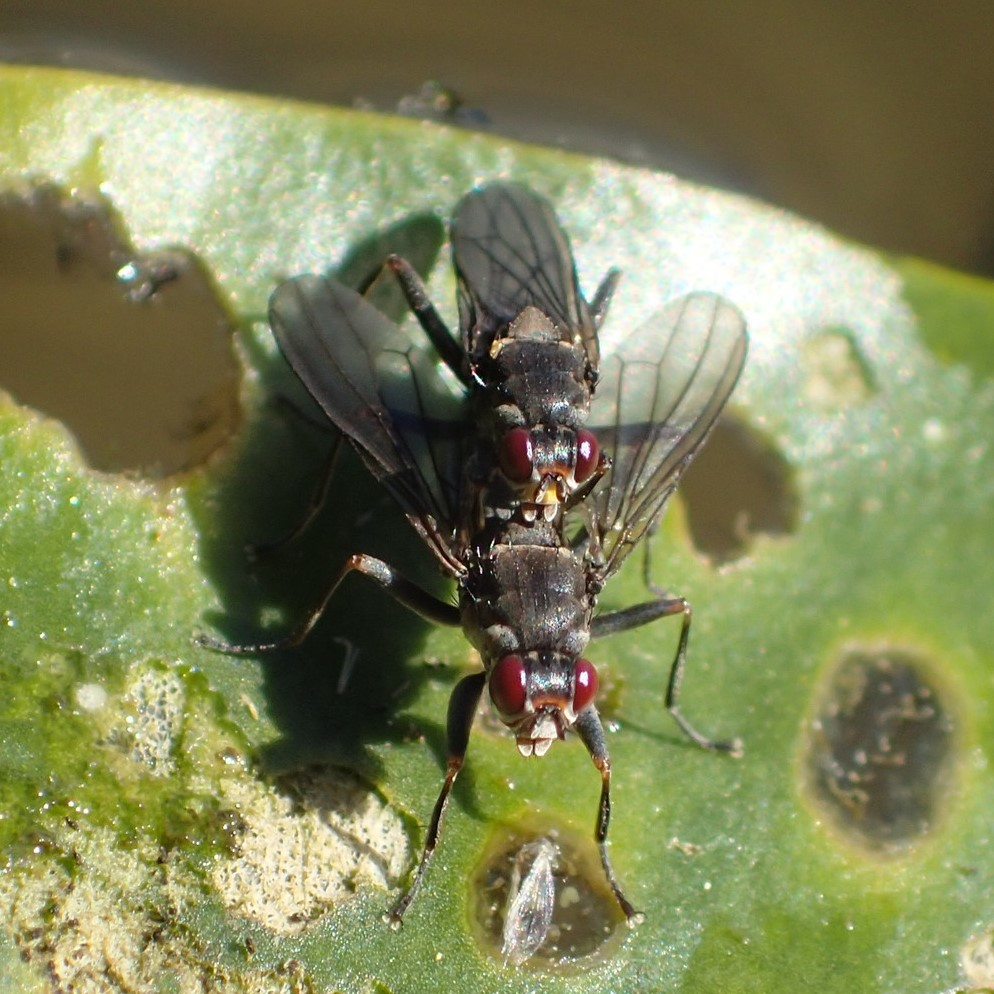

Scientific classification
- Domain: Eukaryota
- Kingdom: Animalia
- Phylum: Arthropoda
- Class: Insecta
- Order: Diptera
- Family: Scathophagidae
- Genus: Hydromyza
- Species: H. confluens

Binomial name
- Hydromyza confluens Loew, 1863

= Hydromyza confluens =

Species of fly

Hydromyza confluens is a species of dung fly in the family Scathophagidae.
