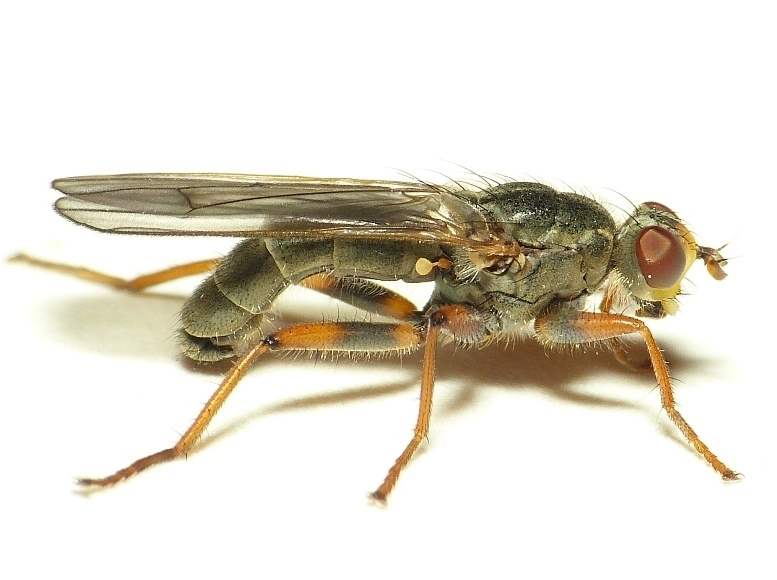
- Spaziphora hydromyzina Netherlands

Scientific classification
- Domain: Eukaryota
- Kingdom: Animalia
- Phylum: Arthropoda
- Class: Insecta
- Order: Diptera
- Family: Scathophagidae
- Genus: Spaziphora
- Species: S. hydromyzina

Binomial name
- Spaziphora hydromyzina (Fallen, 1819)

= Spaziphora hydromyzina =

Species of fly

Spaziphora hydromyzina is a species of fly in the family Scathophagidae. It is found in the Palearctic.
