= Cordilura fuscipes =

Scientific classification
- Domain: Eukaryota
- Kingdom: Animalia
- Phylum: Arthropoda
- Class: Insecta
- Order: Diptera
- Family: Scathophagidae
- Genus: Cordilura
- Species: C. fuscipes

Binomial name
- Cordilura fuscipes Zetterstedt, 1838

Synonyms
- Cordilura browni Curran, 1931; Cordilura fulvithorax Curran, 1929; Cordilura lutea Loew, 1872; Cordilura vittipes Loew, 1872; Scatophaga pallida Walker, 1849

Species of fly

Cordilura fuscipes is a species of dung fly in the family Scathophagidae.
