= Cordilura munda =

Scientific classification
- Domain: Eukaryota
- Kingdom: Animalia
- Phylum: Arthropoda
- Class: Insecta
- Order: Diptera
- Family: Scathophagidae
- Genus: Cordilura
- Species: C. munda

Binomial name
- Cordilura munda Loew, 1869

Species of fly

Cordilura munda is a species of dung fly in the family Scathophagidae.
