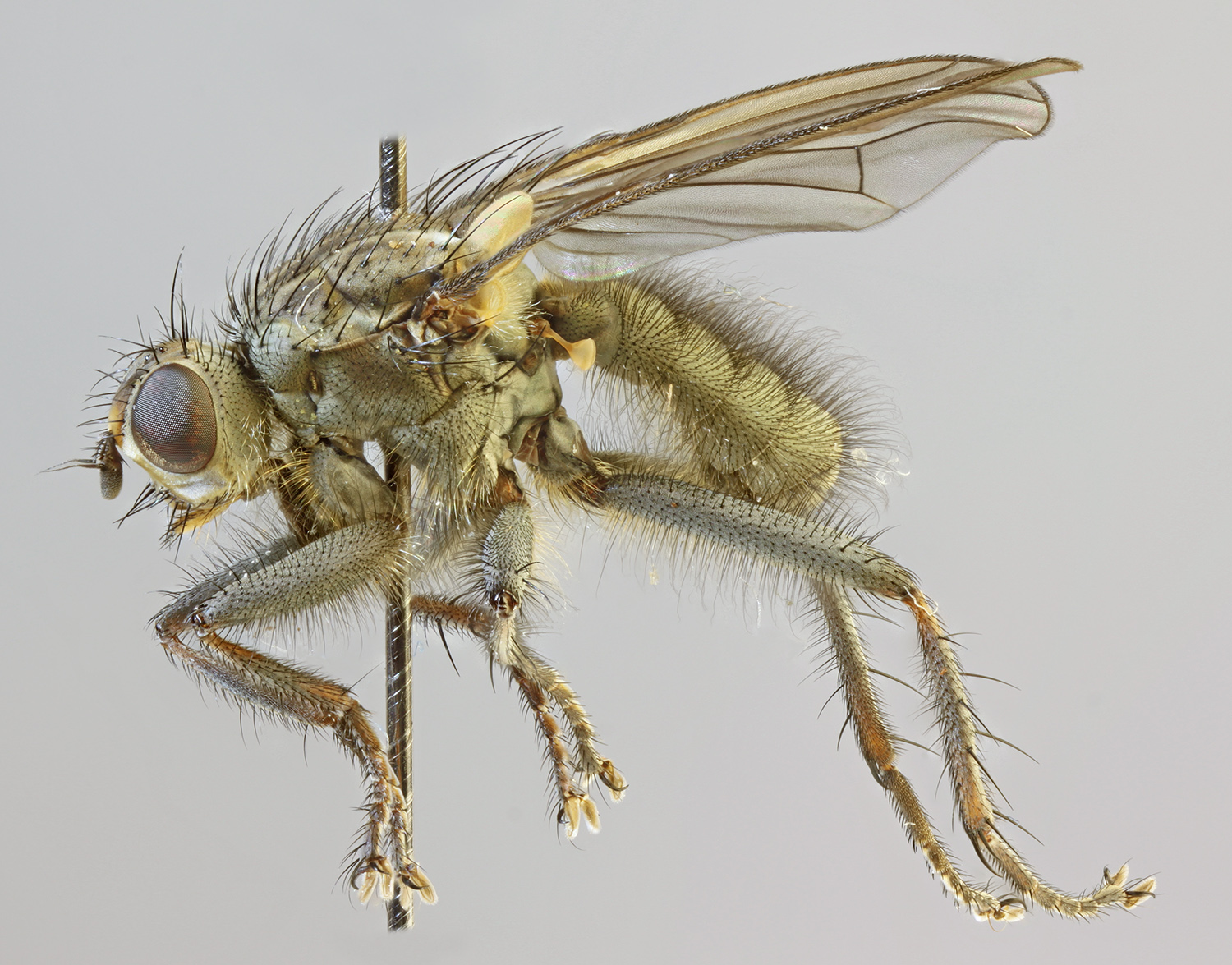
- Scathophaga litorea, North Wales

Scientific classification
- Kingdom: Animalia
- Phylum: Arthropoda
- Class: Insecta
- Order: Diptera
- Family: Scathophagidae
- Genus: Scathophaga
- Species: S. litorea

Binomial name
- Scathophaga litorea (Fallén, 1819)

= Scathophaga litorea =

Species of fly

Scathophaga litorea is a species of fly in the family Scathophagidae. It is found in the Palearctic.
