= Scathophaga reses =

Scientific classification
- Domain: Eukaryota
- Kingdom: Animalia
- Phylum: Arthropoda
- Class: Insecta
- Order: Diptera
- Family: Scathophagidae
- Genus: Scathophaga
- Species: S. reses

Binomial name
- Scathophaga reses (Giglio-tos, 1893)

Synonyms
- Scatophaga reses Giglio-tos, 1893

Species of fly

Scathophaga reses is a species of dung fly in the family Scathophagidae.
