= Scathophaga crinita =

Scientific classification
- Domain: Eukaryota
- Kingdom: Animalia
- Phylum: Arthropoda
- Class: Insecta
- Order: Diptera
- Family: Scathophagidae
- Genus: Scathophaga
- Species: S. crinita

Binomial name
- Scathophaga crinita (Coquillett, 1901)

Synonyms
- Scatophaga crinita Coquillett, 1901

Species of fly

Scathophaga crinita is a species of dung fly in the family Scathophagidae.
