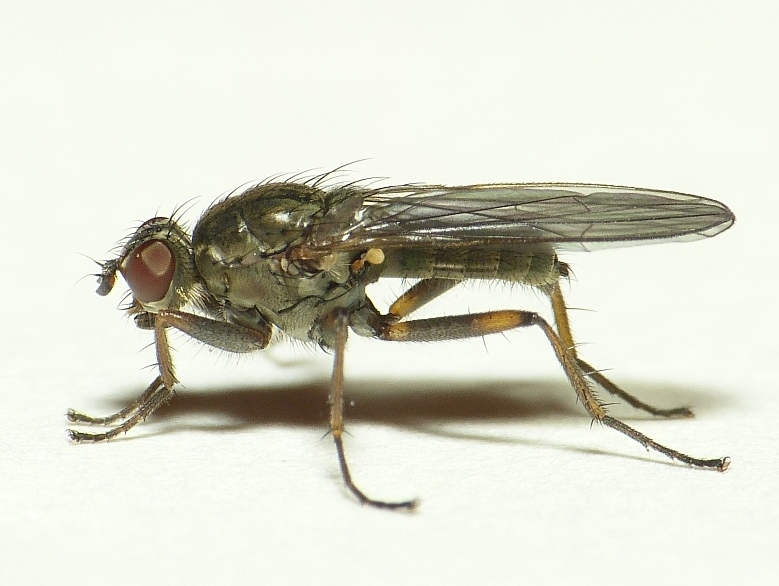
- Trichpalpus fraternus Netherlands

Scientific classification
- Kingdom: Animalia
- Phylum: Arthropoda
- Class: Insecta
- Order: Diptera
- Family: Scathophagidae
- Genus: Trichopalpus
- Species: T. fraternus

Binomial name
- Trichopalpus fraternus (Meigen, 1826)

= Trichopalpus fraternus =

Species of fly

Trichopalpus fraternus is a species of fly in the family Scathophagidae. It is found in the Palearctic.
