= Cordilura varipes =

Scientific classification
- Kingdom: Animalia
- Phylum: Arthropoda
- Class: Insecta
- Order: Diptera
- Family: Scathophagidae
- Genus: Cordilura
- Species: C. varipes

Binomial name
- Cordilura varipes (Walker, 1849)

Synonyms
- Cordilura bimaculata Loew, 1860; Lissa varipes Walker, 1849

Species of fly

Cordilura varipes is a species of dung fly in the family Scathophagidae.
