= Daffodil fly =

Daffodil fly is a common name for several insects and may refer to:

- Merodon equestris
- Norellia spinipes
