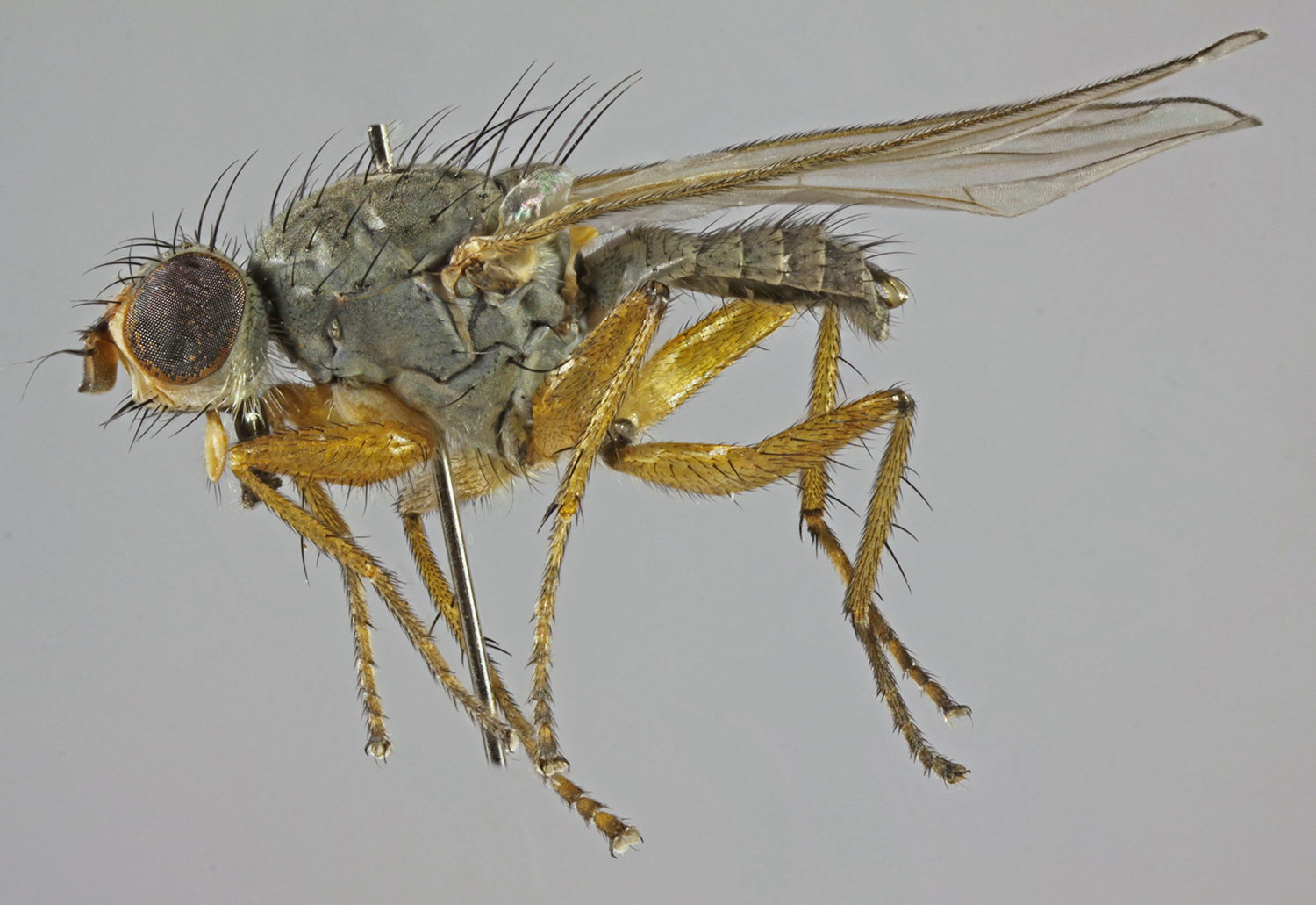
- Chaetosa punctipes North Wales

Scientific classification
- Domain: Eukaryota
- Kingdom: Animalia
- Phylum: Arthropoda
- Class: Insecta
- Order: Diptera
- Family: Scathophagidae
- Genus: Chaetosa
- Species: C. punctipes

Binomial name
- Chaetosa punctipes (Meigen, 1826)

Synonyms
- Cordylura punctipes Meigen, 1826

= Chaetosa punctipes =

Species of fly

Chaetosa punctipes is a species of fly in the family Scathophagidae. It is found in the Palearctic.
