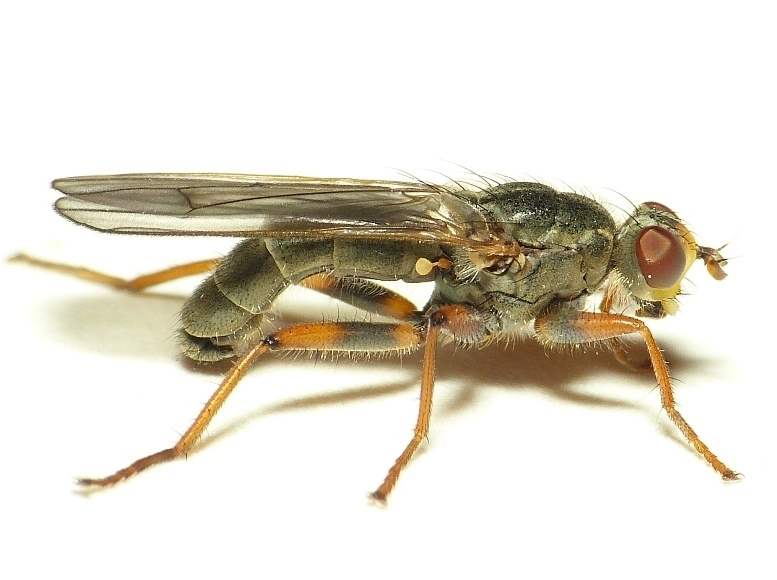
- S. hydromyzina

Scientific classification
- Domain: Eukaryota
- Kingdom: Animalia
- Phylum: Arthropoda
- Class: Insecta
- Order: Diptera
- Family: Scathophagidae
- Subfamily: Scathophaginae
- Genus: Spaziphora; Rondani, 1856

Type species
- Cordylura hydromyzina Fallén, 1819

= Spaziphora =

Genus of flies

The genus Spaziphora are small to medium-sized predatory flies.

== Species ==
- S. cincta (Loew, 1863)
- S. hydromyzina (Fallén, 1819)
- S. tomkovichi Ozerov, 2012
