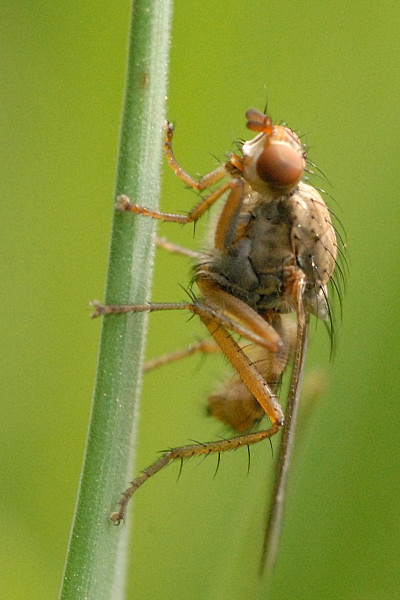
- Nanna articulata

Scientific classification
- Kingdom: Animalia
- Phylum: Arthropoda
- Clade: Pancrustacea
- Class: Insecta
- Order: Diptera
- Family: Scathophagidae
- Subfamily: Scathophaginae
- Tribe: Scathophagini
- Genus: Nanna; Strobl, 1894

Type species
- Cordylura flavipes Fallén, 1819

Synonyms
- Amaurosoma Becker, 1894; Pselaphephila Becker, 1894

= Nanna (fly) =

Genus of flies

Nanna is a genus of small to medium-sized predatory flies.

== Species ==
- N. amurensis Ozerov, 2010
- N. armillata (Zetterstedt, 1846)
- N. articulata (Becker, 1894)
- N. atripes (Malloch, 1931)
- N. bispinosa (Malloch, 1920)
- N. brevifrons (Zetterstedt, 1838)
- N. brunneicosta (Johnson, 1927)
- N. carbonarium (Hendel, 1930)
- N. fasciata (Meigen, 1826)
- N. flavipes (Fallén, 1819)
- N. indotatum Engelmark, 1999
- N. inermis (Becker, 1894)
- N. kamtschatkense (Hendel, 1930)
- N. katmaiensis (Malloch, 1920)
- N. leucochaetum (Meijere, 1907)
- N. leucostoma (Zetterstedt, 1846)
- N. loewi (Becker, 1894)
- N. longicornis (Roser, 1840)
- N. mensurata (Becker, 1894)
- N. multisetosa (Hackman, 1956)
- N. nigrifrontata (Becker, 1894)
- N. nigriventris (Loew, 1864)
- N. nutans (Becker, 1894)
- N. pallidipes (Malloch, 1922)
- N. puberula (Becker, 1894)
- N. rossolimoae Ozerov, 2010
- N. similis (Coquillett, 1902)
- N. tibiella (Zetterstedt, 1838)
- N. truncata Fan, 1976
- N. unispinosa (Malloch, 1920)
