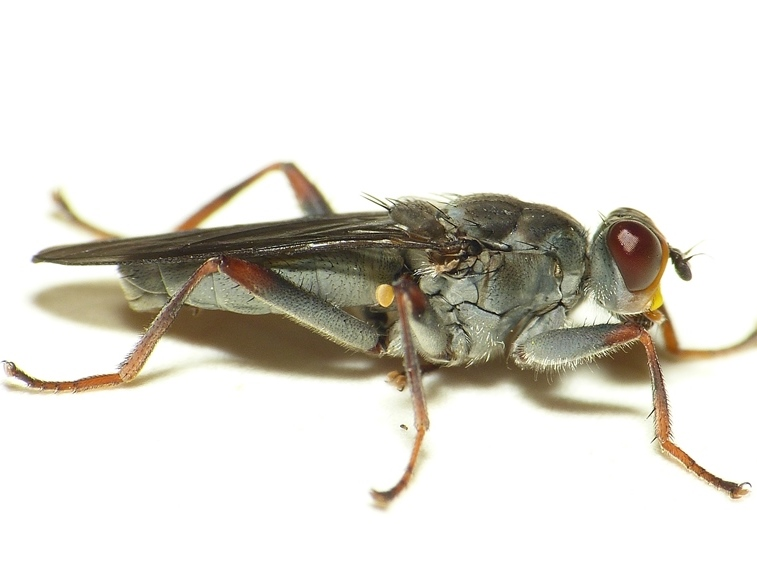
- Hydromyza livens

Scientific classification
- Domain: Eukaryota
- Kingdom: Animalia
- Phylum: Arthropoda
- Class: Insecta
- Order: Diptera
- Family: Scathophagidae
- Subfamily: Scathophaginae
- Genus: Hydromyza; Fallen, 1813

= Hydromyza =

Genus of flies

Hydromyza is a genus of dung flies in the family Scathophagidae. There are at least three described species within the genus Hydromyza.

== Species ==
These three species belong to the genus Hydromyza:

- Hydromyza confluens Loew, 1863
- Hydromyza glabra (Walker, 1849)
- Hydromyza livens (Fabricius, 1794)
