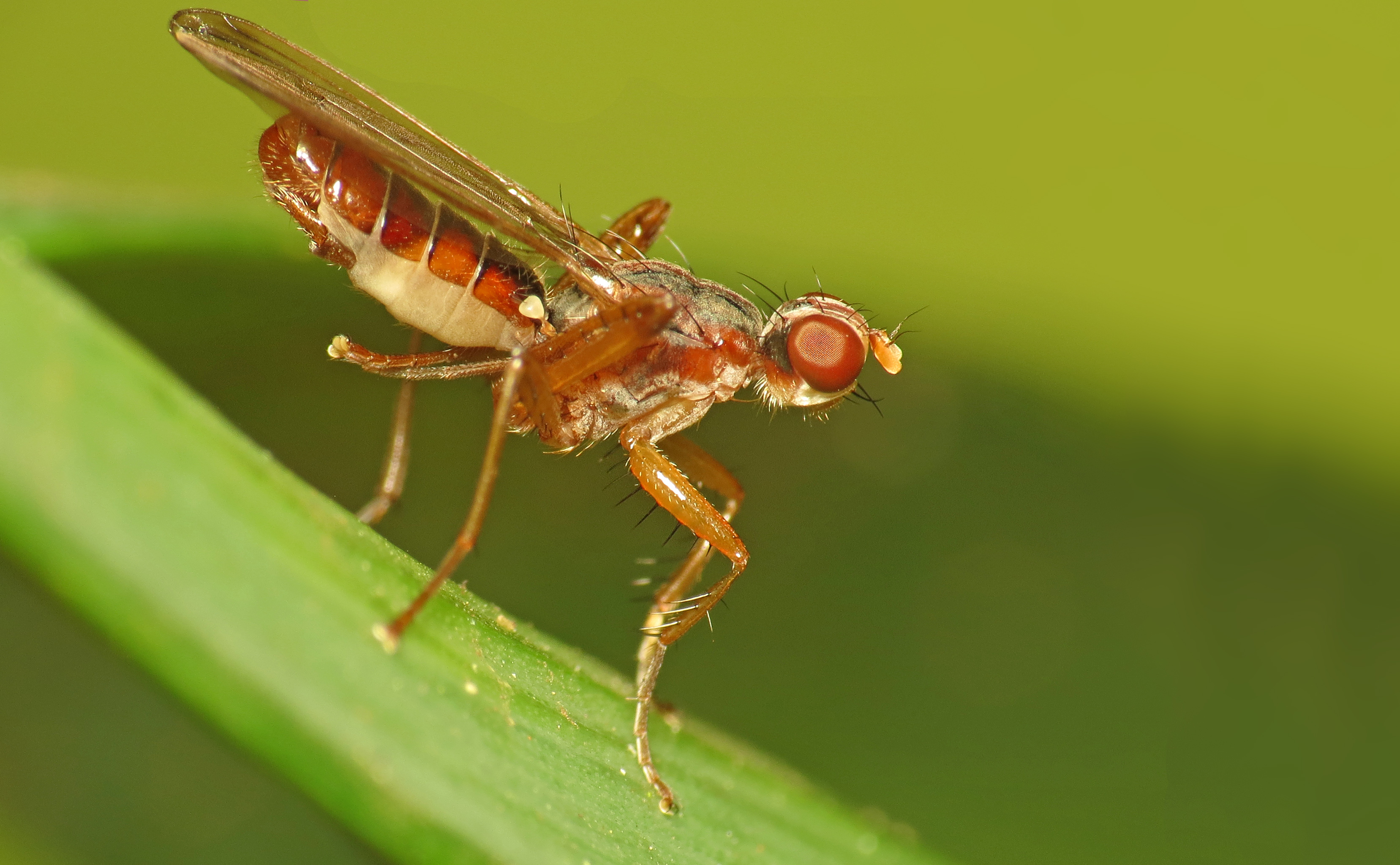
- Norellia spinipes

Scientific classification
- Kingdom: Animalia
- Phylum: Arthropoda
- Class: Insecta
- Order: Diptera
- Family: Scathophagidae
- Subfamily: Scathophaginae
- Genus: Norellia; Robineau-Desvoidy, 1830

Type species
- Norellia pseudonarcissi Robineau-Desvoidy, 1830

Synonyms
- Acantholena Rondani, 1856; Achantholena Rondani, 1856

= Norellia =

Genus of flies

Norellia is a genus of small to medium sized predatory flies. Most of the species formally placed in this genus are now in the genus Norellisoma.

== Selected species ==
- Norellia spinipes (Meigen, 1826) daffodil fly
