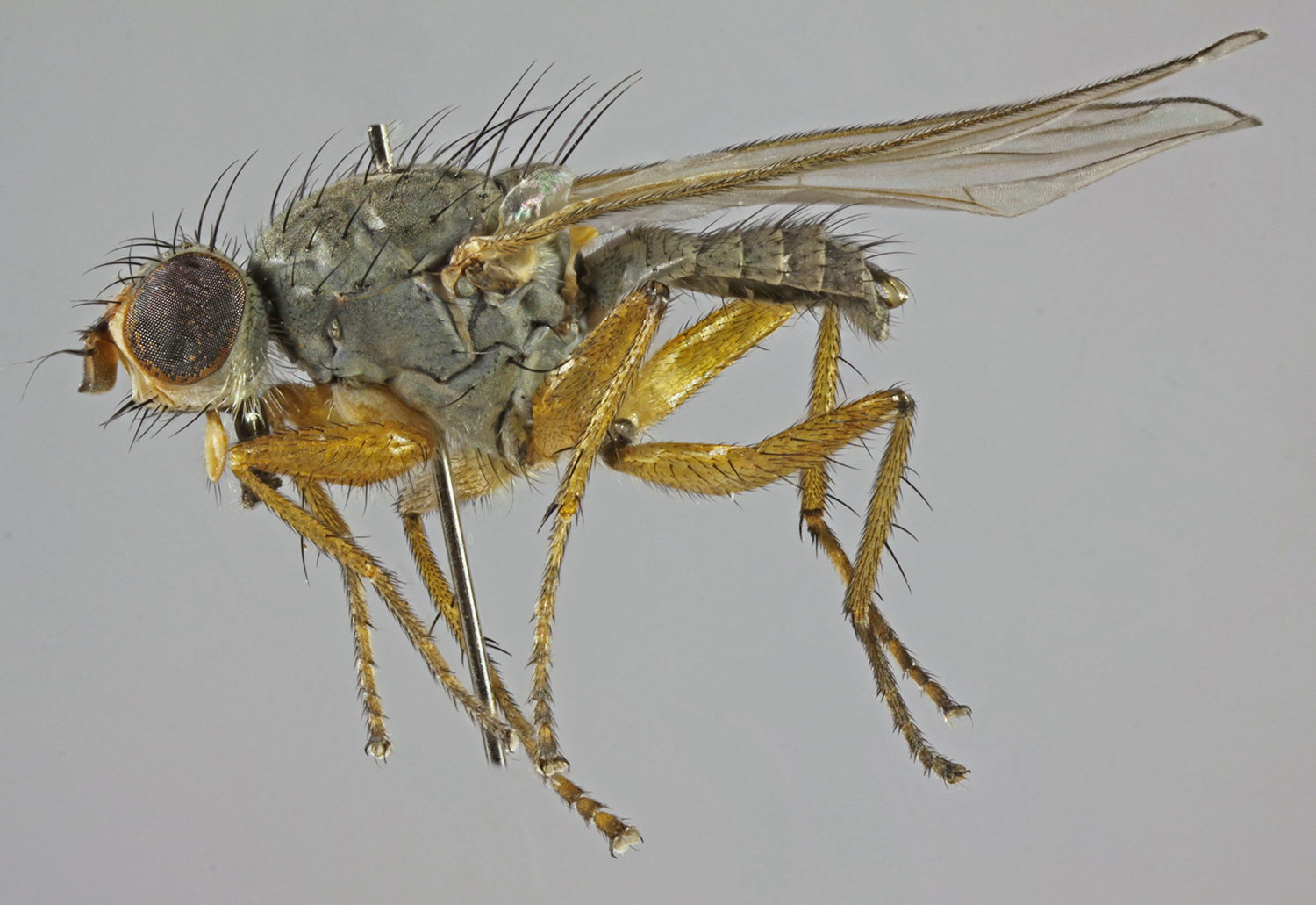
- Chaetosa punctipes

Scientific classification
- Kingdom: Animalia
- Phylum: Arthropoda
- Class: Insecta
- Order: Diptera
- Family: Scathophagidae
- Subfamily: Scathophaginae
- Genus: Chaetosa; Coquillett, 1898

Type species
- Cordylura punctipes Meigen, 1826

= Chaetosa =

Genus of flies

Chaetosa is a genus of small to medium-sized predatory flies.

== Species ==
- Chaetosa churchilli Malloch, 1931
- Chaetosa punctipes (Meigen, 1826)
