= Scutelliseta =

Scientific classification
- Kingdom: Animalia
- Phylum: Arthropoda
- Class: Insecta
- Order: Diptera
- Family: Sphaeroceridae
- Subfamily: Limosininae
- Genus: Scutelliseta; Richards, 1960

Type species
- Scutelliseta coriacea Richards, 1960

Genus of flies

Scutelliseta is a genus of flies belonging to the family Sphaeroceridae, the lesser dung flies.

== Species ==
- S. albicoxa Richards, 1968
- S. bicolorina Richards, 1968
- S. brunneonigra Richards, 1968
- S. caledoniana Richards, 1968
- S. coriacea Richards, 1960
- S. leonina Richards, 1968
- S. lepidogaster Richards, 1968
- S. luteifrons Richards, 1968
- S. megalogaster Richards, 1968
- S. mesaptiloides Richards, 1968
- S. microptera Richards, 1968
- S. mischogaster Norrbom & Kim, 1985
- S. nigrocaerulea Richards, 1968
- S. orbitalis Richards, 1968
- S. peregrina Richards, 1968
- S. procoxalis Richards, 1968
- S. swaziana Richards, 1968
- S. xanthothorax Richards, 1968
