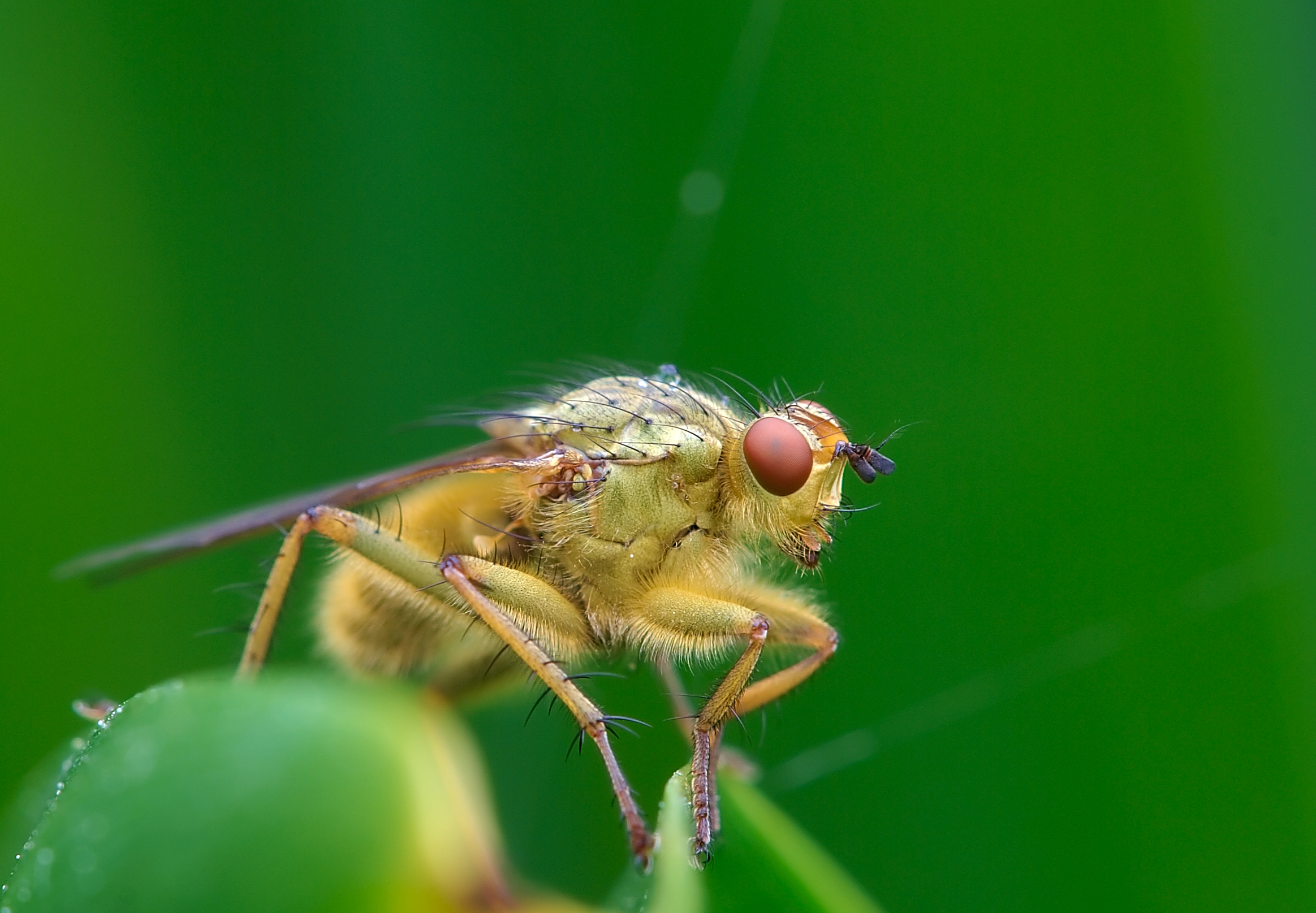

Scientific classification
- Kingdom: Animalia
- Phylum: Arthropoda
- Clade: Pancrustacea
- Class: Insecta
- Order: Diptera
- Family: Scathophagidae
- Genus: Scathophaga
- Species: S. stercoraria

Binomial name
- Scathophaga stercoraria (Linnaeus, 1758)

Synonyms
- Musca merdaria Fabricius, 1794; Musca stercoraria Linnaeus, 1758; Musca exilis Harris, 1780

= Scathophaga stercoraria =

Species of fly

Scathophaga stercoraria, commonly known as the yellow dung fly or the golden dung fly, is one of the most familiar and abundant flies in many parts of the Northern Hemisphere. As its common name suggests, it is often found on the feces of large mammals, such as horses, cattle, sheep, deer, and wild boar, where it goes to breed. The distribution of S. stercoraria is likely influenced by human agriculture, especially in northern Europe and North America. The Scathophaga are integral in the animal kingdom due to their role in the natural decomposition of dung in fields. They are also very important in the scientific world due to their short life cycles and susceptibility to experimental manipulations; thus, they have contributed significant knowledge about animal behavior.

== Description ==
Scathophaga stercoraria is sexually dimorphic, with an average lifespan of one to two months. The adult males are bright golden-yellow with orange-yellow fur on the front legs. Females are a little duller in color, with pronounced green-brown tinges, and no brightly colored fur on the front legs. The adults range from 5 to 11 mm in length, and the males are generally larger than the females. The physical features of separate S. stercoraria populations can vary greatly, due in part to the range of locations in which the species is found. Generally, they are located in cooler temperate regions, including North America, Asia, and Europe. They may also favor higher altitudes, such as the Pyrenees and Swiss Alps.

== Feeding ==
Scathophaga stercoraria, hunting and eating

The adults mainly prey on smaller insects, mostly other Diptera. They can also consume nectar and dung as additional sources of energy. In a laboratory setting, adult S. stercoraria can live solely on Drosophila and water. Females spend most of their time foraging in vegetation and only visit dung pats to mate and oviposit on the dung surface. Both males and females are attracted to dung by scent, and approach dung pats against the wind. Males spend most of their time on the dung, waiting for females and feeding on other insects that visit the dung, such as blow flies. In the absence of other prey, the yellow dung fly may turn to cannibalism. The larvae are coprophagous, relying on dung for nutrition.

== Reproduction ==
Scathophaga stercoraria breeds on the dung of many large mammals, but generally prefers fresh cattle dung. The operational sex ratio on these pats is very male-biased and competition is high. Females are small and have limited precopulatory choice. Copulation lasts 20–50 minutes, after which the male attempts to guard the female from other males. Both males and females often mate with multiple partners. Reproductive success depends on a variety of factors, including sperm competition, nutrition, and environmental temperature.

=== Anatomy ===
Females have paired accessory glands, which supply lubricants to the reproductive system and secrete protein-rich egg shells. Sperm is received in a large structure called the bursa copulatrix, and is stored in a structure called the spermatheca. Scathophaga species have three spermathecae, (one pair and one singlet), each with its own narrow duct that connects it to the bursa. Sperm can be stored in the spermathecae for days, weeks, or even years, and sperm from several males can be stored simultaneously. Males have two projections, the paralobes, which are used to hold onto a female during copulation. Between the paralobes is the intromittent organ, the aedeagus, which transfers sperm into the female's bursa copulatrix.

=== Behavior ===
During copulation, sperm is not directly deposited into sperm-storing organs. Ejaculation occurs in the bursa copulatrix, and then females actively move sperm into the spermathecae using their muscular spermathecal invagination to pump sperm into transit. This gives females a level of control over which and how much sperm enters her system, an example of cryptic female choice. Although current results are inconclusive regarding whether or not females are cryptically selecting for a better phenotypic match, a female may benefit from having variable sperm fertilizing her offspring. Such adaptations are advantageous because females benefit from being able to control which sperm are successful in fertilizing eggs. The females may not be aware of which sperm are better suited for her offspring, but simply that being able to control the proportion of sperm from multiple mates can maximize the possibility of an optimal phenotypic match. It is to her advantage to have multiple males' sperm reach her eggs, rather than just one. After copulation, females prefer to lay their eggs on the small hills of the dung surface, avoiding depressions and pointed areas. This survival strategy aims to prevent desiccation and drowning so the eggs are placed where they have the greatest chance of surviving.

=== Sexual conflict ===
Many studies have studied the many manifestations of sexual conflict, including post-mating sexual selection, in the yellow dung fly. Sperm competition occurs when a female mates with multiple males. Each male's sperm is then in direct competition to fertilize the eggs. Sperm mix quickly once they reach the female's stores. The goal of males is to displace the sperm of other males as much as possible. Larger males tend to have longer copulation times and greater rates of sperm displacement. The fertilization success of males that were secondary mates increased as their body size relative to the first male increased.

Traits such as body size, testis size, and sperm length are variable, as well as heritable in S. stercoraria males. Larger sperm may be advantageous if they have greater propulsion along the female's spermathecal duct, resulting in higher fertilization success rates. When competition among males is high and females are mating with multiple males, those with the largest testes also have the most success in terms of proportion of sperm that fertilize a female's eggs. The resulting male offspring would then have a similar advantage.

A positive correlation was found between sperm length of males and spermathecal duct length of females. The size of male testis was also positively correlated with female spermathecae size. Additionally, females with larger spermathecae are better able to produce spermicidal secretion. This cryptic female choice betters their ability to influence paternity over their offspring. These covariances are an example of an "evolutionary arms race". This suggests that each sex evolves certain traits to undermine the beneficial traits of the other, resulting in the coevolution of male and female reproductive systems of S. stercoraria.

== Life cycle ==
The eggs that the female lays on the dung hatch into larvae after 1–2 days, depending on temperature. The larvae quickly burrow into the dung for protection and feed on it. At 20 °C, larvae undergo three molts over five days, during which they grow exponentially. After growth, larvae spend another five days emptying their stomachs before pupation, where no additional body mass is gained. After 10–20 days, the larvae burrow into the soil around and beneath the dung and pupate. The time needed for the juvenile flies to emerge can vary from 10 days at 25 °C to 80 days at 10 °C or less. The smaller females typically emerge a few days before the males. The fitness of the resulting juveniles is greatly dependent on the quality of the dung in which they were placed. Factors affecting dung quality include water content, nutritional quality, parasites, and drugs or other chemicals given to the animal.

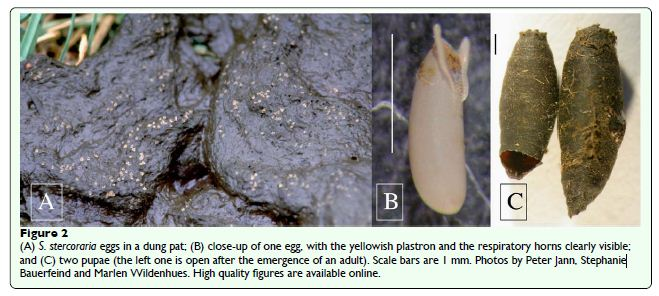
Life stages of S. stercoraria

Yellow dung flies are anautogenous. To become sexually mature and produce viable eggs or sperm, they must feed on prey to acquire sufficient proteins and lipids. Females under nutritional stress will have higher rates of egg mortality and less survival of offspring to adult emergence. S. stercoraria females can then produce 4 to 10 clutches in their lifetimes. The adults are active throughout much of the year in most moderate climates.

== Phenology ==
Yellow dung fly viability depends strongly on the environment. In warmer climates, a sharp population decline often occurs in the summer, when the temperatures increase above 25 °C. Meanwhile, no population decline is seen in colder climates, such as Iceland, Finland, and northern England, and high elevations. Additionally, the number of generations per year varies with altitude and latitude, typically between two and four overlapping generations. The end of winter synchronizes the first emergence in March, and the overwinter generations are produced in the fall. In northern Europe, where the mating season is shorter, only one or two generations can be expected.

== Phenotypic plasticity ==
Yellow dung flies have extremely variable phenotypes – body size and development rate in particular. Proximate causes of variation include juvenile nutrition, temperature, predation, and genetic variation. Much phenotypic plasticity in yellow dung flies is a result of food (dung) availability in the larval stage, which is often mediated by conspecific competition. Less dung results in more competitors, and more drying results in decreased growth rate and adult body size. Additionally, when exposed to constant temperatures in a laboratory setting, higher temperatures during growth yield smaller flies. Egg volume, but not clutch size, also decreases with increasing temperature. Giving merit to the hypothesis that constraints on physiological processes at the cellular level account for temperature-mediated body size, studies have also shown that S. stercoraria body size varies via gene-by-environment interactions. Different cell lines vary significantly in growth, development, and adult body size in response to food limitation.

=== Geographic variation ===
Scathophaga stercoraria's phenotype has been shown to vary seasonally, latitudinally, and altitudinally as a result of an adaptive response to time constraints on development due to temperature changes. In the fall, as the temperature cools, the flies are able to increase development rate, so they can achieve the necessary, albeit smaller than average, size. Furthermore, S. stercoraria development rate increases with increasing latitude. This is likely an adaptive response to shorter mating seasons. Body size, but not development rate, vary with altitude. Dung flies are larger at higher altitudes as a result of colder temperatures.

=== Reasons behind phenotypic plasticity ===
Larger yellow dung flies have a competitive advantage. Therefore, body size plasticity must be a survival mechanism. Offspring of large adults still survive under food limitations, despite needing more nutrients for a longer development. Thus, the observed growth plasticity is a result of altering body chemistry and not differing survival rates of offspring from small and large parents. Plastic development rate and body size are effective at avoiding premature death, meaning S. stercoraria adopts a strategy of being small and alive over large and dead. Smaller flies have an advantage in stressful environmental situations, due to larger dung flies needing more energy. Additionally, low genetic differentiation exists between yellow dung fly populations, likely due to extensive gene flow, as S. stercoraria is able to travel great distances. When species are unable to adapt through genetics, phenotypic plasticity is the most viable option to adjust to changing environments. Yellow dung flies develop in extremely variable environments, with pat drying, dung availability, and larval competition hindering survival. Therefore, phenotypic plasticity allows S. stercoraria to adjust development according to unpredictable ecological situations without genetic adaptation.

== Parasites and diseases ==
Since S. stercoraria is a synanthropic fly, it does carry the risk of passively contaminating human food with various pathogens, molds, or yeasts.

Some sexually transmitted diseases of insects are known, particularly in Coleoptera. Similar diseases have also been studied in S. stercoraria. Many of these sexually transmitted diseases are from multicellular ectoparasites (mites), protists, or the fungus Entomophthora muscae. These are frequently responsible for either sterilizing or killing the host fly.

== Predators ==
As well as being an easy meal for a great many bird and bat species, these flies are also preyed upon by other insects. Much competition exists between larvae of different species within a dung pat. Other insect species may also use the pats as hunting grounds. These include robber flies and clown beetles.

== Use as a model organism ==
Like Drosophila melanogaster, the yellow dung fly is an ideal model organism due to its short lifespan and susceptibility to various experimental manipulations. Initial interest in yellow dung flies came from their potential as biocontrol agents against pest flies around livestock. In the past 40 years alone, many studies have used S. stercoraria to research topics such as sperm competition, mating behavior, sexual conflict, reproductive physiology, thermal biology, and genetics. In particular, research on yellow dung flies has contributed greatly to understanding of multiple mating systems and sperm competition.

Recently, S. stercoraria was approved as a standard required test species for ecotoxicological testing. This includes evaluating the residues of veterinary drugs in livestock dung. Yellow dung flies are a key part of decomposing waste in pastures, which is key to preventing the spread of endoparasites and returning nutrients to the soil. The species’ diet also serves to reduce the abundance of pest flies. To test a chemical's toxicity, the chemical is mixed with bovine faeces, to which yellow dung fly eggs are added. Then, endpoints, such as sex and number of emerged adult flies, retardation of emergence, morphological change, and developmental rate, are measured and analyzed to determine toxicity. A great deal of research has been done on the effects of avermectins on populations of S. stercoraria. Avermectins are used to control endoparasites in livestock. The resulting dung contains drug residues that can have unintentional adverse effects on yellow dung fly populations, such as increased mutations and decreased offspring viability. If the use of such drugs in agriculture is not carefully monitored, considerable economic losses could occur.
