= Parallelomma =

Scientific classification
- Domain: Eukaryota
- Kingdom: Animalia
- Phylum: Arthropoda
- Class: Insecta
- Order: Diptera
- Family: Scathophagidae
- Subfamily: Delininae
- Genus: Parallelomma; Becker, 1894

Genus of flies

Parallelomma is a genus of dung flies in the family Scathophagidae. There are about five described species in Parallelomma, found mainly in North America and Europe.

== Species ==
These species belong to the genus Parallelomma:

- Parallelomma flava (Szilady, 1943)
- Parallelomma media Becker, 1894
- Parallelomma merzi Ozerov, 2008
- Parallelomma paradis Hering, 1923
- Parallelomma vittatum (Meigen, 1826)
