= Neochirosia =

Scientific classification
- Kingdom: Animalia
- Phylum: Arthropoda
- Clade: Pancrustacea
- Class: Insecta
- Order: Diptera
- Family: Scathophagidae
- Subfamily: Delininae
- Genus: Neochirosia; Malloch, 1917

Genus of flies

Neochirosia is a genus of dung flies in the family Scathophagidae. There are at least three described species in Neochirosia.

== Species ==
These three species belong to the genus Neochirosia:

- Neochirosia atrifrons (Coquillett, 1910)^{i c g}
- Neochirosia nuda (Malloch, 1922)^{i c g b}
- Neochirosia nikita
- Neochirosia setiger Malloch, 1917^{i c g}

Data sources: i = ITIS, c = Catalogue of Life, g = GBIF, b = Bugguide.net
