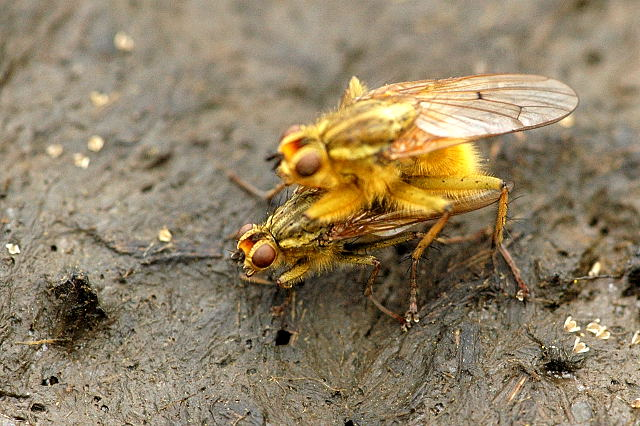
- Scathophaga stercoraria, the yellow dung fly

Scientific classification
- Domain: Eukaryota
- Kingdom: Animalia
- Phylum: Arthropoda
- Class: Insecta
- Order: Diptera
- Family: Scathophagidae
- Subfamily: Scathophaginae
- Genus: Scathophaga; Meigen, 1803

Type species
- Musca merdaria Fabricius, 1794

Synonyms
- Pyropa Illiger, 1807; Scatina Robineau-Desvoidy, 1830; Scatomyza Fallén, 1810; Scatophaga Fabricius, 1805; Scopeuma Meigen, 1800

= Scathophaga =

Genus of flies

S. furcata in copula

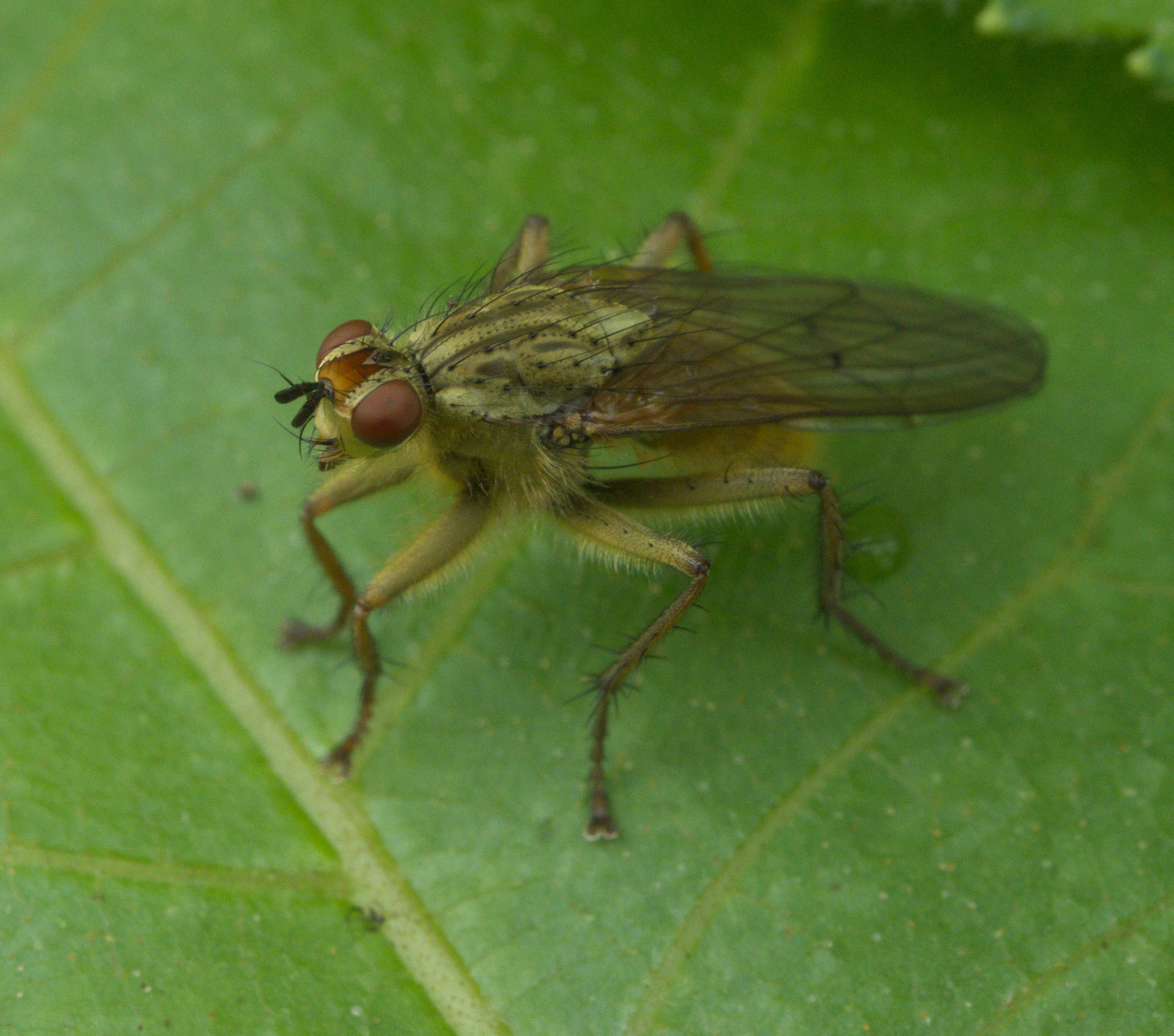

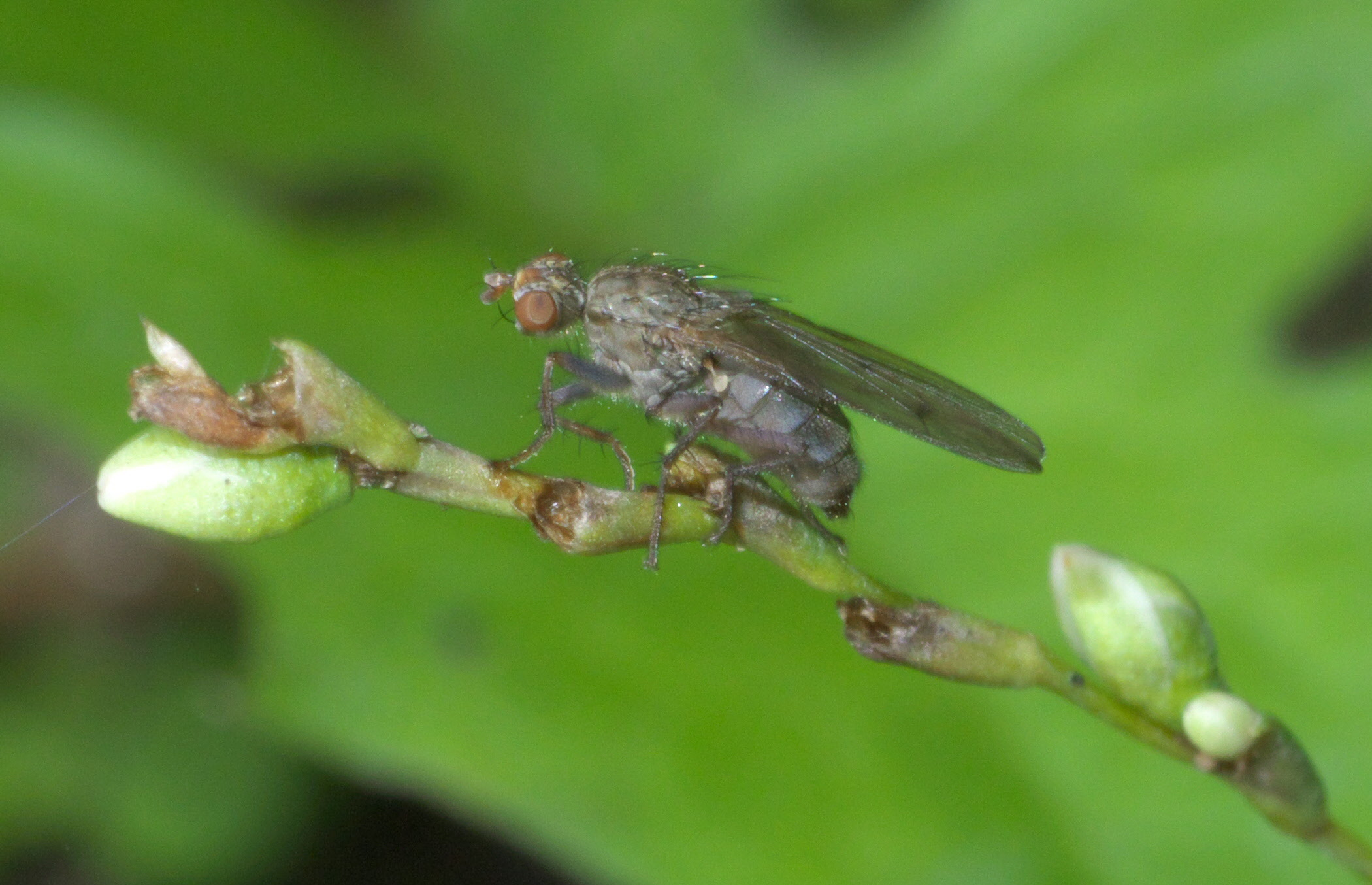

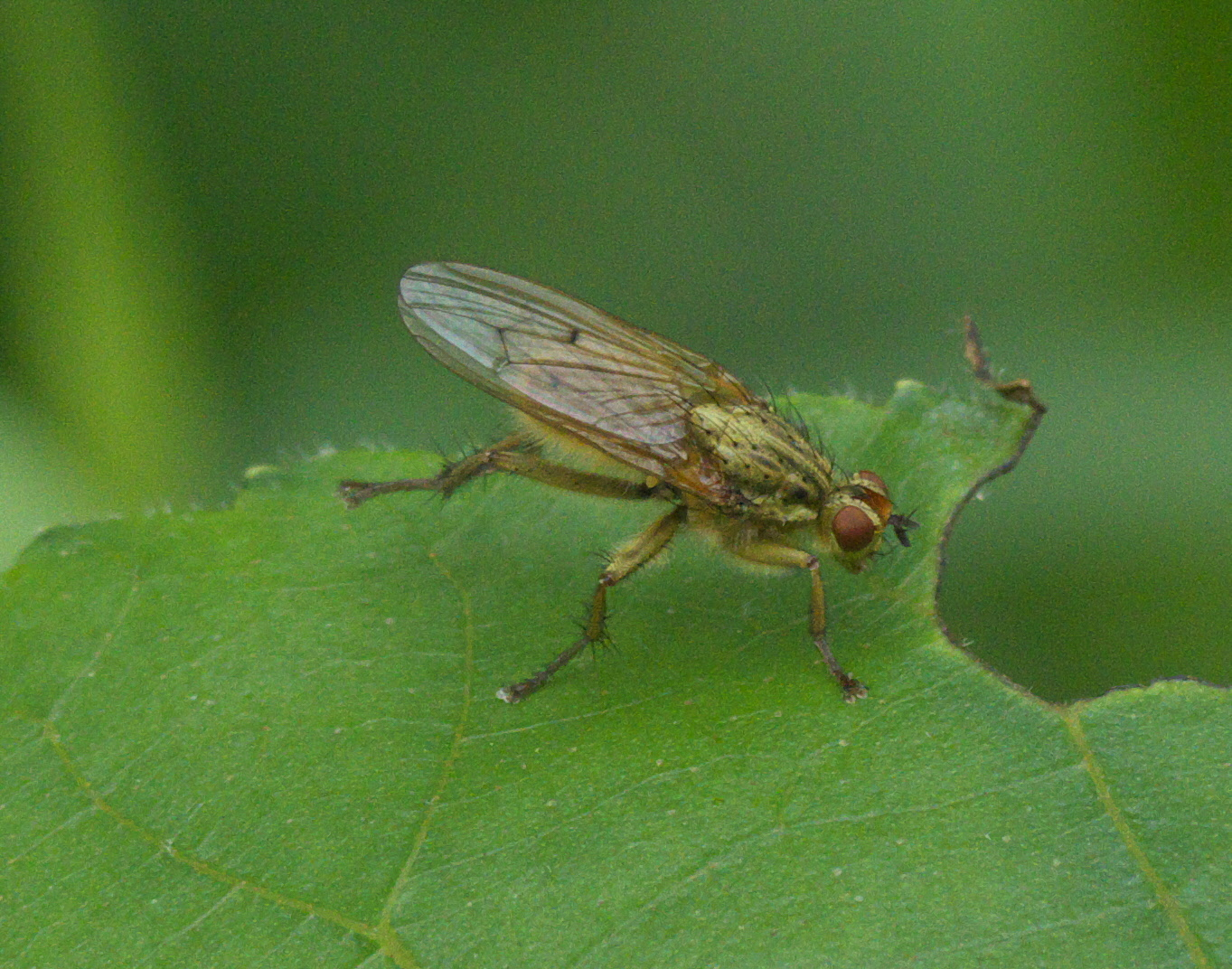

The genus Scathophaga are small to medium sized predatory flies that for the most part, have larvae that feed on other insect larva within animal dung or decaying vegetable matter. Many are highly variable, sometimes producing small, infertile males that superficially resemble females. This species is an example of an organism which may selectively store the sperm of multiple males, as females have three to four spermathecae.

== Species ==
These 99 species belong to the genus Scathophaga:

- Scathophaga alashanica
- Scathophaga alata (Becker, 1914)^{c g}
- Scathophaga albidohirta (Becker, 1907)^{c g}
- Scathophaga albipes (Fabricius, 1805)^{g}
- Scathophaga aldrichi (Malloch, 1920)^{i c g}
- Scathophaga amplipennis (Portschinsky, 1887)^{c g}
- Scathophaga analis (Meigen, 1826)^{c g}
- Scathophaga apicalis (Curtis, 1835)^{i c g}
- Scathophaga arrogans (Haliday, 1832)^{c g}
- Scathophaga bicolor (Collart, 1942)^{c g}
- Scathophaga bipunctata (Macquart, 1835)^{c g}
- Scathophaga bohemiae Sifner, 2000^{c g}
- Scathophaga buryatica
- Scathophaga calceata Ozerov, 2008^{c g}
- Scathophaga calida (Haliday, 1832)^{c g}
- Scathophaga cineraria (Meigen, 1826)^{c g}
- Scathophaga claripennis (Robineau-Desvoidy, 1830)^{c g}
- Scathophaga cordylurina (Holmgren, 1883)^{c g}
- Scathophaga crinita (Coquillett, 1901)^{i c g b}
- Scathophaga curtipilata Feng, 2002^{c g}
- Scathophaga dalmatica (Becker, 1894)^{c g}
- Scathophaga dasythrix (Becker, 1894)^{i c g}
- Scathophaga decipiens (Haliday, 1832)^{c g}
- Scathophaga eoa Ozerov, 2007^{c g}
- Scathophaga erythrostoma (Holmgren, 1883)^{c g}
- Scathophaga estotilandica (Rondani, 1863)^{c g}
- Scathophaga exalata Ozerov, 1997^{c g}
- Scathophaga eximia (Haliday, 1832)^{c g}
- Scathophaga exotica (Wiedemann, 1830)^{c g}
- Scathophaga flavihirta Sun, 1998^{c g}
- Scathophaga fluvialis (Rondani, 1867)^{c g}
- Scathophaga foetulecta (Seguy, 1966)^{c g}
- Scathophaga fontinalis (Rondani, 1867)^{c g}
- Scathophaga frigida (Coquillett, 1900)^{i c g}
- Scathophaga furcata (Say, 1823)^{i c g b}
- Scathophaga gigantea (Aldrich, 1932)^{c g}
- Scathophaga grisea (Malloch, 1920)^{i c g}
- Scathophaga guerini (Robineau-Desvoidy, 1830)^{c g}
- Scathophaga hiemalis (James, 1950)^{i c g}
- Scathophaga humilis (Robineau-Desvoidy, 1830)^{c g}
- Scathophaga incola (Becker, 1900)^{i c g}
- Scathophaga infumatum (Becker, 1907)^{c g}
- Scathophaga inquinata (Meigen, 1826)^{c g}
- Scathophaga intermedia (Walker, 1849)^{i c g b}
- Scathophaga islandica (Becker, 1894)^{i c g}
- Scathophaga janmayeni (Séguy, 1938)^{g}
- Scathophaga jezeki (Sifner, 1981)^{c g}
- Scathophaga jizerensis Sifner, 2004^{c g}
- Scathophaga kaszabi Sifner, 1975^{c g}
- Scathophaga lapponica (Ringdahl, 1920)^{i c g}
- Scathophaga lateralis (Meigen, 1826)^{c g}
- Scathophaga limbata (Roser, 1840)^{c g}
- Scathophaga litorea (Fallen, 1819)^{i c g}
- Scathophaga lutaria (Fabricius, 1794)^{c g}
- Scathophaga magnipennis (Portschinsky, 1887)^{c g}
- Scathophaga mellipes Coquillett, 1898^{g}
- Scathophaga mihalyii Sifner, 1975^{c g}
- Scathophaga milani Sifner, 1981^{c g}
- Scathophaga moceki Sifner, 2004^{c g}
- Scathophaga mollis (Becker, 1894)^{i c g}
- Scathophaga monticola (Malloch, 1924)^{i c g}
- Scathophaga multisetosa (Holmgren, 1883)^{i c g}
- Scathophaga nelsoni Sifner, 2003^{c g}
- Scathophaga nemorosa (Robineau-Desvoidy, 1830)^{c g}
- Scathophaga nigricans (Macquart, 1835)^{c g}
- Scathophaga nigricornis (Robineau-Desvoidy, 1830)^{c g}
- Scathophaga nigripalpis (Becker, 1907)^{i c g}
- Scathophaga nigrohirta (Czerny, 1909)^{c g}
- Scathophaga nigrolimbata (Cresson, 1918)^{i c g b}
- Scathophaga obscura (Fallen, 1819)^{i c g}
- Scathophaga obscurinervis (Becker, 1900)^{i c g}
- Scathophaga ochrocephala (Brulle, 1833)^{c g}
- Scathophaga odontosternita Feng, 1999^{c g}
- Scathophaga orcasae (Malloch, 1935)^{i c g}
- Scathophaga pallipes (Szilady, 1926)^{c g}
- Scathophaga parisiensis (Robineau-Desvoidy, 1830)^{c g}
- Scathophaga parviceps (Ringdahl, 1936)^{c g}
- Scathophaga pictipennis (Oldenberg, 1923)^{i c g}
- Scathophaga pubescens (Szilady, 1926)^{c g}
- Scathophaga reses (Giglio-tos, 1893)^{i c g b}
- Scathophaga robusta (Curran, 1927)^{i c g}
- Scathophaga scropharia (Fabricius, 1805)^{c g}
- Scathophaga scybalaria (Linnaeus, 1758)^{c g}
- Scathophaga semiatra (Meijere, 1907)^{c g}
- Scathophaga sinensis Sun, 1998^{c g}
- Scathophaga socia (Becker, 1914)^{c g}
- Scathophaga soror Wiedemann, 1818^{c g}
- Scathophaga staryi Sifner, 2000^{c g}
- Scathophaga stercoraria (Linnaeus, 1758)^{i c g b} (yellow dung fly)
- Scathophaga striatipes (Becker, 1894)^{c g}
- Scathophaga subpolita Malloch, 1935^{i c g}
- Scathophaga suilla (Fabricius, 1794)^{i c g b}
- Scathophaga tessellata (Macquart, 1838)^{c g}
- Scathophaga thoracica (Robineau-Desvoidy, 1830)^{c g}
- Scathophaga tinctinervis (Becker, 1894)^{c g}
- Scathophaga tropicalis (Malloch, 1931)^{c g}
- Scathophaga umbrarum (Robineau-Desvoidy, 1830)^{c g}
- Scathophaga varipes (Holmgren, 1883)^{i c g}
- Scathophaga villosiventre (Ringdahl, 1937)^{c g}
- Scathophaga vlastae Sifner, 2000^{c g}
- Scathophaga xinjiangensis Sun, 1998^{c g}

Data sources: i = ITIS, c = Catalogue of Life, g = GBIF, b = Bugguide.net
