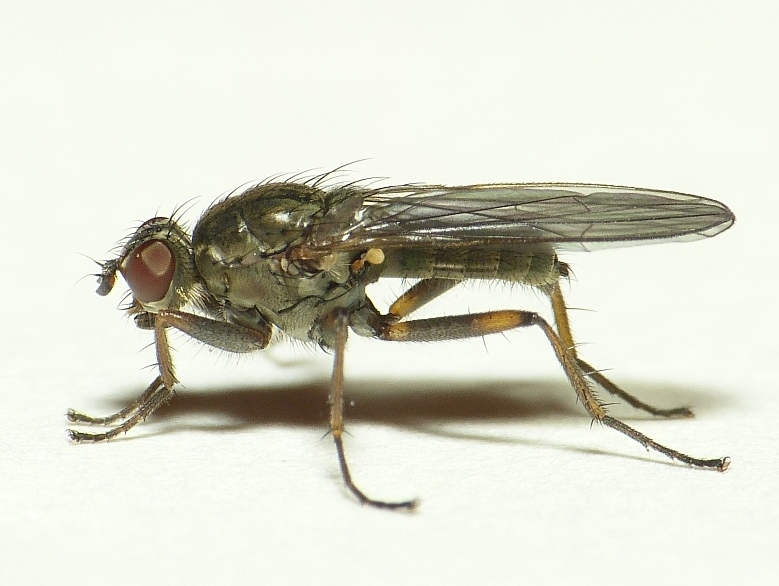
- Trichopalpus fraternus, location: The Netherlands - Wageningen - Plasserwaard

Scientific classification
- Kingdom: Animalia
- Phylum: Arthropoda
- Clade: Pancrustacea
- Class: Insecta
- Order: Diptera
- Family: Scathophagidae
- Subfamily: Scathophaginae
- Genus: Trichopalpus; Rondani, 1856

Type species
- Cordylura fraterna Meigen, 1826

Synonyms
- Opsiomyia Coquillett, 1898; Paramicroposopa Neave, 1950; Paramicroprosopa Ringdahl, 1936; Tricopalpus Becker, 1905

= Trichopalpus =

Genus of flies

The genus Trichopalpus are small to medium-sized predatory flies.

== Species ==
- T. obscurella (Zetterstedt, 1846)
- T. fraternus (Meigen, 1826)
- T. palpalis (Coquillett, 1898)
- T. nigribasis Curran, 1927
