= Pogonota =

Scientific classification
- Kingdom: Animalia
- Phylum: Arthropoda
- Class: Insecta
- Order: Diptera
- Family: Scathophagidae
- Subfamily: Scathophaginae
- Genus: Pogonota; Zetterstedt, 1860

Type species
- Cordylura hircus Zetterstedt, 1838

Synonyms
- Lasioscelus Becker, 1894; Okenina Malloch, 1931

Genus of flies

Pogonota is a genus of small to medium sized predatory flies.

== Species ==
- Pogonota barbata (Zetterstedt, 1838)
- Pogonota gilvipes (Loew, 1863)
- Pogonota immunda (Zetterstedt, 1838)
- Pogonota nigricans (Loew, 1873)
- Pogonota pallida Malloch, 1931
- Pogonota sahlbergi (Becker, 1900)
