= Americina =

Scientific classification
- Domain: Eukaryota
- Kingdom: Animalia
- Phylum: Arthropoda
- Class: Insecta
- Order: Diptera
- Family: Scathophagidae
- Genus: Americina; Malloch, 1923
- Species: A. adusta

Binomial name
- Americina adusta (Loew, 1863)

Genus of flies

Americina is a genus of dung flies in the family Scathophagidae. There is at least one described species in Americina, A. adusta.
