= Allomyella =

Scientific classification
- Domain: Eukaryota
- Kingdom: Animalia
- Phylum: Arthropoda
- Class: Insecta
- Order: Diptera
- Family: Scathophagidae
- Genus: Allomyella; Malloch, 1923

Genus of flies

Allomyella is a genus of flies belonging to the family Scathophagidae.

The species of this genus are found in Europe and North America.

Species:

- Allomyella albipennis (Zetterstedt, 1838)
- Allomyella borealis Curran, 1927
- Allomyella brevipennis Malloch, 1923
- Allomyella crinipes Ringdahl, 1928
- Allomyella frigida (Holmgren, 1883)
- Allomyella portenkoi Stackelberg, 1952
- Allomyella unguiculata Malloch, 1919
