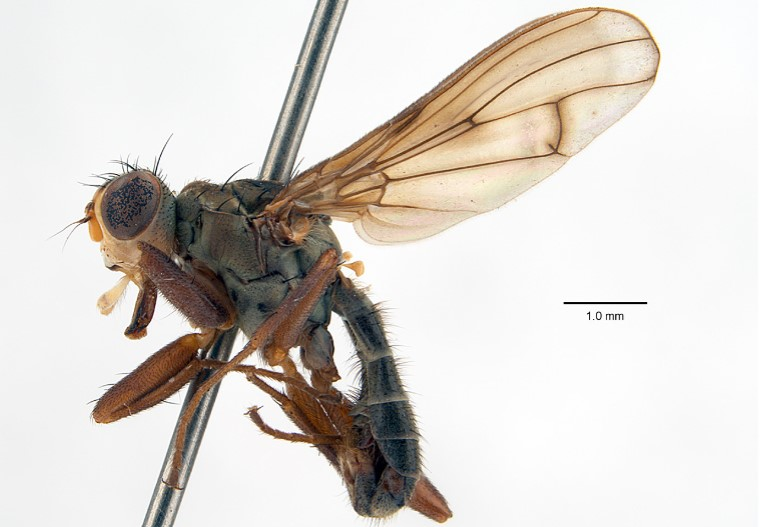

Scientific classification
- Kingdom: Animalia
- Phylum: Arthropoda
- Clade: Pancrustacea
- Class: Insecta
- Order: Diptera
- Family: Scathophagidae
- Genus: Acanthocnema; Becker, 1894

= Acanthocnema =

Genus of flies

Acanthocnema is a genus of flies belonging to the family Scathophagidae.

The species of this genus are found in Europe and Northern America.

Species:

- Acanthocnema albibarba (Loew, 1870)
- Acanthocnema capillata (Loew, 1872)
- Acanthocnema glaucescens (Loew, 1864)
- Acanthocnema himalaica Suwa, 1986
- Acanthocnema longispina Suwa, 1986
- Acanthocnema nigrimana (Zetterstedt, 1846)
- Acanthocnema ruficauda Curran, 1929
- Acanthocnema sternalis Suwa, 1986
