= Leptopa =

Scientific classification
- Kingdom: Animalia
- Phylum: Arthropoda
- Clade: Pancrustacea
- Class: Insecta
- Order: Diptera
- Family: Anthomyiidae
- Genus: Leptopa; Zetterstedt, 1838

Genus of flies

Leptopa is a genus of flies in the family Anthomyiidae.

== Taxonomy ==
Leptopa contains the following species:

- Leptopa media
- Leptopa vittata
- Leptopa filiformis
