= Ceratinostoma =

Scientific classification
- Domain: Eukaryota
- Kingdom: Animalia
- Phylum: Arthropoda
- Class: Insecta
- Order: Diptera
- Family: Scathophagidae
- Genus: Ceratinostoma; Meade, 1885
- Species: C. ostiorum

Binomial name
- Ceratinostoma ostiorum (Curtis, 1832)

Genus of flies

Ceratinostoma is a genus of dung flies in the family Scathophagidae. There is at least one described species in Ceratinostoma, C. ostiorum.
