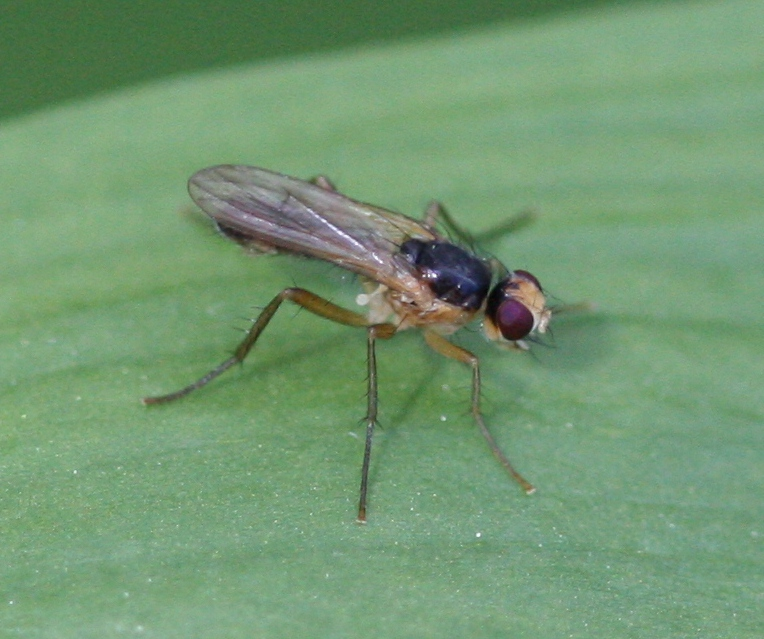

Scientific classification
- Domain: Eukaryota
- Kingdom: Animalia
- Phylum: Arthropoda
- Class: Insecta
- Order: Diptera
- Family: Scathophagidae
- Subfamily: Scathophaginae
- Genus: Cordilura; Fallen, 1810

Synonyms
- Acicephala Coquillett, 1898

= Cordilura =

Genus of insects

Cordilura is a genus of dung flies in the family Scathophagidae. There are more than 90 described species in Cordilura.

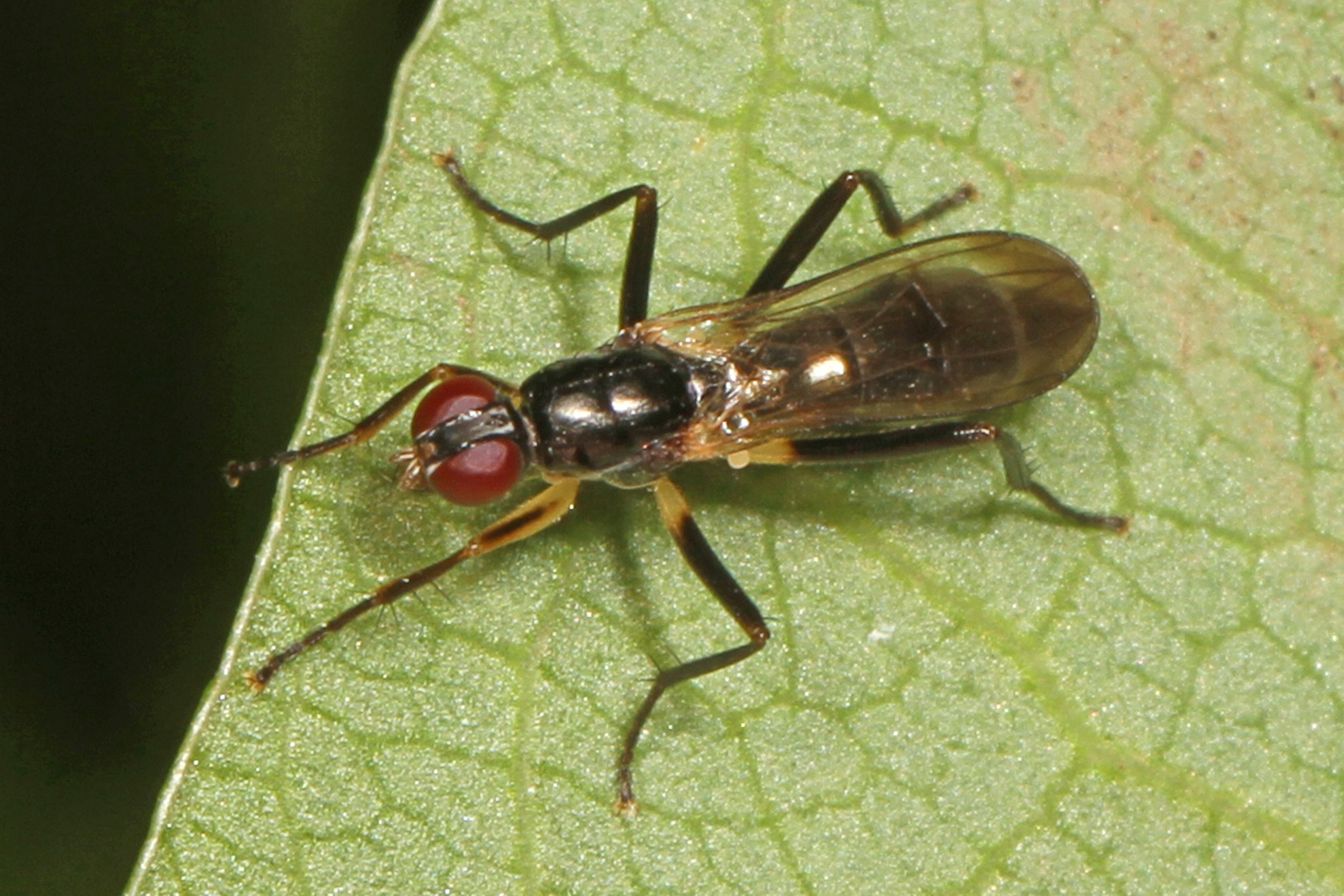

== Species ==
These 97 species belong to the genus Cordilura:

- Cordilura aberrans (Becker, 1894)
- Cordilura adrogans Cresson, 1918
- Cordilura aea (Walker, 1849)
- Cordilura aemula (Collin, 1958)
- Cordilura alberta (Curran, 1927)
- Cordilura albicoxa James, 1955
- Cordilura albipes Fallen, 1819
- Cordilura albofasciata (Gimmerthal, 1846)
- Cordilura amurensis Ozerov, 2007
- Cordilura angustifrons Loew, 1863
- Cordilura aricioides (Zetterstedt, 1855)
- Cordilura atrata Zetterstedt, 1846
- Cordilura atripennis James, 1955
- Cordilura banski (Malloch, 1923)
- Cordilura bezzii (Sack, 1937)
- Cordilura bicoloripes Ozerov, 1997
- Cordilura carbonaria (Walker, 1849)
- Cordilura ciliata (Meigen, 1826)
- Cordilura ciliatipes James, 1955
- Cordilura confusa Loew, 1863
- Cordilura connexa (Robineau-Desvoidy, 1830)
- Cordilura criddlei Curran, 1929
- Cordilura cuspidata Sasakawa, 1986
- Cordilura deceptiva Malloch, 1923
- Cordilura dimidiata (Cresson, 1918)
- Cordilura emarginata (Malloch, 1923)
- Cordilura fasciventris Curran, 1927
- Cordilura femoralis Sun, 1993
- Cordilura filipes (Robineau-Desvoidy, 1830)
- Cordilura flava (Wiedemann, 1830)
- Cordilura flavovenosa (Becker, 1894)
- Cordilura fulva (Robineau-Desvoidy, 1830)
- Cordilura fulvifrons Ozerov, 1997
- Cordilura fulvipes (Meigen, 1838)
- Cordilura fuscipes Zetterstedt, 1838
- Cordilura fuscitibia Rondani, 1867
- Cordilura gagatina Loew, 1869
- Cordilura glabra Loew, 1869
- Cordilura gracilipes Loew, 1869
- Cordilura hyalinipennis (Ringdahl, 1936)
- Cordilura impudica (Rondani, 1867)
- Cordilura incisa (Meigen, 1838)
- Cordilura intermedia (Curran, 1927)
- Cordilura kakaberrans Ozerov, 1997
- Cordilura krocha Ozerov, 2007
- Cordilura laterillii (Robineau-Desvoidy, 1830)
- Cordilura latifrons Loew, 1869
- Cordilura loewi James, 1955
- Cordilura luteola Malloch, 1924
- Cordilura marginata (Malloch, 1931)
- Cordilura marginipennis (Gimmerthal, 1847)
- Cordilura munda Loew, 1869
- Cordilura nartshukae Ozerov & Krivosheina
- Cordilura nigra (Robineau-Desvoidy, 1830)
- Cordilura nigrifrons Sun, 1993
- Cordilura nigripila (Zetterstedt, 1860)
- Cordilura nigriseta (Rondani, 1867)
- Cordilura nubecula Sasakawa, 1986
- Cordilura ontario Curran, 1929
- Cordilura passiva Curran, 1929
- Cordilura picipes (Meigen, 1826)
- Cordilura picticornis Loew, 1864
- Cordilura pilosella (Coquillett, 1898)
- Cordilura pleuritica Loew, 1863
- Cordilura polita (Coquillett, 1898)
- Cordilura praeusta Loew, 1864
- Cordilura proboscidea Zetterstedt, 1838
- Cordilura pubera (Linnaeus, 1758)
- Cordilura pudica Meigen, 1826
- Cordilura qualis (Say, 1829)
- Cordilura remmi Elberg, 1972
- Cordilura remota Ozerov, 1997
- Cordilura richterae Ozerov & Krivosheina
- Cordilura rubifrontata (Becker, 1894)
- Cordilura ruficauda (Zetterstedt, 1838)
- Cordilura rufimana Meigen, 1826
- Cordilura sagittifera Gorodkov, 1974
- Cordilura scapularis Loew, 1869
- Cordilura setosa Loew, 1860
- Cordilura shatalkini Ozerov, 1997
- Cordilura sibirica Gorodkov, 1974
- Cordilura sifneri Ozerov, 2007
- Cordilura similis (Siebke, 1873)
- Cordilura socialis (Becker, 1894)
- Cordilura tarsalis (Malloch, 1923)
- Cordilura tartariana Ozerov, 2007
- Cordilura umbrosa (Loew, 1873)
- Cordilura unicolor (Loew, 1864)
- Cordilura ustulata Zetterstedt, 1838
- Cordilura variabilis Loew, 1876
- Cordilura varicornis Curran, 1929
- Cordilura varipes (Walker, 1849)
- Cordilura zaitzevi Gorodkov, 1974
- Cordilura zetterstedti (Gimmerthal, 1846)
- Cordylura volucricaput Walker, 1849
- † Cordilura exhumata Cockerell, 1916
- † Cordylura vetusta Heer, 1849
