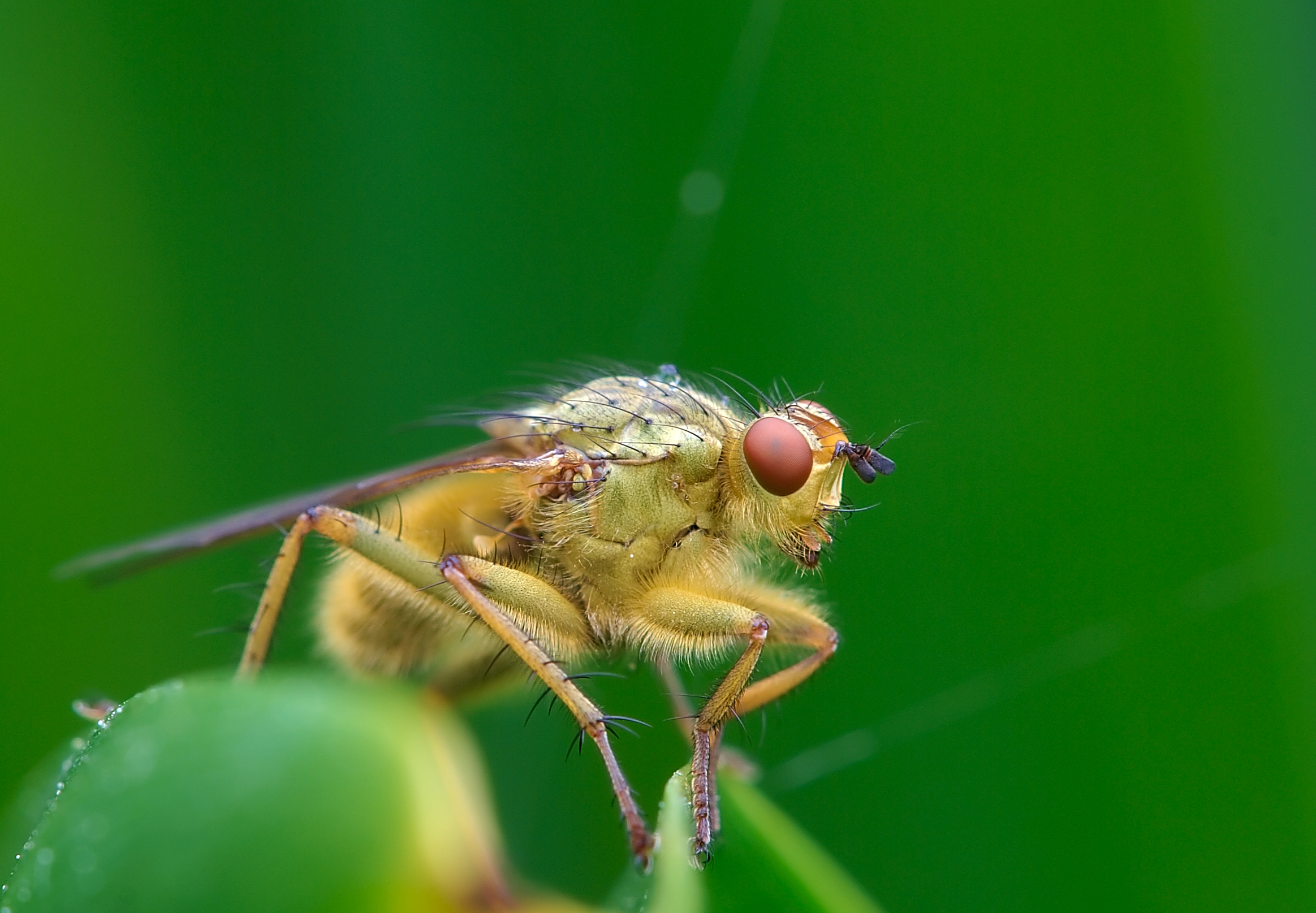
- Male Scathophaga stercoraria, the yellow dung fly

Scientific classification
- Kingdom: Animalia
- Phylum: Arthropoda
- Clade: Pancrustacea
- Class: Insecta
- Order: Diptera
- Superfamily: Muscoidea
- Family: Scathophagidae; Robineau-Desvoidy, 1830

Subfamilies
- Scathophaginae; Delininae

Synonyms
- Cordyluridae; Scatophagidae; Scopeumatidae; Scatomyzidae

= Scathophagidae =

Family of flies

The Scathophagidae are a small family of Muscoidea which are often known as dung flies, although this name is not appropriate except for a few species of the genus Scathophaga which do indeed pass their larval stages in animal dung. The name probably derives from the yellow dung fly (Scathophaga stercoraria), which is one of the most abundant and ubiquitous flies in many parts of the Northern Hemisphere.

== Description ==
The Scathophagidae are medium-sized or quite small flies with a body length of 3.0 to 12.0 mm. The body is slender, especially in males, usually with an elongated, cylindrical abdomen. Many scathophagids appear more robust, however, due to a dense pubescence. Body colour ranges from yellow to black; some species are glossy, but never with a metallic gloss. Some species are bicolored. The eyes are wide-set on the frons in males and females. The bristles on the head, thorax, and legs are well developed. The occiput usually has pale, long hairs. The arista is bare to plumose. Interfrontal bristles are absent. The wing is usually clear, but in some species has distinct marks or darkening at the tip or along the crossveins. The anal vein is long and usually reaches the wing margin. The meron is without bristles along the hind margin, near the posterior spiracle.

Hunting Cordilura on leaves of blackberry (video, 57s)

== Biology ==
The larval biology of this family is actually quite diverse, including plant feeders (leaf miners, stem borers, or feeding in seed capsules), aquatic predators, and predators on other insect larvae in wet situations - such as piles of rotting vegetable matter, seaweed, or dung. The adults are predators on other small insects, and while they are commonly seen on flowers, they are hunting prey there, rather than acting as pollinators. They are, in fact, one of the better predators of blow-flies; thus, they are beneficial agents of biological control. Some species are attracted to dung in great numbers. One of the best-known species of this family is the yellow dung fly (Scathophaga stercoraria) (Linnaeus, 1758). The golden-yellow, densely pilose males of this species gather on cattle dung and may, in parts of its range, be observed at all times of the year.

Worldwide, about 500 described species are placed in 66 genera. The great majority are found in the Palearctic and Nearctic regions and the family is almost confined to the Northern Hemisphere, with only five species so far known from the Southern Hemisphere (and two of these are common northern species of Scathophaga, which have probably been imported with livestock into South Africa and Brazil). The most diverse fauna is found in the Russian Far East, and many new species have been described from this area over the last few decades. Because of the northerly distribution of many species, even within the Holarctic, Vockeroth (1987) has described this as the most northerly distributed of all fly families. He reports that, of the 150 species recorded from Canada, 25 are confined to the Arctic tundra.

Fifty-four species are currently recorded from the British Isles alone and nearly all of these have a Holarctic distribution.

== Genera ==
These 61 genera belong to the family Scathophagidae:

- Acanthocnema Becker, 1894^{i c g b}
- Acerocnema Becker, 1894^{i c g b}
- Allomyella Malloch, 1923^{i c g b}
- Amaurosoma^{c g}
- Americina Malloch, 1923^{i c g b}
- Bostrichopyga^{c g}
- Brooksiella Vockeroth, 1987^{i g b}
- Bucephalina Malloch, 1919^{i c g b}
- Ceratinostoma Meade, 1885^{i c g b}
- Chaetosa Coquillett, 1898^{i c g b}
- Cleigastra^{c g}
- Cochliarium^{c g}
- Conisternum Strobl, 1894^{g}
- Cordilura Fallen, 1810^{i c g b}
- Cordylurella Malloch, 1919^{i c g b}
- Cosmetopus Becker, 1894^{i c g b}
- Delina Robineau-Desvoidy, 1830^{i c g}
- Dromogaster Vockeroth, 1995^{i g b}
- Ernoneura Becker, 1894^{i c g b}
- Eupteromyia^{c g}
- Gimnomera Rondani, 1866^{i c g b}
- Gonarcticus Becker, 1894^{i c g b}
- Gonatherus Rondani, 1856^{i c g b}
- Gymnomera^{c g}
- Hexamitocera Becker, 1894^{i c g b}
- Huckettia Vockeroth, 1995^{i g b}
- Hydromyza Fallen, 1813^{i c g b}
- Jezekia^{c g}
- Langechristia^{c g}
- Leptopa^{c g}
- Megaphthalma Becker, 1894^{i c g b}
- Megaphthalmoides Ringdahl, 1936^{i c g b}
- Microprosopa Becker, 1894^{i c g b}
- Micropselapha^{c g}
- Miroslava^{c g}
- Mixocordylura^{c g}
- Nanna Becker, 1894^{i c g b}
- Neochirosia Malloch, 1917^{i c g b}
- Neorthacheta Vockeroth, 1987^{i c g b}
- Norellia^{c g}
- Norellisoma Hendel, 1910^{i c g b}
- Okeniella Hendel, 1907^{i c g b}
- Opsiomyia Coquillett, 1898^{g}
- Orchidophaga^{c g}
- Orthacheta Becker, 1894^{i c g b}
- Paracosmetopus^{c g}
- Parallelomma Becker, 1894^{i c g b}
- Peratomyia Vockeroth, 1987^{i g b}
- Phrosia^{c g}
- Plethochaeta^{i c g b}
- Pleurochaetella Vockeroth, 1965^{i c g b}
- Pogonota Zetterstedt, 1860^{i c g b}
- Sargella^{c g}
- Scathophaga Meigen, 1803^{i c g b}
- Scatogera^{c g}
- Spathephilus^{c g}
- Spaziphora Rondani, 1856^{i c g b}
- Staegeria Rondani, 1856^{i c g b}
- Suwaia^{c g}
- Synchysa Vockeroth, 1987^{i g b}
- Trichopalpus Rondani, 1856^{i c g}

Data sources: i = ITIS, c = Catalogue of Life, g = GBIF, b = Bugguide.net
