= Carelli =

Carelli is an Italian surname. Notable people with the surname include:

- Alberto Carelli (born 1944), Italian football striker
- Anthony Carelli, American poet
- Anthony Carelli (born 1974), known as Santino Marella, Canadian professional wrestler
- Beniamino Carelli (1833–1921), Italian composer and singing teacher
- Emilio Carelli (born 1952), Italian journalist
- Emma Carelli (1877–1928), Italian operatic soprano
- Francesco Carelli (1758–1832), Italian numismatist and archaeologist
- Gabor Carelli (1915–1999), Hungarian operatic tenor
- Rick Carelli (born 1954), American racecar driver
- Rita Carelli (born 1984), Brazilian writer, actress and director
- a family of Italian painters, including:
  - Consalvo Carelli (1818–1900)
  - Raffaele Carelli (1795–1864)

== See also ==
- Carella
