= Vianelli =

Vianelli is a surname. Notable people with the surname include:

- Achille Vianelli (1803–1894), Italian painter
- Alberto Vianelli (1841–1927), Italian painter
- Pierfranco Vianelli (1946–2026), Italian cyclist
