= Gigante =

Gigante may refer to:

== People ==
- Daniel Gigante (born 1981), Brazilian football player
- Evandro Gigante (born 1985), Brazilian footballer
- Gaetano Gigante (1770–1840), Italian painter
- Giacinto Gigante (1806–1876), Italian painter
- Louis Gigante (1932–2022), Catholic priest and a brother of mobsters Mario and Vincent
- Marcello Gigante (1923–2001), Italian papyrologist
- Maria Gigante (born 1994), Filipino model and beauty pageant titleholder
- Mario Gigante (1923–2022), Caporegime in the Genovese crime family
- Matteo Gigante (born 2002), Italian tennis player
- Michael Gigante (born 1969), American record producer
- Phil Gigante (born 1966), American narrator
- Riccardo Gigante (1881–1945), Italian politician
- Sarah Gigante (born 2000), Australian racing cyclist
- Vincent Gigante (1928–2005), boss of the Genovese crime family
- El Gigante, or Jorge Gonzáles, former basketball player and professional wrestler

== Media ==
- Gigante (film), a 2009 Uruguayan film
- Sábado Gigante ("Giant Saturday"), an American Spanish-language TV program

== Other ==
- Gigante, Huila, Colombia
- Supermercados Gigante, a Mexican supermarket chain

== See also ==
- Gigantes (disambiguation)
