= Giacinto Diano =

Italian painter (1731–1803)

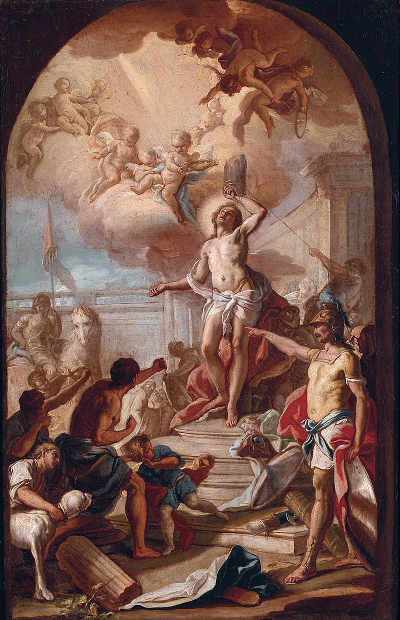
The Martyrdom of St. Sebastian

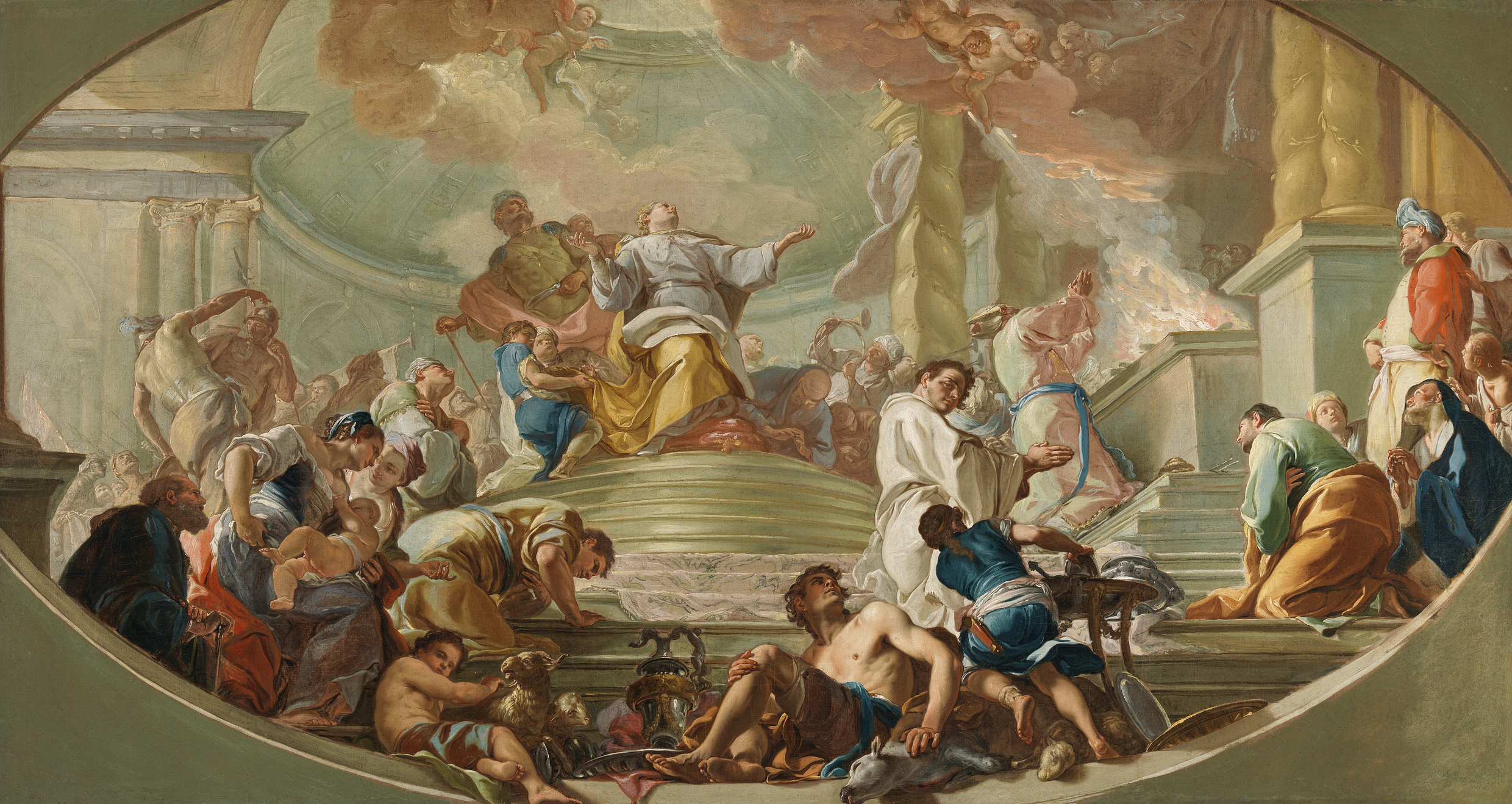
The Dedication of the Temple in Jerusalem

Giacinto Diano or Diana (28 March 1731 – 13 August 1803) was an Italian painter, active in Southern Italy in a style that mixes Rococo and Neoclassicism.

== Biography ==
He was born in Pozzuoli. He began his training in the studio of Francesco De Mura, whose work would influence his early compositions. He worked briefly in Rome with Anton Raphael Mengs, before settling in Naples in 1752. At that time Naples was enjoying period of great artistic and cultural achievement, due to the presence of the enlightened King Charles III. Nicknamed o Puzzulaniello or referred to as il Pozzolano, Diano took little time to establish a prominent place in the art scene.

In 1773, he was named a professor of drawing at the Accademia del Disegno. Six years later, he was appointed Master of Painting at the Accademia di Belle Art. He would remain until 1782. Despite his numerous duties there, he continued to paint on private commission.

He was very prolific, and his works may be seen in churches throughout Southern Italy. Among his best known are:

- Frescoes for the Palazzo Francavilla (now Palazzo Cellammare)
- Frescoes for the Hospital of Santa Maria della Pace
- Frescoes for the church of the Santissima Trinità dei Pellegrini.
- Two canvases for the church of Sant'Agostino alla Zecca
- Paintings in the chapels at San Pietro ad Aram and the church of the Nunziata.

He spent his last years, ill and poverty stricken, in a small house in the Quartieri Spagnoli. He was buried at the church of the Santissima Trinità.

The painter and engraver Gaetano Gigante was one of his best-known pupils. Gaetano's son, Giacinto (named after Diano) was one of the founders of the School of Posillipo.
