= Carl Götzloff =

German painter (1799–1866)

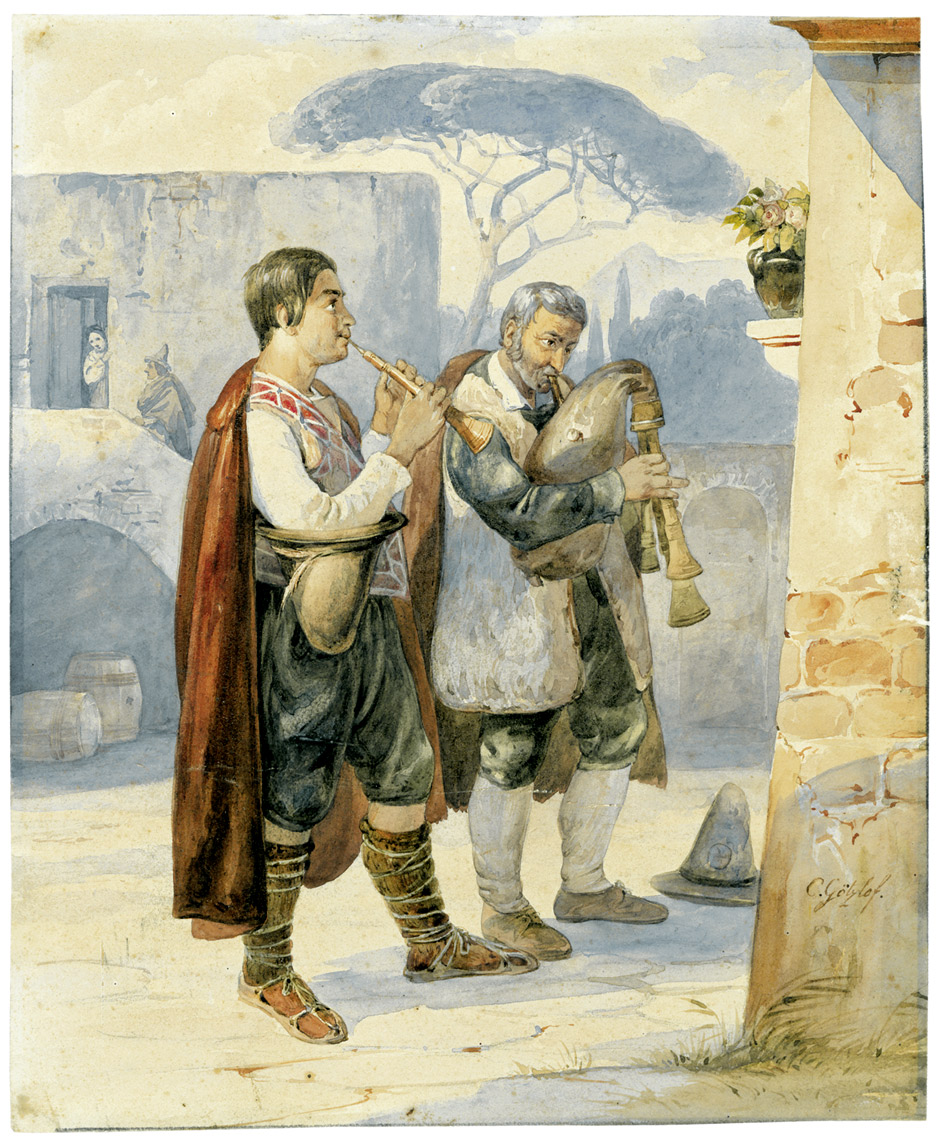
Two Pipers (1828) Watercolor on vellum

Carl Wilhelm Götzloff (27 September 1799 – 18 January 1866) was a German painter.

== Life ==
Born in Dresden, Götzloff was the youngest of three children born to Friedrich Adrian Götzloff, a town constable. From 1814 to 1821, he attended the Dresden Academy of Fine Arts where he studied under Caspar David Friedrich and Johan Christian Dahl, among others.

As early as 1820, he was awarded a prize for his landscape paintings at an Academy exhibition. A scholarship enabled him to undertake a study trip throughout Germany and Switzerland, eventually travelling to Rome with fellow-student Anton Josef Dräger. From 1822 to 1824, several more trips to Italy and the surrounding regions followed. Towards the end of that year, he accompanied Baron Karl Friedrich Emich von Uexküll, an art collector, on a trip to Sicily and Malta.

=== Moving to Naples ===
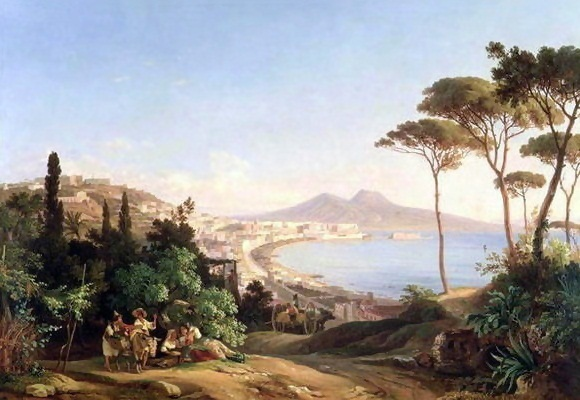
View of Naples (1837)

As it turned out, the Baron and his family became Götzloff's employers and he relocated permanently to Naples in 1825, where he shared an apartment with Antonie Sminck Pitloo, Giacinto Gigante and Teodoro Duclère. That same year, he was named an honorary member of the Dresden Academy. In 1827, he served as art teacher to Prince Leopold I.

In 1835 he was appointed Court Painter to Ferdinand II, King of the Two Sicilies. Before taking up that position, he briefly returned to Dresden where he became a full member of the Academy and married Louisa Chentrens.

In 1846, Friedrich Wilhelm IV appointed him the "Agent for Antiquities" for the museums of Berlin. His reputation had spread so far at this point that he began to receive commissions from the Royal Family in Russia.

=== Financial difficulties ===
In 1848, he and his family moved to Sorrento to escape the political unrest, which also forced him to seek employment in Berlin with help from his friend August Kestner. He accompanied the 4th Bernese regiment during its conquest of Catania in April, 1849. The next year, he returned to Naples and, in 1852, became a Knight in the Order of Leopold. His wife died in 1855, and he made more desperate efforts to secure employment back home.

His hopes of returning to Germany were dashed in 1861, when several paintings he sent to an art exhibition in Dresden failed to be sold. His finances were strained to the breaking point in 1864 when he had to pay a ransom to bandits for the release of his son Guido. He died poor in 1866 in Naples.
