= Carella =

Carella is an Italian surname. Notable people with the surname include:

- Enzo Carella (1952–2017), Italian singer-songwriter
- Emmanuel Carella (born 1982), Australian singer
- C. J. Carella, American RPG maker and novelist
- Cristiana Carella (born 2000), known as Senza Cri, Italian singer-songwriter
- Steve Carella, detective in the American television show 87th Precinct
- Tony Carella, Canadian politician

== See also ==
- Carelli
- Chezala carella, moth in the family Oecophoridae
