= Egidio De Maulo =

Italian painter (1840–1922)

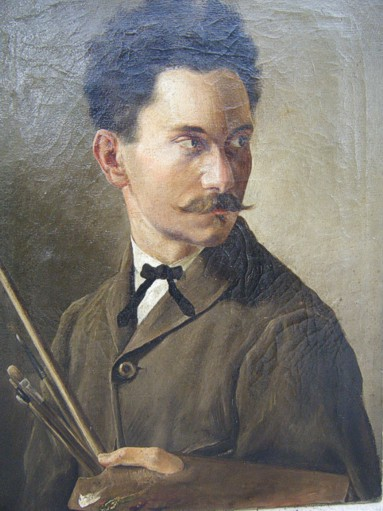
Self-portrait of Egidio De Maulo (1861)

Egidio De Maulo (4 September 1840 – 14 November 1922) was an Italian painter mainly of landscapes and still lifes.

Born in Giulianova, Italy, a young Egidio moved to Naples where he successfully painted landscapes and still lifes among the painters who were part of the School of Posillipo. He was a disciple of the Neapolitan painter Consalvo Carelli, father-in-law of Vincenzo Bindi, the patron who donated his collection of paintings that now make a part of the Gallery Giuliese at the Museo D'arte dello Splendore in Giulianova, Italy. While in Naples, Egidio exhibited a group of still lifes: A group of game, A hare and A duck. In 1893 his entry in the International Exhibition at the Principality of Monaco received the Bronze Medal. The Pinacoteca Civica of Teramo, Italy contains a painting Cacciagione (Still life of Game). His Madonna and Child is found in the chapel of Bartolomei in the church of San Gaetano in Giulianova. He died in Rome in 1922.

He adhered to landscapes of Abruzzo and marinas surroundings Naples. He also painted portraits, but was best known as an author of still life (a head of an old man and a rose button, exhibited in Milan in 1872). With the latter genre he appeared more frequently in exhibitions with still life (A hare, Group of wild game and, a mallard exhibited in Florence in 1891–1892; then the mallard was exhibited in Rome in 1900).

== See also ==
- http://www.istitutomatteucci.it/en/dictionary-of-artists/de-maulo-egidio
- culturaitalia
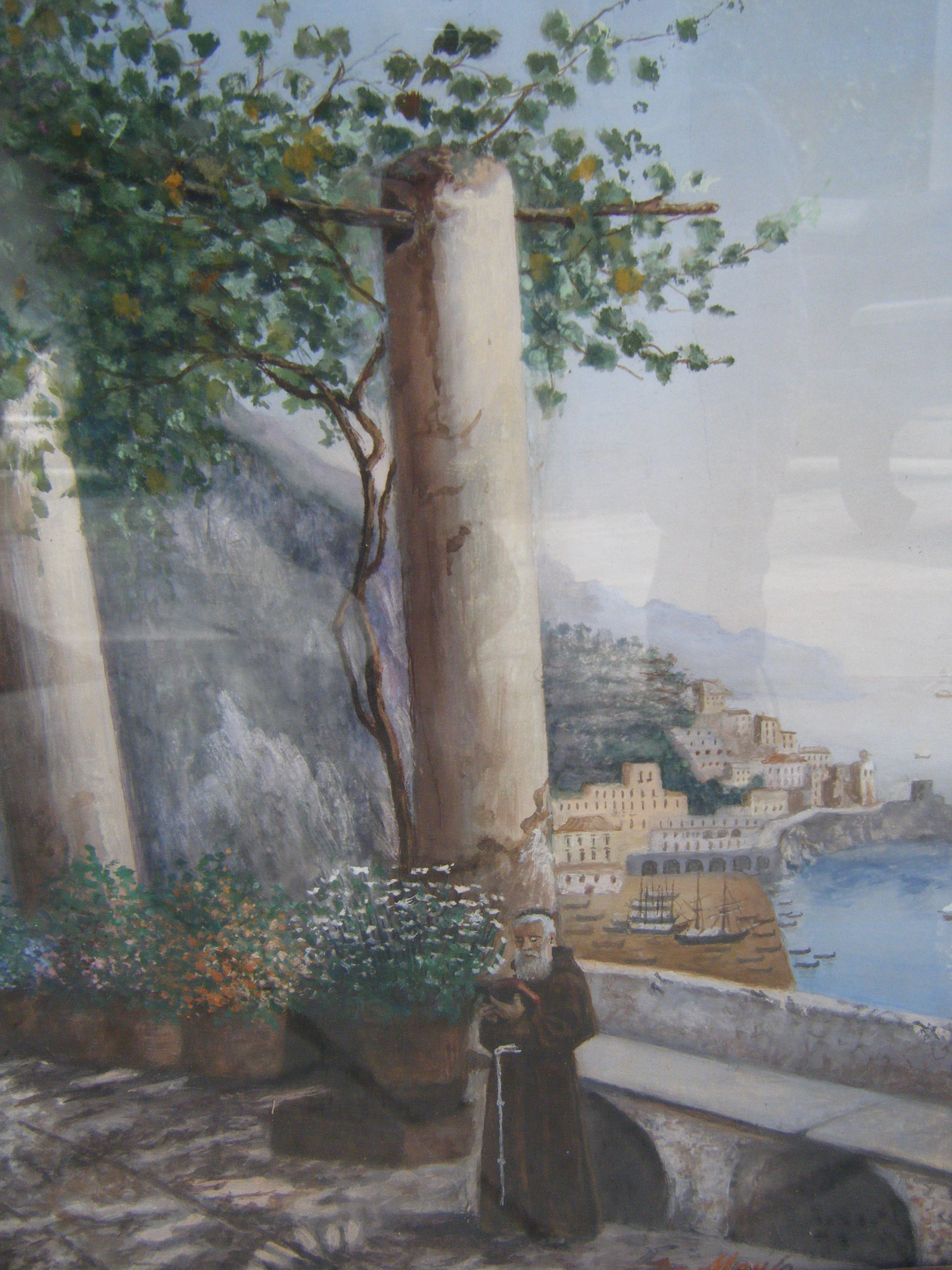
Amalfi
