= Gigantes (disambiguation) =

The Gigantes are a race of giants in Greek mythology.

Gigantes may also refer to:

== Places ==
- Los Gigantes, a resort town on Canary Island, Tenerife
- Islas de Gigantes, an island chain in the Philippines
- Las islas de los Gigantes, a name given by Christopher Columbus to the ABC islands

== Sports teams ==
- Gigantes de Carolina (disambiguation)
- Gigantes del Cibao, a Dominican Winter League baseball team
- Gigantes de Guayana, a Venezuelan basketball team
- Gigantes del Sur, an Argentine volleyball team
- Los Gigantes, the Spanish-language name used by the San Francisco Giants

== People ==
- Evelyn Gigantes (1942–2026), Canadian politician
- Philippe Gigantès (1923–2004), Greek journalist, war correspondent, Korean War prisoner of war, author, television commentator, Greek Minister of Culture and Canadian senator
- Gigantes, a ring name of American professional wrestler Jerry Tuite (1966–2003)

== Other uses ==
- Gigantes y cabezudos, costumed figures in Spanish festivals
- Os Gigantes (The Giants), a Brazilian telenovela which aired from 1979 to 1980
- "Gigantes" (song), a 2014 song by Spanish singer Ruth Lorenzo

== See also ==
- Gigantes or gigandes plaki, a Greek bean dish
- Gigante (disambiguation)
