= Achille Vianelli =

Italian painter (1803–1894)

Achille Vianelli or Vianelly (21 December 1803 – 2 April 1894) was an Italian painter of landscapes with genre scenes, often in watercolor.

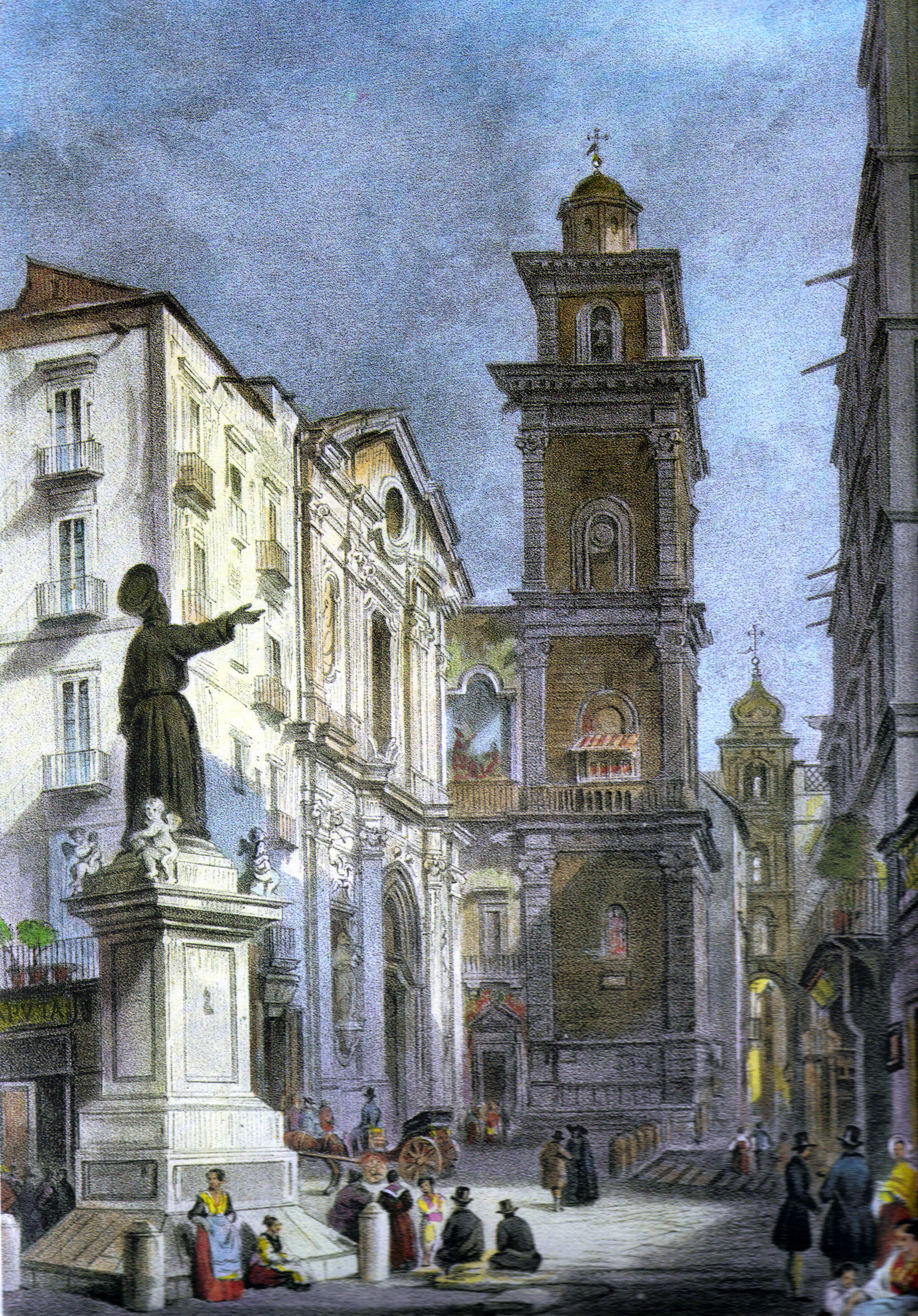
Piazza San Gaetano and San Lorenzo Maggiore in Naples, c. 1845

He was born in Porto Maurizio; he moved as a child to Otranto, where his father was consul for the French government. In 1819, he moved to Naples, where he first worked in the Royal Topographic Office, where he met Giacinto Gigante. With Gigante, he began training first under Jakob Wilhelm Hüber, then in the Academy under Pitloo. He published (with Gigante and others) a series of lithographs in a Viaggio pittorico nel Regno delle Due Sicilie (1829–1834). In 1848, he moved to Benevento, where he continued drawing and painting. He married Gigante's sister, and vice versa, and is considered a member of the School of Posillipo. His son, Alberto Vianelli, also a landscape painter moved to Paris. Vianelli's sister, Flora, married Theodore Witting, a German landscape artist and engraver. His nephew Gustavo Witting, also became a landscape painter.

He was a knight of the Order of Francesco I of the Two Sicilies, and honorary professor of the Academy of Fine Arts of Naples.

Vianelli died in Benevento on 2 April 1894.
