= Salvatore Fergola =

Italian painter (1799–1874)

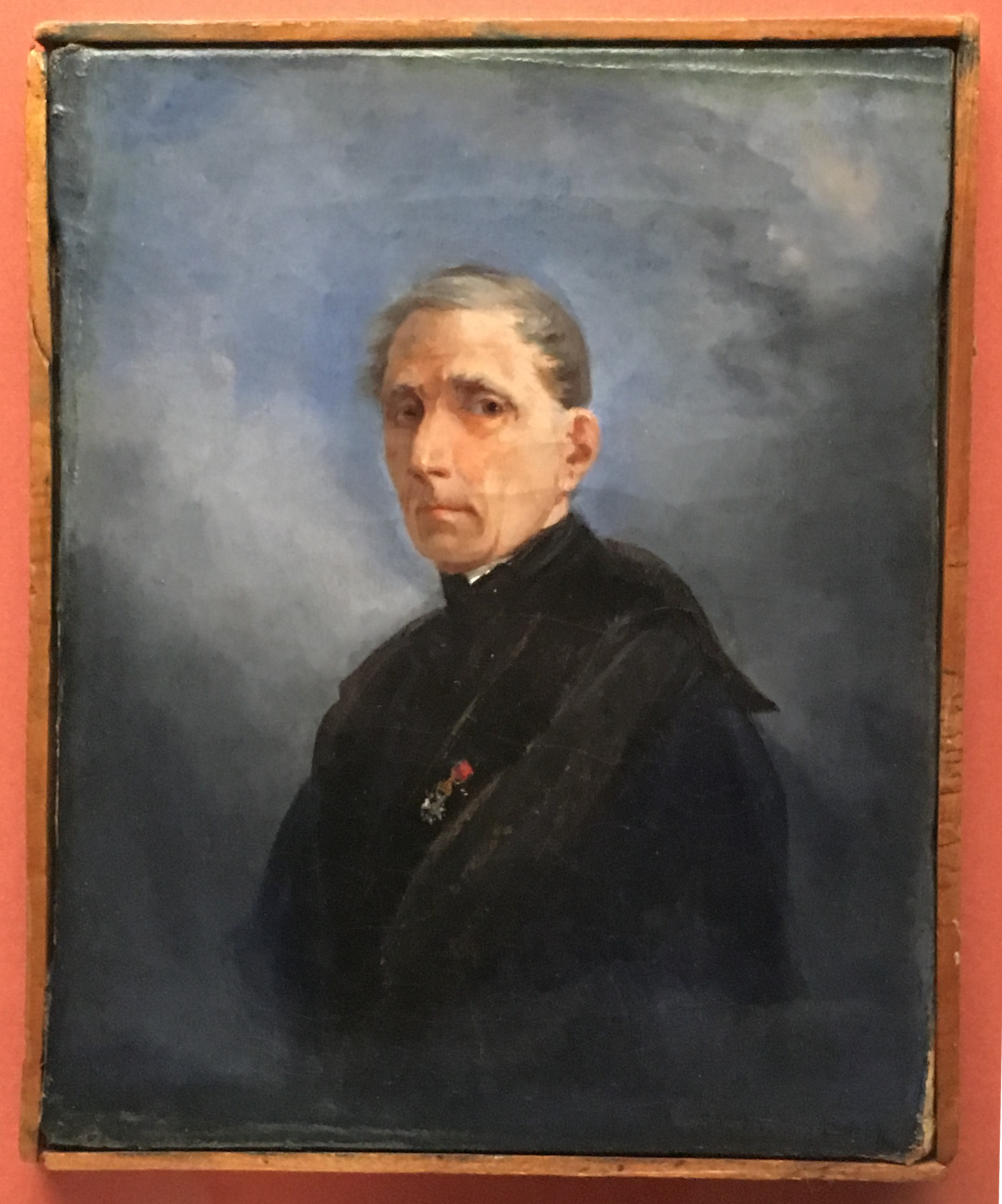
Self-portrait (1864)

Salvatore Fergola (24 April 1799 – 7 March 1874) was an Italian painter, mainly of landscapes or vedute in and around his native Naples. He is considered a member of the School of Posillipo.

== Biography ==
He was born in Naples. He was the son of Luigi Fergola and his wife, Teresa Conti. Luigi Fergola was an engraver of landscapes. Salvatore was educated in literature and architecture. He became a follower of Jakob Philipp Hackert, who had also mentored his father. Like his father, and other painters such as Giacinto Gigante, he worked in the Royal Topographic office for some time. Fergola was patronized by the Bourbon Court. In 1819 the future Francesco I of the Two Sicilies commissioned views of Naples, including Naples from Capodimonte, Naples from Marinella, Naples from Ponte della Maddalena and a Veduta of the Botanical Gardens.

In 1827, he was nominated honorary professor to the Royal Institute of Arts (Real Istituto di Belle Arti (now the Accademia di Belle Arti di Napoli). Among his pupils was Achille Vertunni, Ignazio Lavagna and Giuseppe Benassai. He died in Naples in 1874.

He was often commissioned to commemorate government works and events.

- Inauguration of the first railway in Italy, the Naples–Portici line, (Museo di San Martino)
- Construction of the first iron suspension bridge in Italy (Ponte Real Ferdinando sul Garigliano).
- Construction of the Chapel in the Campo di Marte (Reggia di Caserta)
- Train station for line to Castellammare (1845) (Reggia di Caserta)

=== Also of note ===
- Interior of Sala Tarsia
- Bridge over Garigliano (Palace of Capodimonte)
- Waterfall (Museo di San Martino)
- Cain persecuted by ire of God (1849) (Royal Palace of Naples)
- Cain and Abel (Avvocatura dello Stato, Naples)
- Gesìr che placa la tempesta (Palace of Capodimonte)
- San Francesco di Paola in Prayer
- Christ in Gesthemane (1858) (Gallery of the Academy of Fine Arts of Naples)
- Rest during Flight to Egypt (Royal Palace of Naples)

== Selected paintings ==
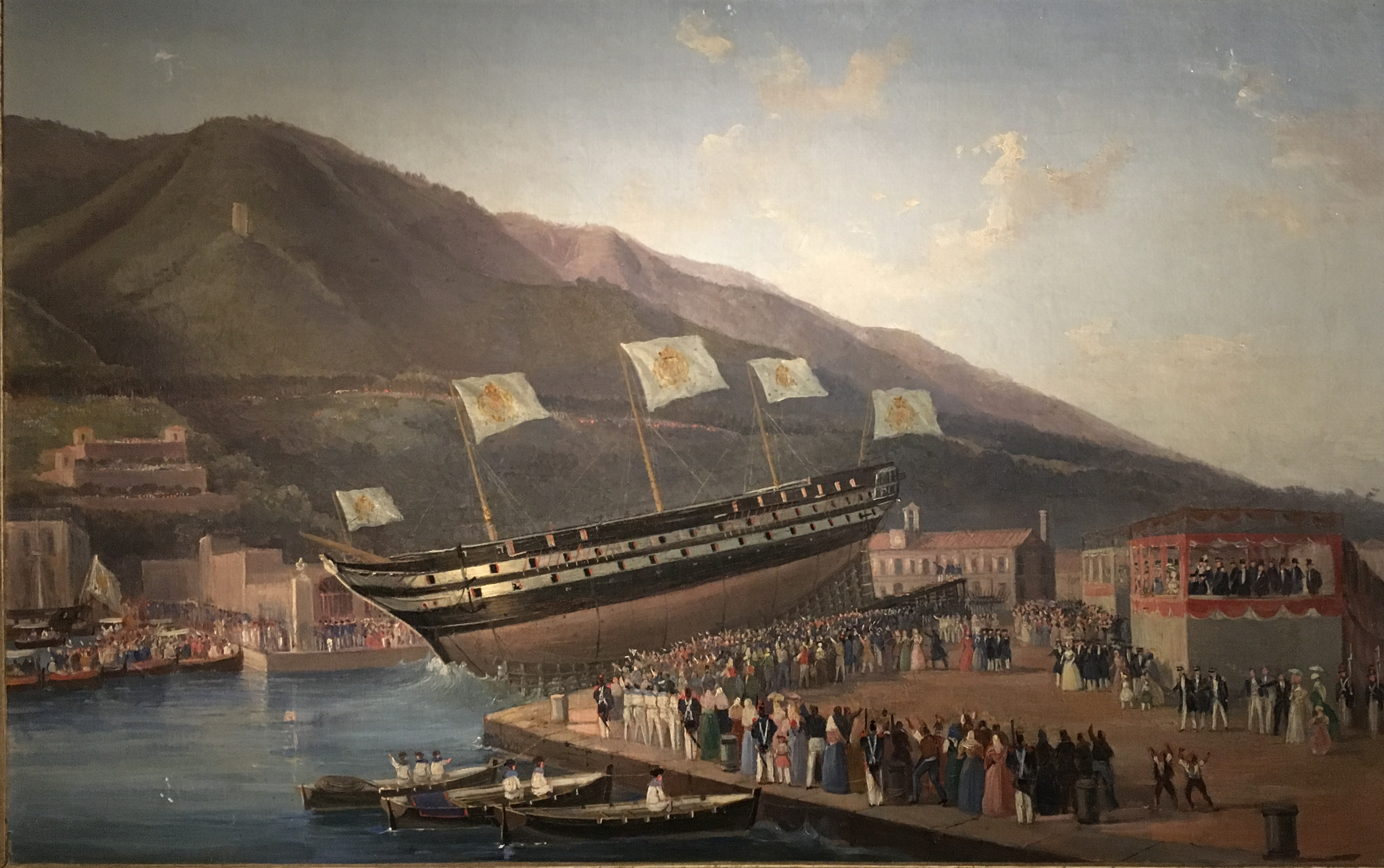
Launching of the Vesuvio in Castellammare di Stabia

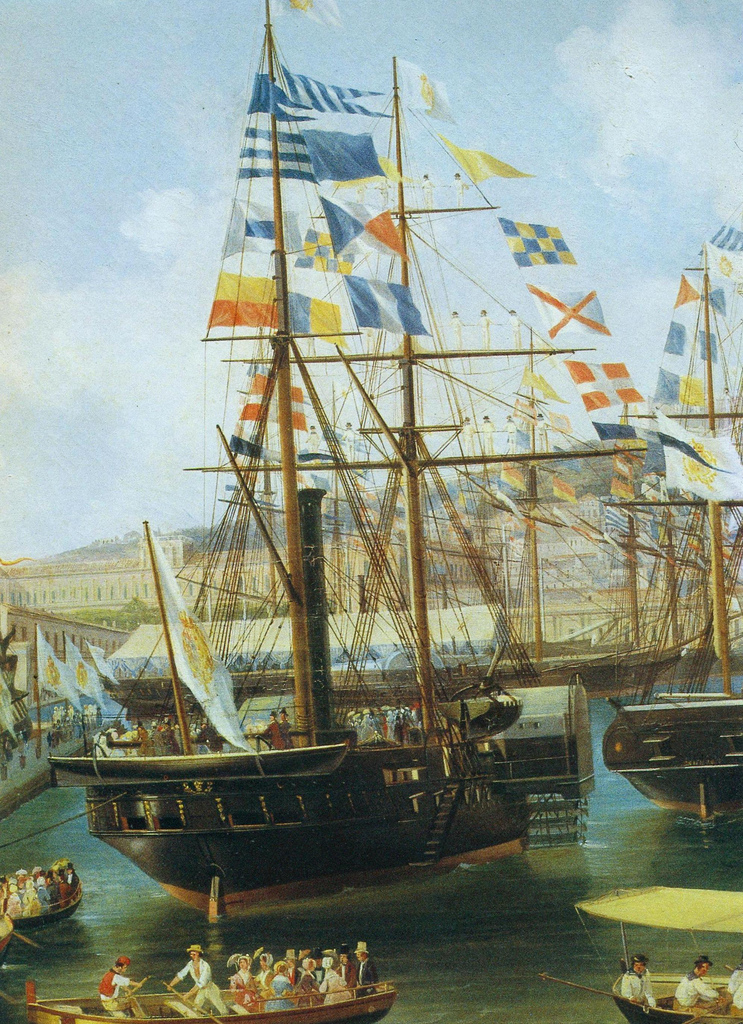
The Steam Frigate, Ercole

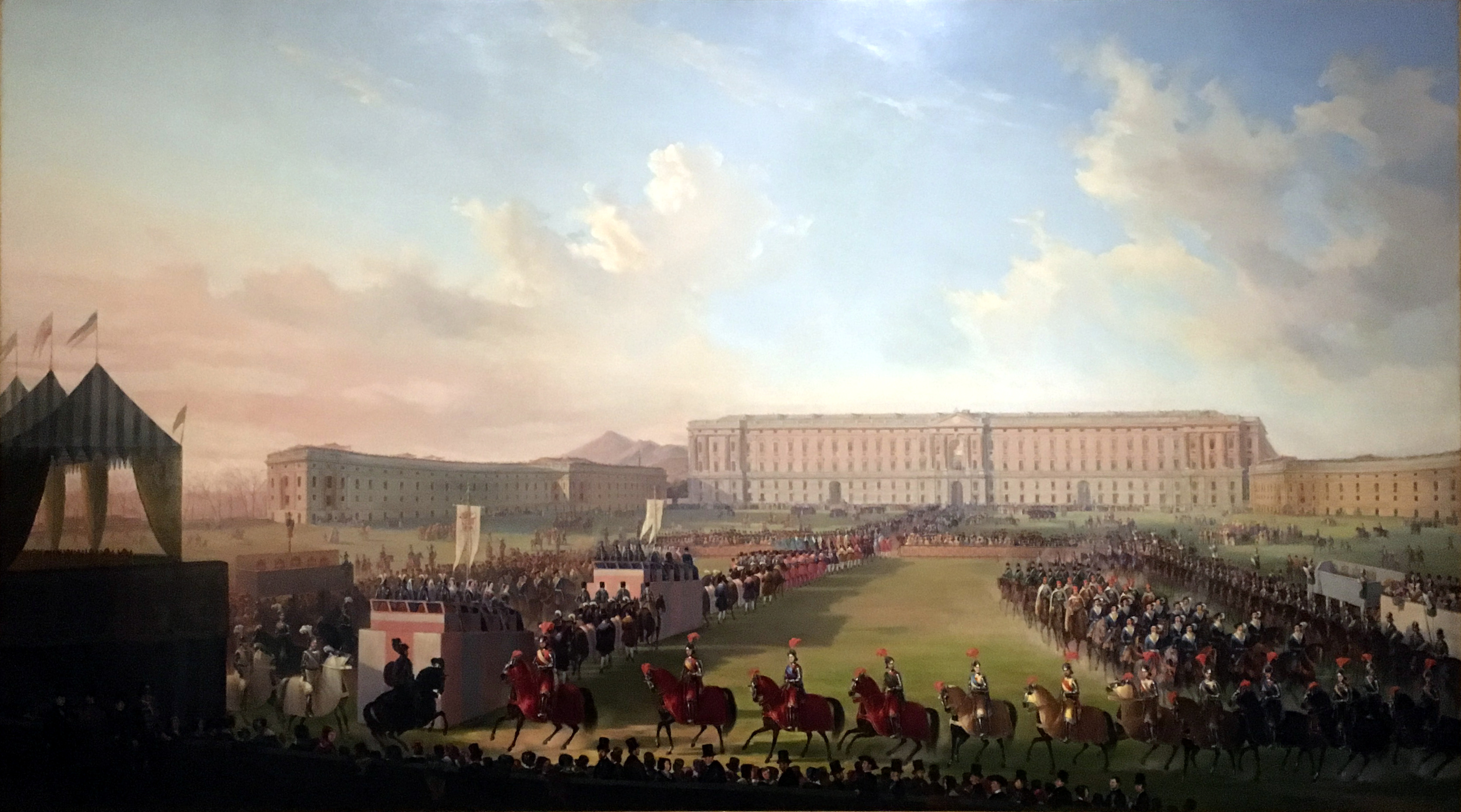
The Caserta Tournament: Parade of the Ladies and Knights

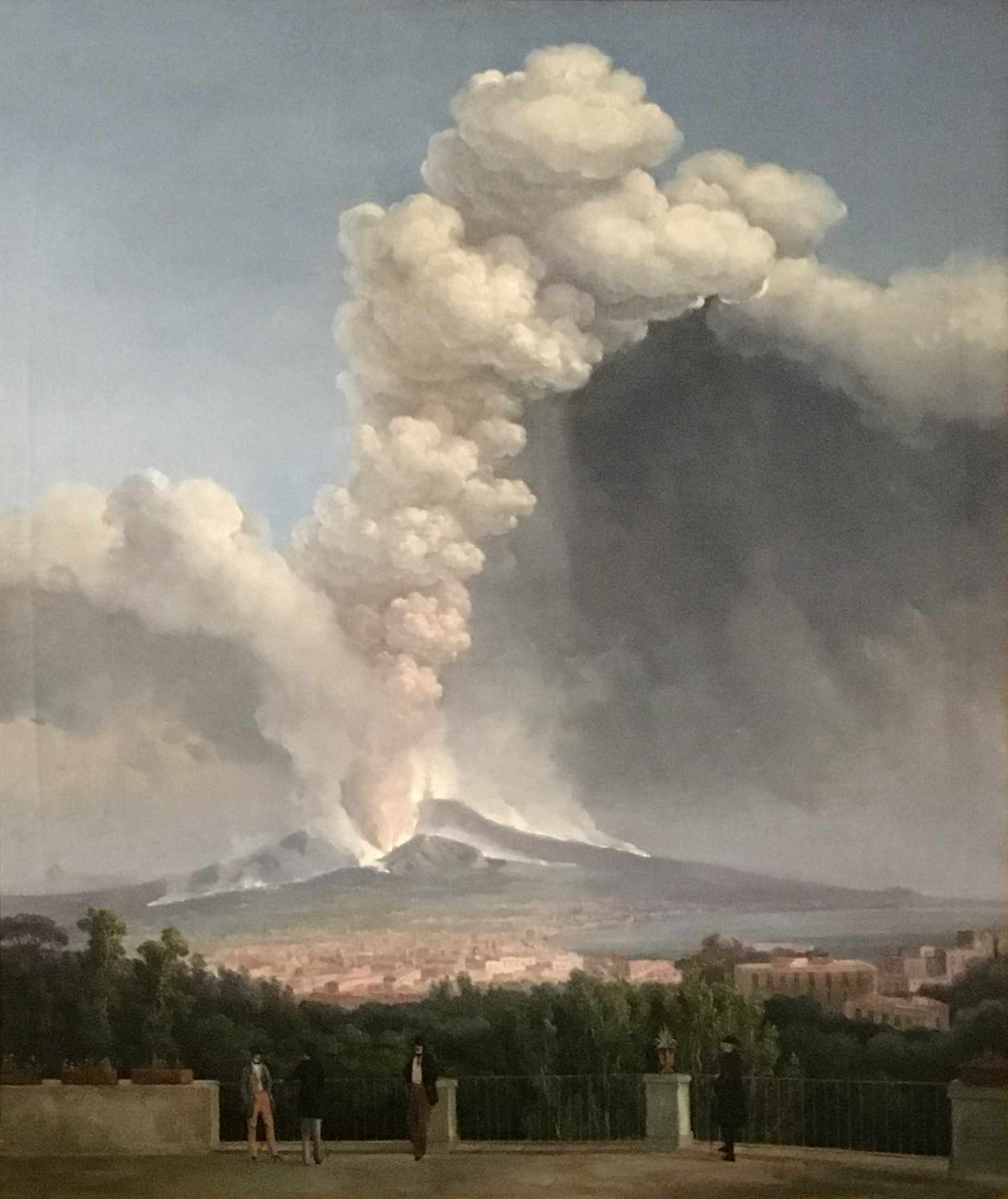
An Eruption of Vesuvius, with a View of Naples

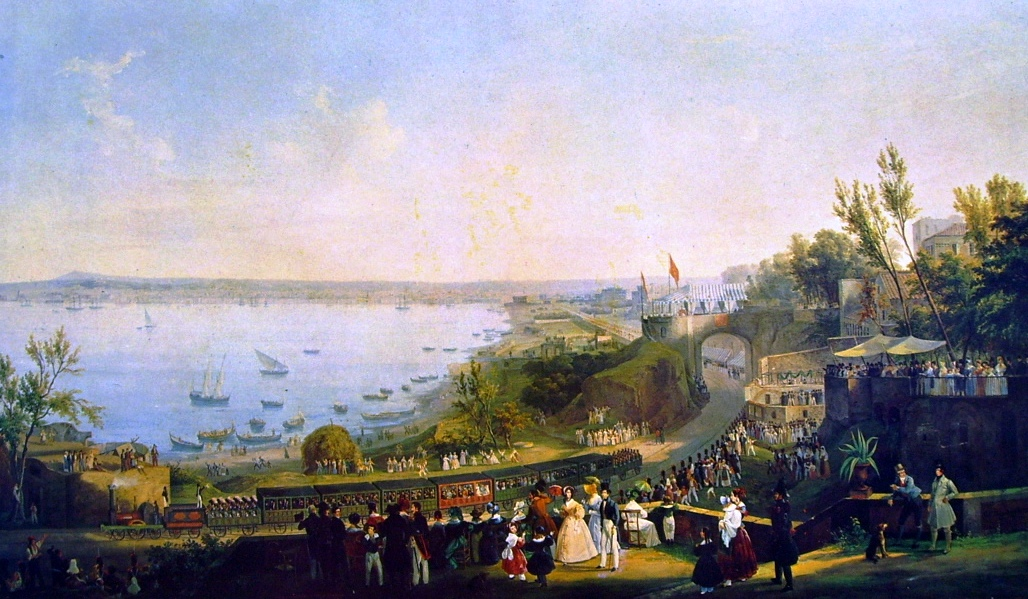
The Inauguration of the Naples-Portici Railway
