= Naples–Portici railway =

First Italian railway line (opened 1839)

Naples–Portici
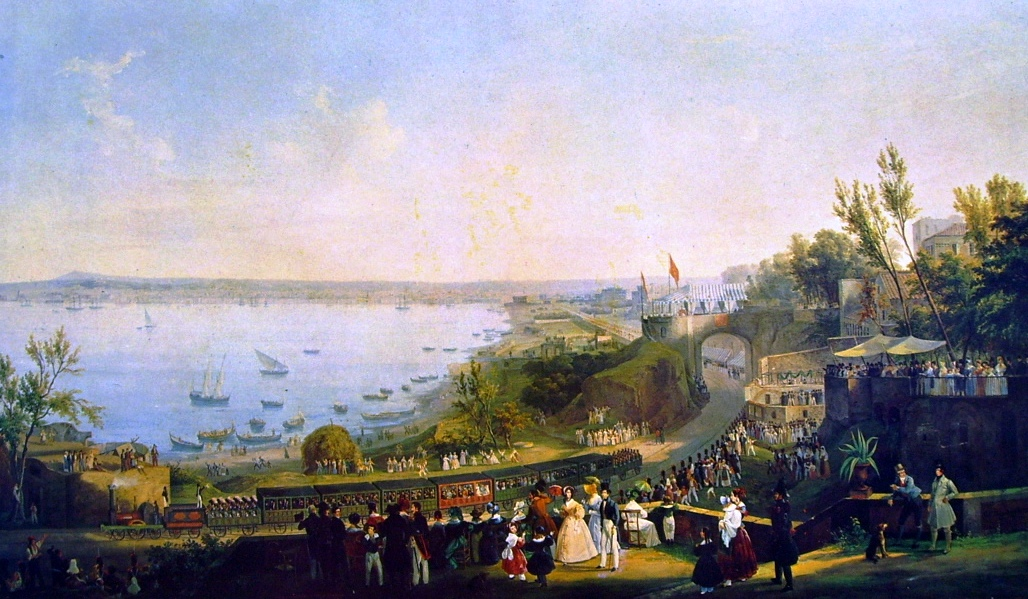
- Inauguration of the Naples–Portici railway, by Salvatore Fergola

Overview
- Native name: Napoli–Portici (Italian); Napule–Puortece (Neapolitan)
- Locale: Italy (Naples)

Service
- Type: first railway in Italy

History
- Opened: 1839; 186 years ago
- Naples (Bayard): 1839–1891
- Naples Porta Nolana: from 1891

Technical
- Line length: 7.25 kilometres (4.5 mi)
- Track gauge: 1,435 mm (4 ft 8½ in)
Route map
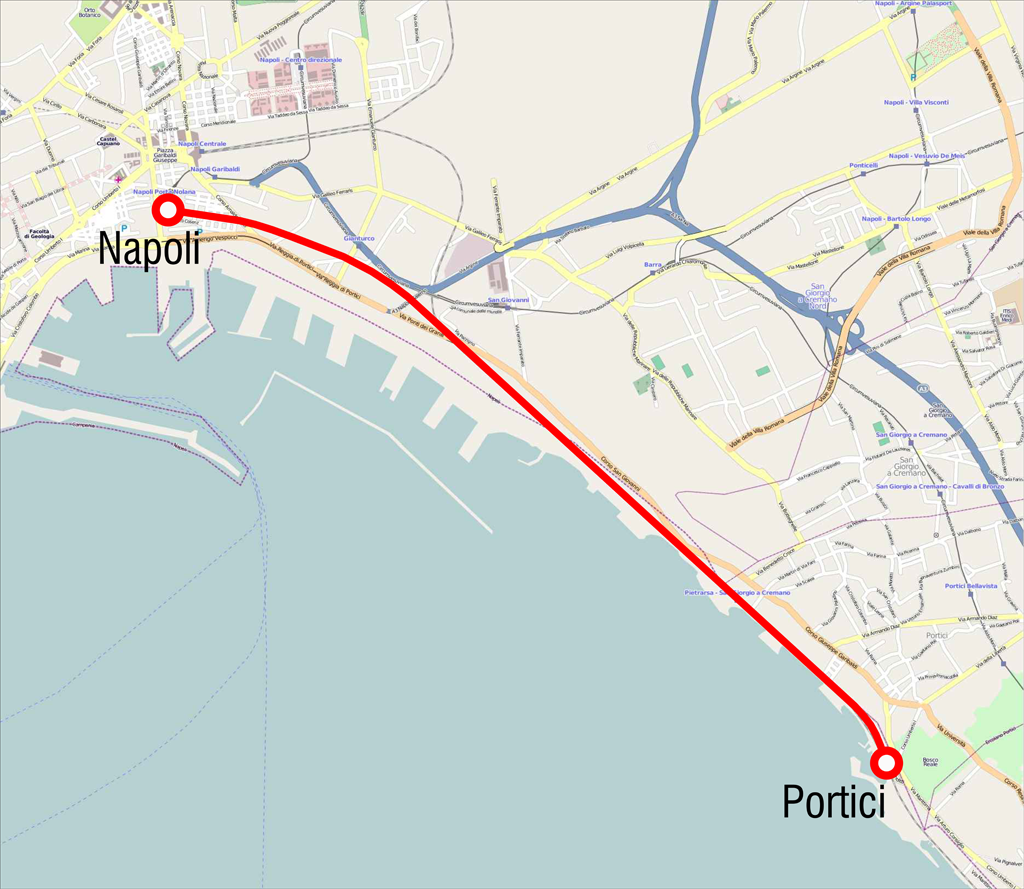

The Naples–Portici railway (Italian: ferrovia Napoli–Portici) was the first Italian railway line, built by the Bayard Company and opened in 1839. It now forms part of the Naples–Salerno line.

== Geography ==
The initial line was a double track of 7.25 kilometres (4.5 mi). It ran from the current site of Corso Garibaldi in Naples to the Royal Palace of Portici, at the foot of Mount Vesuvius, now used by the Faculty of Agriculture of the University of Naples Federico II.

== History ==
A Frenchman promoted the line, Armand Bayard de la Vingtrie, who received a concession to build it in February 1837 from King Ferdinand II of the Two Sicilies. The concession authorised Bayard to build a railway from the current location of Napoli Centrale railway station outside the old walls of Naples along the Bay of Naples to Nocera Inferiore on the Sorrentine Peninsula, a distance of 35.8 kilometres (22.2 mi), with possible extensions to Salerno and Avellino, both through mountainous country. The line was built of wrought iron rails mounted on large cubic stone sunk into the ground (as wooden sleepers used to distribute weights had not been invented), and the gauge was maintained occasionally with transverse bars.

Three steam locomotives were imported from Longridge and Co of England: two 2-2-2 locomotives for passenger traffic, Bayard and Vesuvio, and one locomotive for goods traffic; rolling stock was built locally. The king opened the first 7.25 kilometres (4.5 mi) of the line from Naples to Portici on 3 October 1839. By the end of 1839, it had carried 131,116 passengers. It was extended to Castellammare di Stabia in 1842 and Nocera in 1844.
