= Alberto Vianelli =

Italian painter (1841–1927)

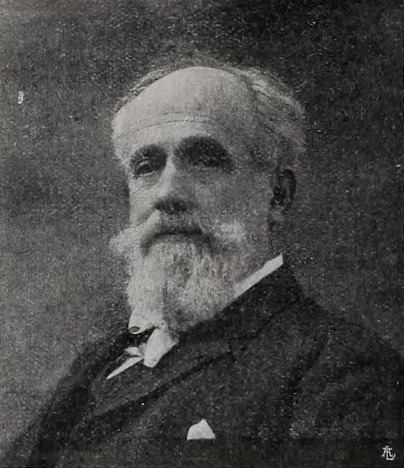
- Born: 5 June 1841; Cava de' Tirreni
- Died: 1927
- Occupation: Painter
- Father: Achille Vianelli
- Awards: Knight of the Order of the Crown of Italy

Alberto Giacomo Vianelli (June 5, 1841 – 1927) was an Italian painter.

== Biography ==
Vianelli was born in Cava de' Tirreni, Naples. He trained under his father, the painter Achille Vianelli, and his uncle the Cavalier Giacinto Gigante. He then moved to Paris, where in 1875 he studied figure painting under Gustave Boulanger and Jules Lefebvre. His first paintings, two small landscapes, were exhibited in the 1877 Salon di Paris: Fundarà ad Ischia and Avanzi del teatro romano a Benevento.

In 1878, he exhibited in Paris and Venice, an oil painting titled L' Aieul; and a watercolor, depicting a candle-lit scene, titled Dans les coulisse. In 1879, he exhibited Une follìe, depicting a young woman at a masked ball. His paintings depict scenes of elegant life. Among his works: Cinq-cent (exhibited at Paris, London, and Brussels); Cage dorée; Triste nouvelle; Dolce far niente; a portrait of Lady Erskine; Un giuri (exhibited at the 1885 Salon, then at Amiens where it won a first class medal.

In 1886, he exhibited in Paris the following works: Interior of Rustic House in Normandy exhibited at the Exposition Nazionale of Venice, along with l'Aieule. In 1887, he was awarded Knight's Cross of the Order of the Crown of Italy. At 1881 Salon, he displayed: Solo, a large half-figure; Louis XV; and the Interno Normanno. He also painted watercolors.
