= Teodoro Duclère =

Italian painter

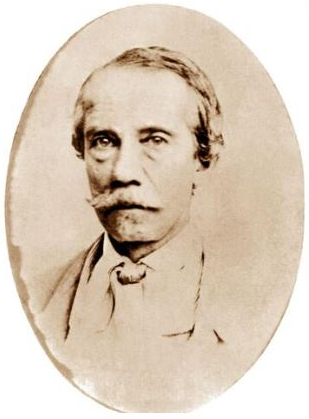
Teodoro Duclère (c.1867)

Carlo Teodoro Duclère (24 May 1812 – 1869) was an Italian landscape painter; associated with the School of Posillipo.

== Biography ==
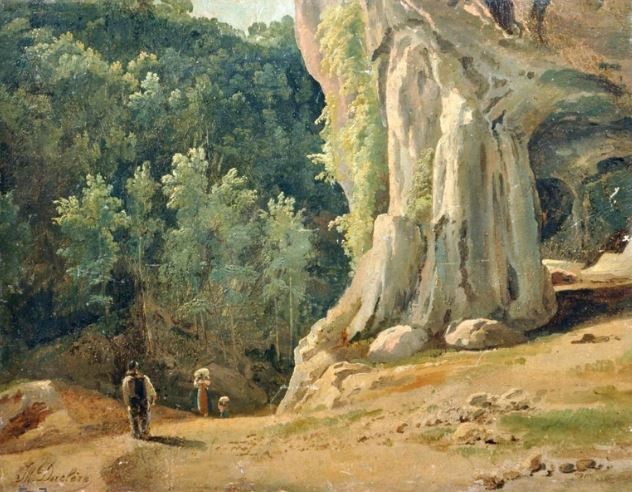
The Cave of the Cumaean Sibyl

He was born in Naples. His father, Jacques-François Théodore Duclère, born around 1788, was from Seine-et-Marne, France, and came to Italy during the Napoleonic Wars. He met and married Teodoro's future mother, Costanza Lepori, in Rome and they settled in Naples, where he took a job as a customs officer.

He was attracted to the arts at an early age, and began by sitting in on lessons at the studios of the Dutch-born painter, Antonie Sminck Pitloo. When he was old enough, he enrolled at the Academy of Fine Arts, Naples, where Pitloo was appointed to the landscape painting chair. From 1829 to 1831, he regularly participated in the Academy's competitions. During his time there, he also came under the influence of the School of Posillipo, led by Salvatore Fergola and Giacinto Gigante.

After completing his studies, Duclère toured Southern Italy, visiting Sicily, Apulia, and Campania. Upon returning, in 1838, he married Pitloo's daughter, Sofia. They would have five daughters of their own.

In 1849, Duclère was appointed to a committee considering reforming the Academy. In 1861, he became a member of the Academy, largely upon the recommendation of Eugenio Emanuele di Savoia-Villafranca, an aide to King Victor Emmanuel II, who wanted to purge public institutions of those who had opposed Italian unification. He served as chief assistant to the professor of landscape painting.

His activities in the following years are not well-documented, although Duclère is known to have spent some time in Sorrento, as an art teacher for Count Pompeo Correale, a patron of the arts who had converted his villa into a refuge for artists and writers. After Duclère's death, in Naples on an unknown date in 1869, Correale purchased his personal collection, which is now preserved at the Museo Correale.

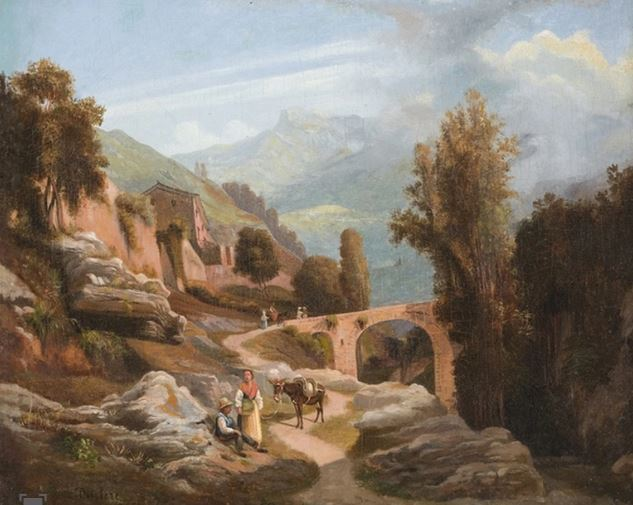
The Bridge at Cava de' Tirreni

Fifteen of Duclère's best-known works may be seen at the Academy's gallery. His paintings are also on display at the Museo di Capodimonte and the Municipal Art Gallery in Giulianova, among others.
