= Gaetano Gigante =

Italian artist (1770–1840)

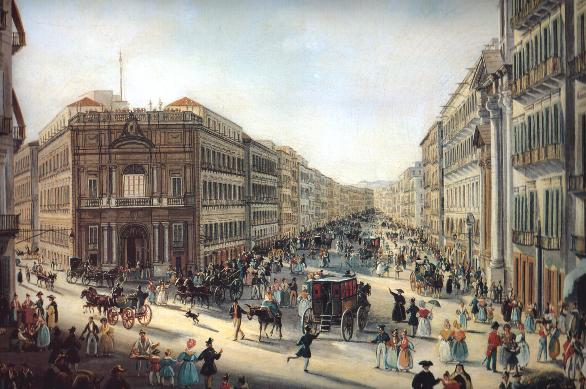
Largo dello Spirito Santo, Naples

Gaetano Gigante (1770 – 23 September 1840) was an Italian painter and engraver.

== Biography ==
Born in Naples, he was the son of Francesco Gigante; a fisherman. His artistic training took place in the workshops of Giacinto Diano at the Royal Academy of Design.

His first works were mostly ecclesiastical commissions for religious paintings throughout Campania. He was almost forty before he added genre painting to his repertoire. His first work in that style depicted a banquet held by the legionnaires of Joachim Murat, commissioned by the Palace of Caserta. He eventually specialized in depicting local costumes and customs.

Most of his major religious works, however, also came during his later years. From 1818 to 1822, he was involved in creating a series of frescoes, with scenes from the story of Mary and Jesus, at the church of Santa Maria di Piedigrotta. During that same period he also created an altarpiece at the church of Santa Maria di Caravaggio and an Assumption at the church of Santa Maria delle Vigna in Pietravairano.

He presented three works at the Museo Borbonico in 1830, and two more in 1833, which were awarded a silver medal.

In 1801, he married Anna Maria Fatali. He was the father of Giacinto Gigante, named after his teacher; one of the founders of the School of Posillipo. His seven other children included Achille Gigante (1824–1846), who was a lithographer. Four died while they were still very young.

Gigante died in 1840 in Naples.

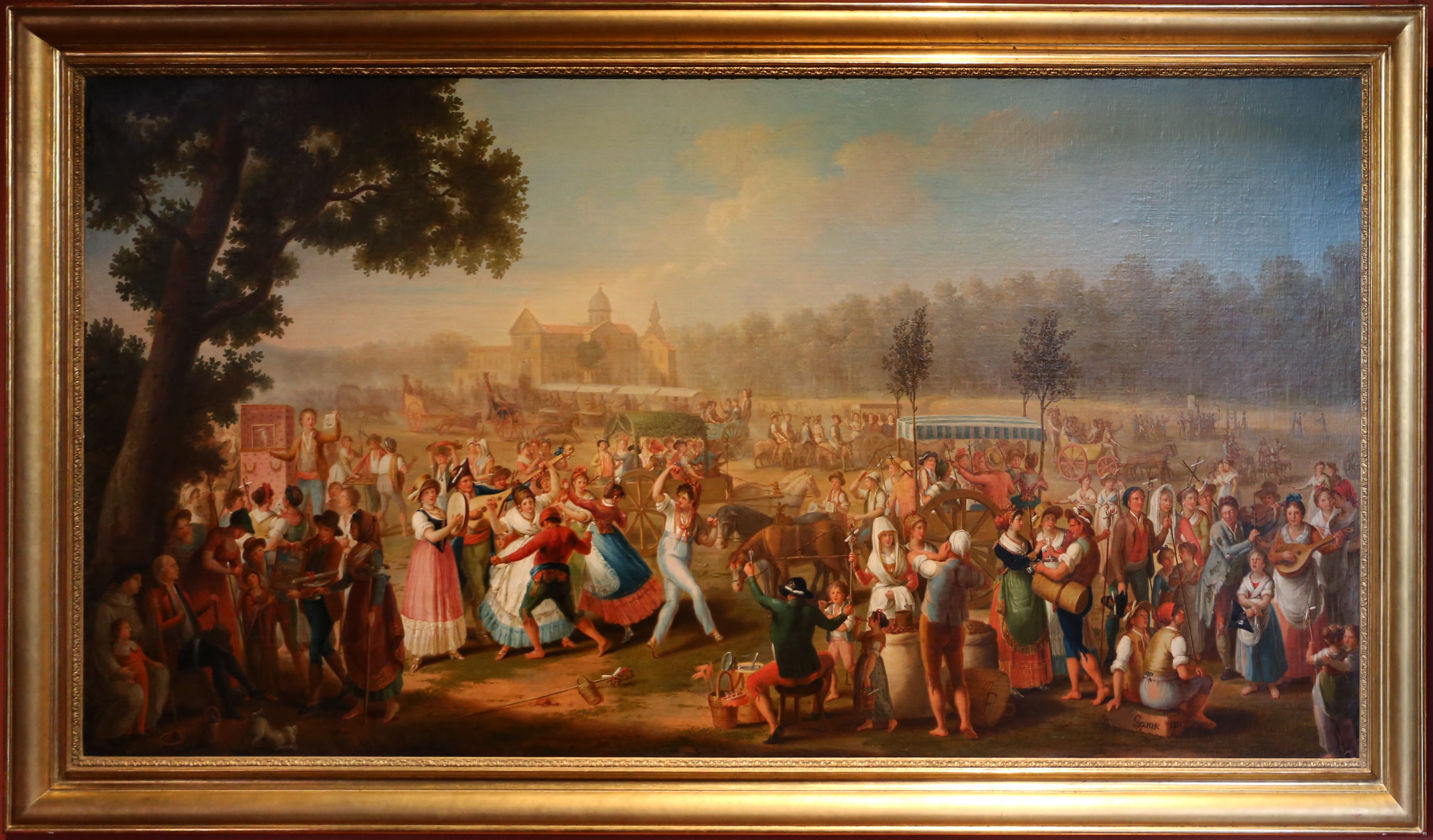
The Feast of the Madonna di Loreto
