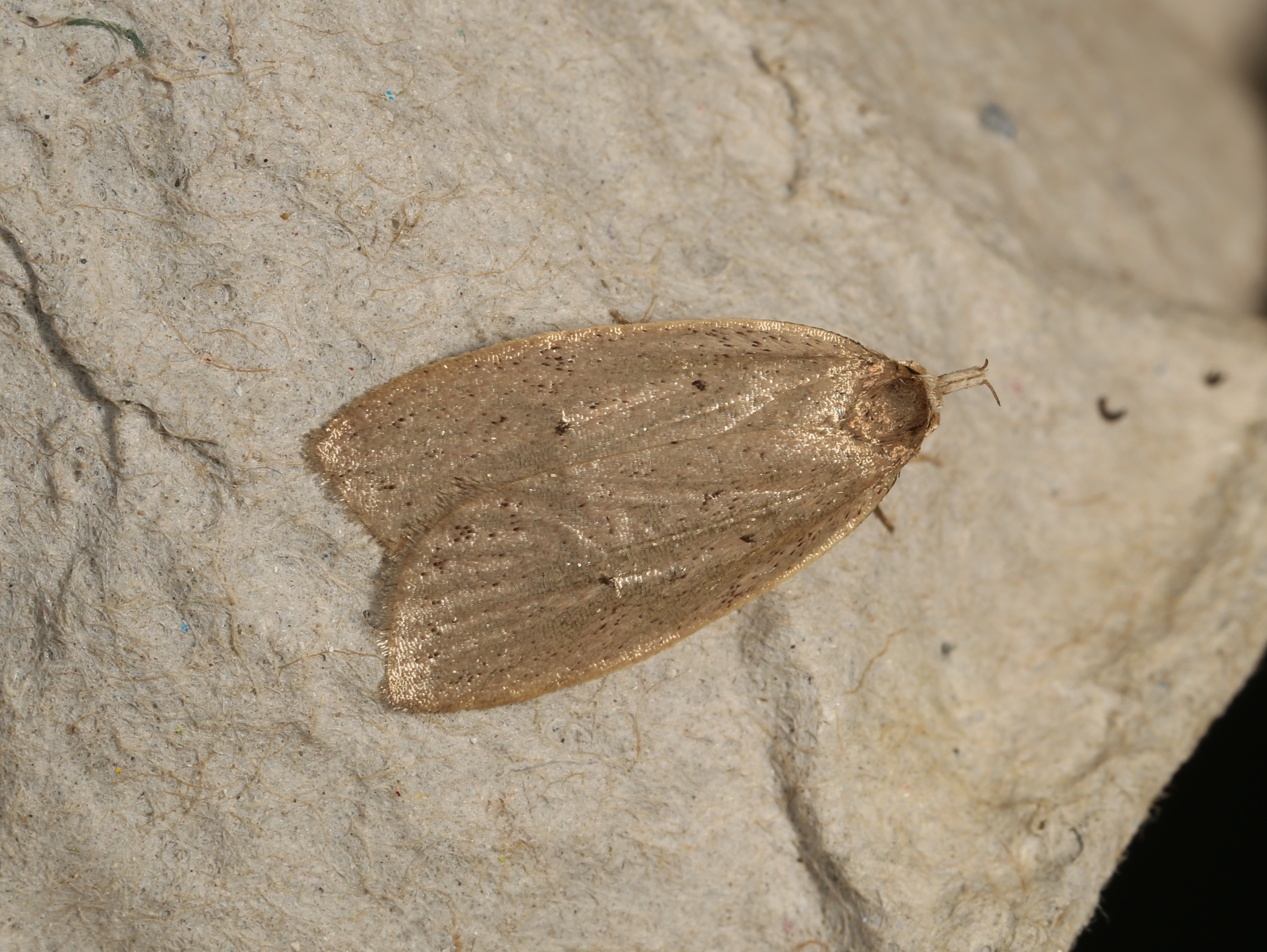

Scientific classification
- Kingdom: Animalia
- Phylum: Arthropoda
- Class: Insecta
- Order: Lepidoptera
- Family: Oecophoridae
- Subfamily: Oecophorinae
- Genus: Chezala; Walker, 1864

Species
- See text.

Synonyms
- Cryptopeges Butler, 1882; Peltophora Meyrick, 1883 (preocc. Burmeister, 1835); Peltophora Meyrick, 1884; Pempeltias Kirkaldy, 1910; Citharodica Meyrick, 1914

= Chezala =

Genus of insects

Chezala is a genus of moths of the family Oecophoridae.

== Species ==
- Chezala aleurias Turner, 1917
- Chezala anaxia Turner, 1941
- Chezala aterpna Turner, 1941
- Chezala brachypepla (Meyrick, 1883)
- Chezala butyrina Turner, 1941
- Chezala carella (Walker, 1864)
- Chezala carphalea (Meyrick, 1884)
- Chezala carphodes Turner, 1941
- Chezala cataxera (Meyrick, 1884)
- Chezala cathara Diakonoff, 1954
- Chezala conjunctella (Walker, 1864)
- Chezala crypsileuca (Meyrick, 1884)
- Chezala erythrastis (Meyrick, 1889)
- Chezala fulvia (Butler, 1882)
- Chezala galactina (Turner, 1916)
- Chezala glaphyropla (Meyrick, 1884)
- Chezala isocycla Meyrick, 1922
- Chezala leparga (Turner, 1917)
- Chezala liopa Turner, 1927
- Chezala liquida (Meyrick, 1914)
- Chezala limitaris Meyrick, 1915
- Chezala lucens Meyrick, 1915
- Chezala lunularis Meyrick, 1926
- Chezala maculata Turner, 1941
- Chezala micranepsia (Turner, 1927)
- Chezala minyra (Meyrick, 1914)
- Chezala ochrobapta Lower, 1920
- Chezala osteochroa (Turner, 1898)
- Chezala privatella (Walker, 1864)
- Chezala silvestris Turner, 1917
- Chezala torva Turner, 1941
