= Jakob Wilhelm Hüber =

German painter

Jakob Wilhelm Hüber (1787– 1871) was a German landscape painter of the 19th century.

He was born in Düsseldorf. While he is described as a faithful pupil of Hackert, Hüber was influential for the painters of the School of Posillipo. He is known for a series of watercolor vedute of Pompeii, painted in 1817 and first published in 1824 by Heinrich Füssli as aquatints, as Vues pittoresques de Pompéi. Raffaelle Carelli, Achille Vianelli, and Giacinto Gigante were among those who he influenced. He died in 1871 in Zurich.
