= Neapolitan ship Vesuvio =

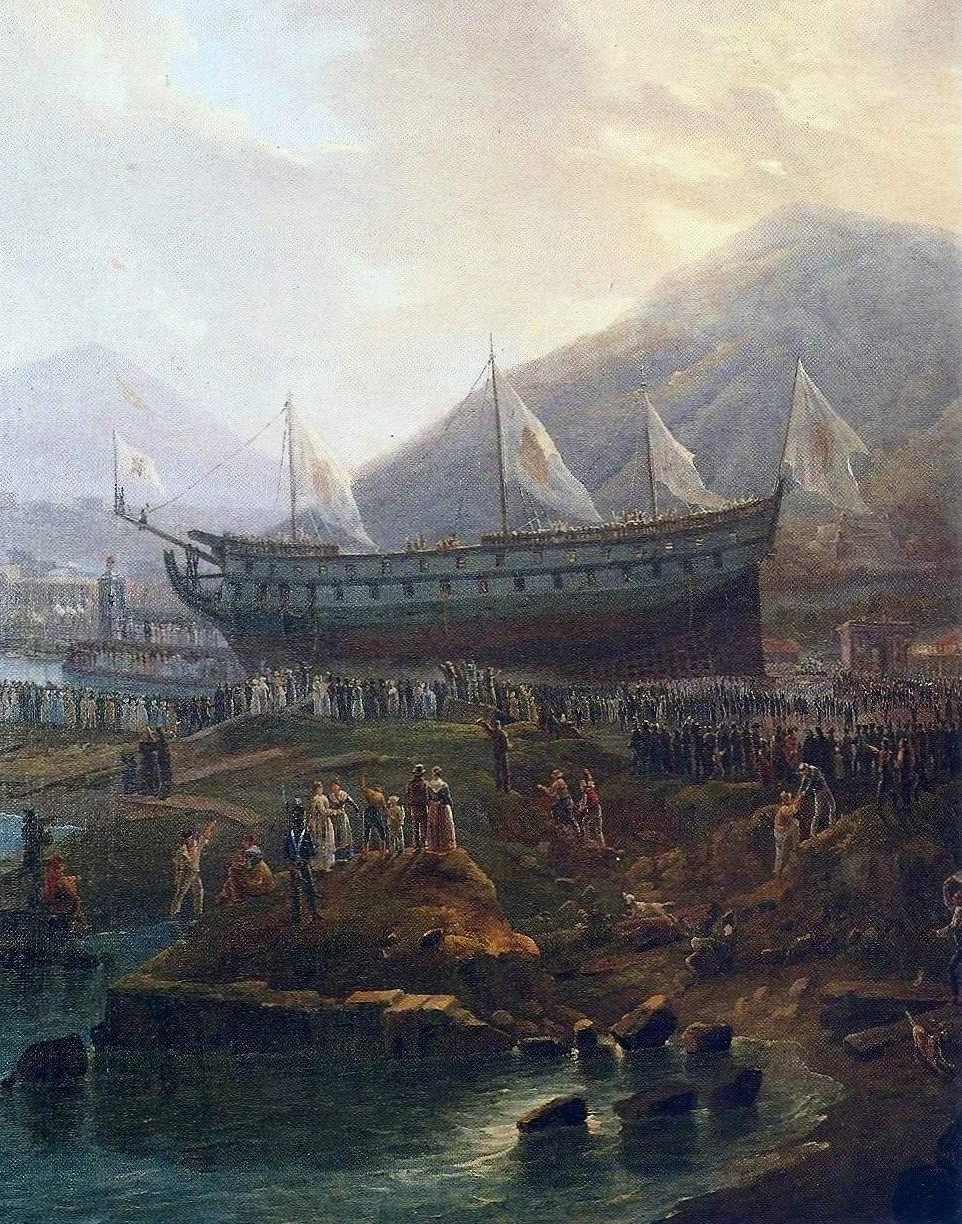
- Vesuvio being launched, by Salvatore Fergola

History

Kingdom of the Two Sicilies
- Name: Vesuvio
- Builder: Castellamare di Stabia
- Laid down: August 1812
- Launched: 2 December 1824
- Acquired: December 1813
- Commissioned: 1825
- Honours and awards: Participated in: Repression of Barbary piracy; Sicilian revolution of 1848
- Fate: Transferred to the Royal Italian Navy

Kingdom of Italy
- Name: Vesuvio
- Acquired: 17 March 1861
- Fate: Broken up in 1865

General characteristics
- Class & type: Bucentaure-class ship of the line
- Displacement: 3,868 tonneaux
- Tons burthen: 2,034 port tonneaux; 2,190 (bm)
- Length: 63.3 m (207 ft 8 in)
- Beam: 15.3 m (50 ft 2 in)
- Draught: 7.8 m (25 ft 7 in)
- Depth of hold: 7.2 m (23 ft 7 in)
- Sail plan: Full-rigged ship
- Armament: Two Sicilies navy: 63 × 24-pounder long guns; 4 × 80-pounder obusiers de vaisseau; 4 × 30-pounder obusiers de vaisseau; 4 × 24-pounder carronades; Royal Italian Navy: 48 × 24-pounder long guns

Vesuvio was a ship of the line of the Real Marina of the Kingdom of the Two Sicilies, later acquired as a frigate by the Italian Royal Navy. She was initially a French Bucentaure class whose construction began in August 1812, but the works stalled and the ship was transferred to the Kingdom of Naples in 1813.

== Construction ==
Built between 1812 and 1825 in Castellammare di Stabia's shipyard for the Royal Navy of the Kingdom of the Two Sicilies, the ship was originally a French ship of the line of the Bucentaure class, ceded to the Kingdom of Naples in December 1813. She was heavily armed with 87 guns on two covered batteries and on the deck, with two batteries covered and one uncovered: 63 smoothbore guns of 24 pounds, 4 smoothbore Paixhans howitzers of 80 pounds, 4 smoothbore howitzers of 30 pounds and 16 24-pounder smoothbore carronades. The hull was built in wood with copper-coated hull, the ship had three masts for square sails. The ship was the first to be launched by Castellamare's shipyard in the presence of the Duke of Calabria and Prince of Salerno, heir of the Kingdom.

== Operational history ==
In September 1825, just a few months after being launched, Vesuvio was sent under the command of Captain Giuseppe De Blasi to Tripoli and Tangiers, where she performed a demonstration against the Barbary pirates in the Mediterranean. The same year the ship transported the new king of the Two Sicilies, Francis I, from Genoa to Naples.

During the next decade, the vessel was used for the transport of troops on the route Naples - Palermo and training trips for officer cadets.

In March 1834, the Vesuvio was taken in the yards of Castellammare and undergone a complete careening and caulking, with the replacement of some plates of copper. The works lasted three months.

On 10 May 1843, 320 members of the crew of the vessel contributed, along with another 2,200 men, to pull in drydock the old vessel Capri. On 1 July 1843 the ship, under the command of Brigadier Raffaele De Cosa and carrying the princess Teresa Cristina of the Two Sicilies, wife of Emperor Pedro II of Brazil, left Naples for Rio de Janeiro together with the frigate Amalia, Ship of the line Partenope, the Queen Isabella Frigate and a Brazilian Naval Division commanded by Admiral Di Teodoro Beaurepaire. After crossing the equator in the night between 17 and 18 August in rough seas conditions, the ships arrived to the Brazilian city on the evening of 3 September. She remained at Rio for almost a month and a half to attend celebrations in honor of Teresa Cristina and stocking up on food and water. The squadron sailed out again later on 15 October for Naples, where they arrived on the evening of 24 December 1843, after 140 days of navigation. It was the first crossing of the South Atlantic by a convoy in which observations on the climate of the torrid zone were made.

In October 1844, having identified a flaw in Vesuvio´s bow, the vessel, instead of being torn down for repairs as usual (as was done in 1834), was put in drydock at the shipyard of Castellammare.

On 28 July 1845, escorted by a naval formation (frigates Queen Isabella, Amalia and Partenope, corvette Cristina, aviso Delfino), she carried to Palermo the King of Naples, the counts of Caserta and Trapani and their entourage.

In January 1848 Vesuvio, under the command of Captain Giorgio Miloro, shelled Palermo during the suppression of the Sicilian uprising.

On 14 August 1852 the ship, whose commander was then the Captain Louis Chrétien, was the first naval unit to be brought into the new drydock of the Arsenal of Naples for refitting. Her armament was slightly reduced to 81 guns.

The ship, now old and worn, had no role in the events that led to the fall of the Kingdom of the Two Sicilies and the Unification of Italy. After the capture of Naples, on 7 September 1860, Vesuvio was laid up in the city docks, and despite being formally incorporated into the new Royal Italian Navy on 17 March 1861 (now reclassified as a corvette and with her armament reduced to 48 guns of 80 pounds), it was decided that the conditions in which the aging vessel was found discouraged the idea of her recommissioning. The Vesuvio was eventually written off in 1861 and on 9 June of that year towed to Pozzuoli by the paddle steamer Tancredi.

After being sold at a public auction, Vesuvio was broken up on 3 January 1865.
