= Vincenzo Franceschini =

Italian painter (1812–1885)

- Born: 1812; Casandrino, near Naples, Kingdom of Naples (present-day Italian Republic)
- Died: 1884 (aged 71–72); Casandrino, Kingdom of Italy
- Known for: Painting, Landscape painting
- Movement: Verismo

Vincenzo Franceschini (1812–1885) was an Italian painter, mainly depicting landscapes with ruins and the views around Naples. He was born and died in Casandrino. He trained with Anton Sminck van Pitloo, and formed part of the School of Posillipo.
