= Anton Josef Dräger =

German painter

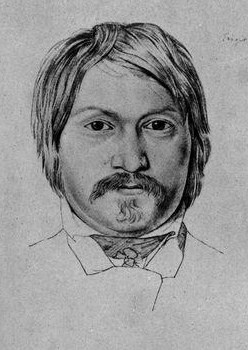
Portrait of Anton Josef Dräger

Anton Josef Dräger, also known as Joseph Anton Draeger (1794–1833), was a German historical painter.

== Biography ==
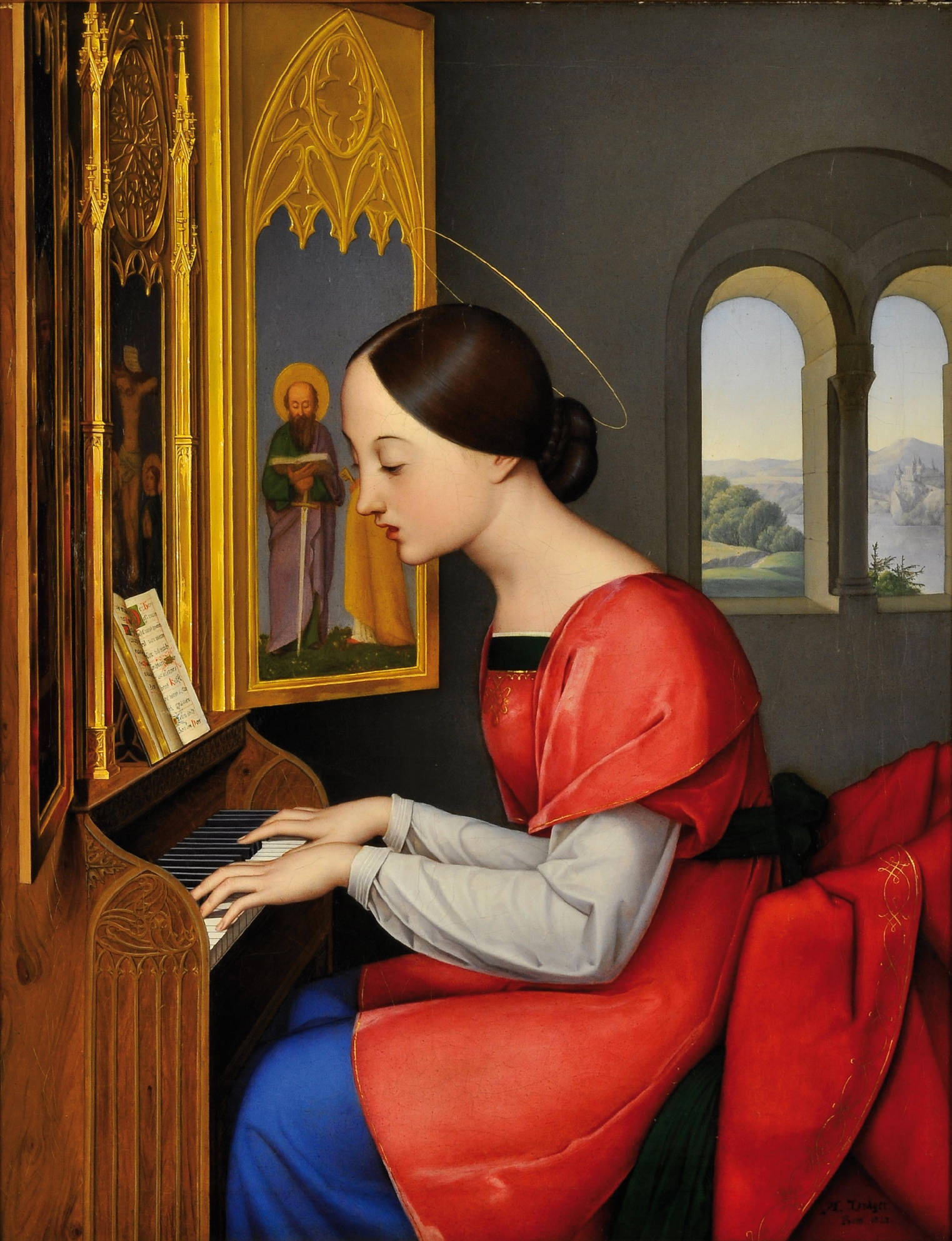
St Cecilia

He was born in Trèves. He studied under Kugelgen in Dresden, but went in 1823 to Italy and took up his quarters in Rome, where he followed, as a nondescript in life and art, his own peculiar style of colouring. In his desire to attain the charm of the colours of the great Venetians, a very faded picture of that school led him to the conviction that they painted their pictures entirely in grey before putting on the bright colours. Working in this way he obtained an extraordinary clearness of colour, a good example of which is seen in his Moses protecting the Daughters of Jethro, in the Berlin Gallery. Dräger died in Rome.

== See also ==
- List of German painters
