= Anthony Carelli =

American poet

- Education: University of Wisconsin–Madison; New York University
- Writing career
- Genre: Poetry
- Notable awards: Whiting Award

Anthony Carelli is an American poet. He won a Whiting Award.

== Life ==
He grew up in Poynette, Wisconsin. He graduated from University of Wisconsin–Madison, and from New York University. He teaches at New York University. He works in Brooklyn. His work appeared in AGNI, and The New Yorker.

== Works ==
- Carnations: Poems: Poems. Princeton University Press. 14 March 2011. pp. 5–. ISBN 978-1-4008-3824-0.
