= Chezala carella =

Scientific classification
- Kingdom: Animalia
- Phylum: Arthropoda
- Class: Insecta
- Order: Lepidoptera
- Family: Oecophoridae
- Genus: Chezala
- Species: C. carella

Binomial name
- Chezala carella (Walker, 1864)

Synonyms
- Oecophora carella Walker, 1864; Machimia carella; Elaeonoma aleuritis Turner, 1935

Species of moth

Chezala carella is a moth in the family Oecophoridae. It was described by Francis Walker in 1864. It is found in Australia, where it has been recorded from Queensland.

The wingspan is 16–24 mm for males and 25–30 mm for females. The forewings are ochreous-grey whitish. The hindwings are pale grey.
