= Gigantes de Carolina =

Gigantes de Carolina may refer to:

- Gigantes de Carolina (baseball), a baseball team in the Puerto Rico Baseball League
- Gigantes de Carolina (men's basketball), a men's basketball team in the Baloncesto Superior Nacional
- Gigantes de Carolina (women's basketball), a women's basketball team in the Baloncesto Superior Nacional Femenino
- Gigantes de Carolina FC, an association football team in the Puerto Rico Soccer League
- Gigantes de Carolina (men's volleyball), a men's volleyball team in the Liga de Voleibol Superior Masculino
- Gigantes de Carolina (women's volleyball), a women's volleyball team in the Liga de Voleibol Superior Femenino
