= Raffaele Carelli =

Italian painter

Raffaele Carelli (25 September 1795 in Martina Franca - 1864 in Naples, Italy) was an Italian painter and painter of the School of Posillipo.

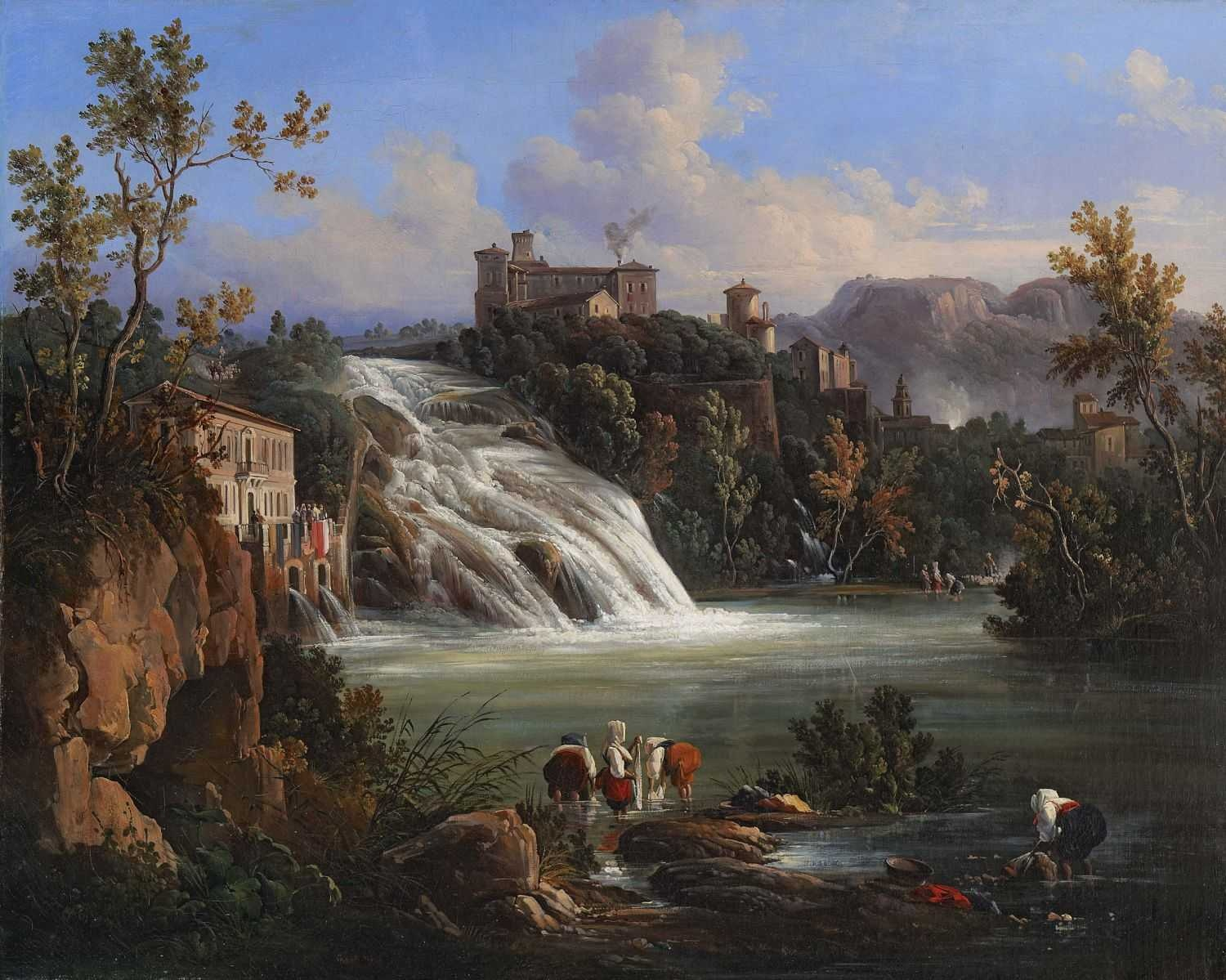
Isola del Liri, Cascata del Valcatoio

Raffaele's father, Settimio Carelli, was a painter in Apulia, where he had been a follower of the style of Pompeo Battoni. Raffaele as a young man sought employment in Naples, and initially worked with a painting restorer, but soon worked in the studio with Wilhelm Jakob Huber. In 1833, he won a prize for landscape art from the Neapolitan Academy for two vistas of Cascade of Fibreno and the Scoglio di Frisa. He was best known for his landscape paintings, sometimes commingling with genre scenes. As a documentary painter, completing water colors of various sights, he accompanied the 6th Duke of Devonshire in some tours of Sicily, Greece, Asia Minor, and Constantinople. He was the father of the painters Consalvo (Gonsalvo) and Gabriele Carelli. He is the grandfather of the painters Giuseppe Carelli (1858 - 1921), son of Conzalvo, and Conrad Hector Raffaele Carelli (1866–1956), son of Gabriele.
