= Consalvo Carelli =

Italian landscape painter (1818–1900)

Consalvo Carelli (29 March 1818 in Naples – 2 December 1900 in Naples, Italy) was an Italian landscape painter and painter of the School of Posillipo. He is also known as Gonsalvo Carelli.

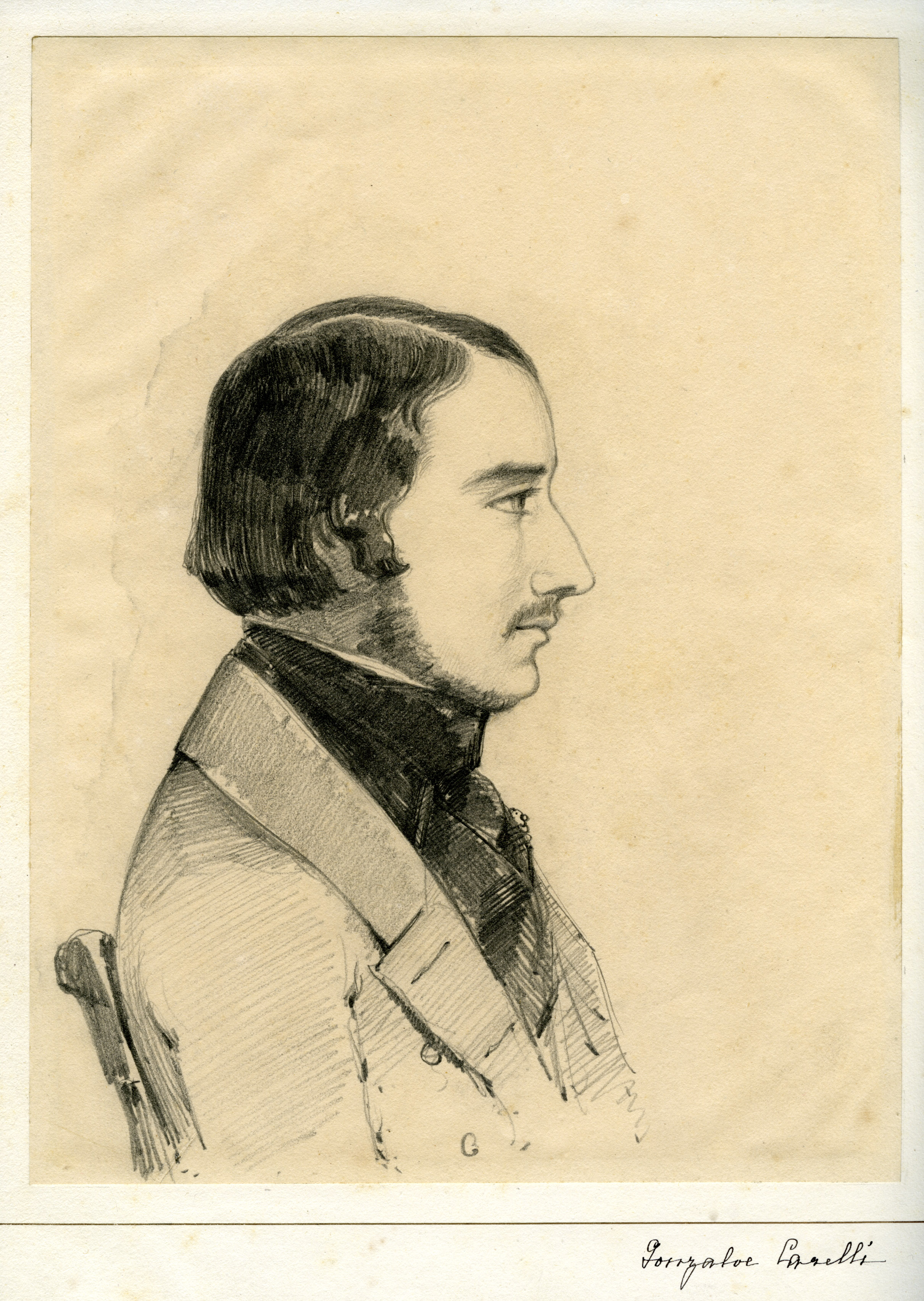
Portrait of Consalvo Carelli

== Biography ==
Consalvo's father, Raffaelle Carelli, was an early member of the School of Posillipo and who had migrated to Naples from Apulia. In 1837, he was given a scholarship to travel to Rome, where he attached himself to the French Academy in Rome. He returned to Naples in 1840, but lived for three years in Paris (1841–1843), where he gained recognition as a landscape painter. He helped illustrate a travel journal of Alexandre Dumas. He had patronage from French, English, and Russian aristocracy. He was the brother of the painter Gabriele Carelli. He was the father of the painter Giuseppe Carelli (1858 - 1921), and uncle of Conrad Hector Raffaele Carelli (1866–1956), son of Gabriele. One of his pupils was Egidio De Maulo.

A painting by Carelli, stolen in Italy in 2001, was returned to that country by the United States government in 2016.
