= Antonie Sminck Pitloo =

Dutch painter

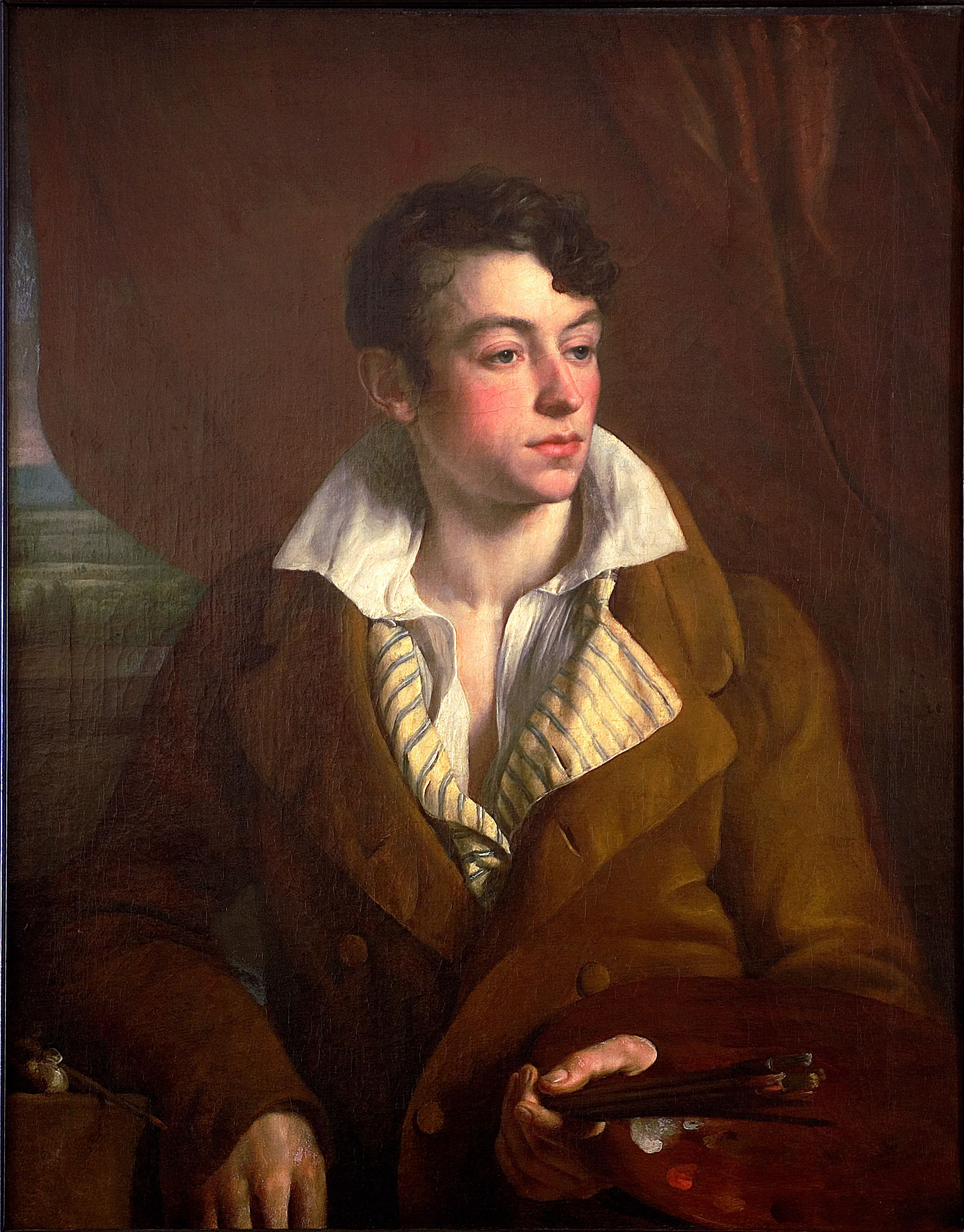
Anton Sminck van Pitloo; portrait by Pieter van Hanselaere (c.1814)

Antonie or Anton Sminck Pitloo (21 April or 8 May 1790 – 22 June 1837) was a Dutch painter. His surname was originally Pitlo, but he added the extra "o" because he was often mistaken for an Italian while resident in Italy. In Italian he is also known as Antonio van Pitloo.

== Biography ==
Pitloo was born in Arnhem. He started studying painting first at Paris and then at Rome, where there was already an international artistic colony, in 1811. He took advantage of a scholarship offered by Louis Bonaparte, the King of Holland. In 1815, after the fall of Bonaparte, the scholarship payments ceased. He was then invited to Naples by the Russian diplomat and art connoisseur Count Grigory Vladimirovich Orloff (1777 – 22 June 1826). In 1816, Pitloo won, in a public competition, the post of professor of landscape at the Neapolitan Academy. Lord Napier lauded him as a landscape painter:

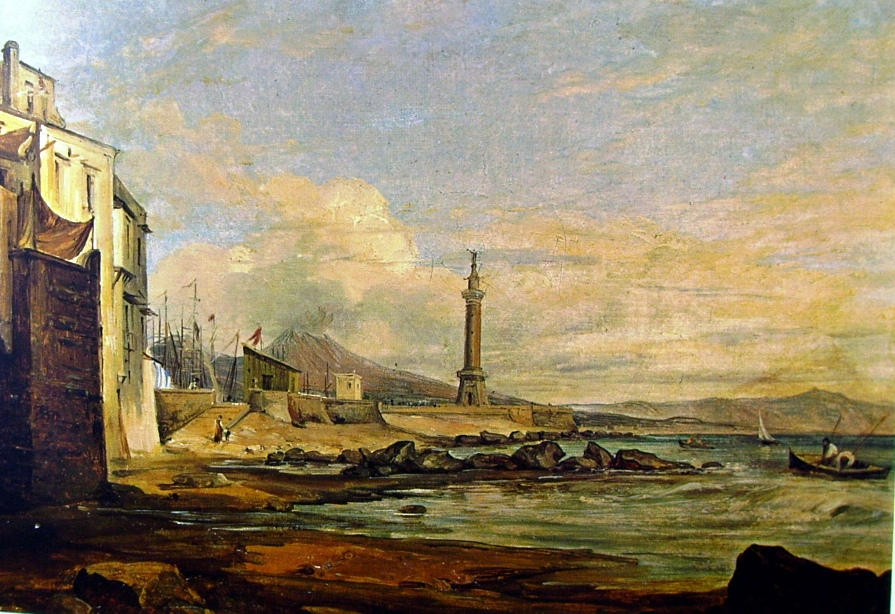
La Lanterna del Molo (date unknown)

his manner is not very careful or scholastic, but full of sensibility. His pencil is always true to general effects, whether his canvass represents the prospect basking in the mid-day brightness of the Italian sky, or the waves flashing in the train of the level sun, or the fields refreshed and steaming in the dawn; every color finds its counterpart on his palette, and no aerial magic is so evanescent as to elude his subtle imitation: although not so perfect in the delineation of particular objects, he could touch the different kinds of foliage with sufficient exactness; his foregrounds were managed with taste; and his figures, being prudently removed to some distance from the eye, formed an agreeable adjunct to the inanimate scene.

In 1820 he married Giulia Mori and thus became a citizen of the Kingdom of the Two Sicilies. He became a lecturer at the Art Institute of Art at Naples where he specialized in pastoral painting.

Around 1826 he was living in Vicoletto del Vasto 15, with Carl Götzloff, Giacinto Gigante and Teodoro Duclere. Gabriele Smargiassi was his pupil and successor at the academy. Another pupil was Vincenzo Franceschini.

He remained in Naples until his death during a cholera epidemic. He was buried in the English Cemetery there.

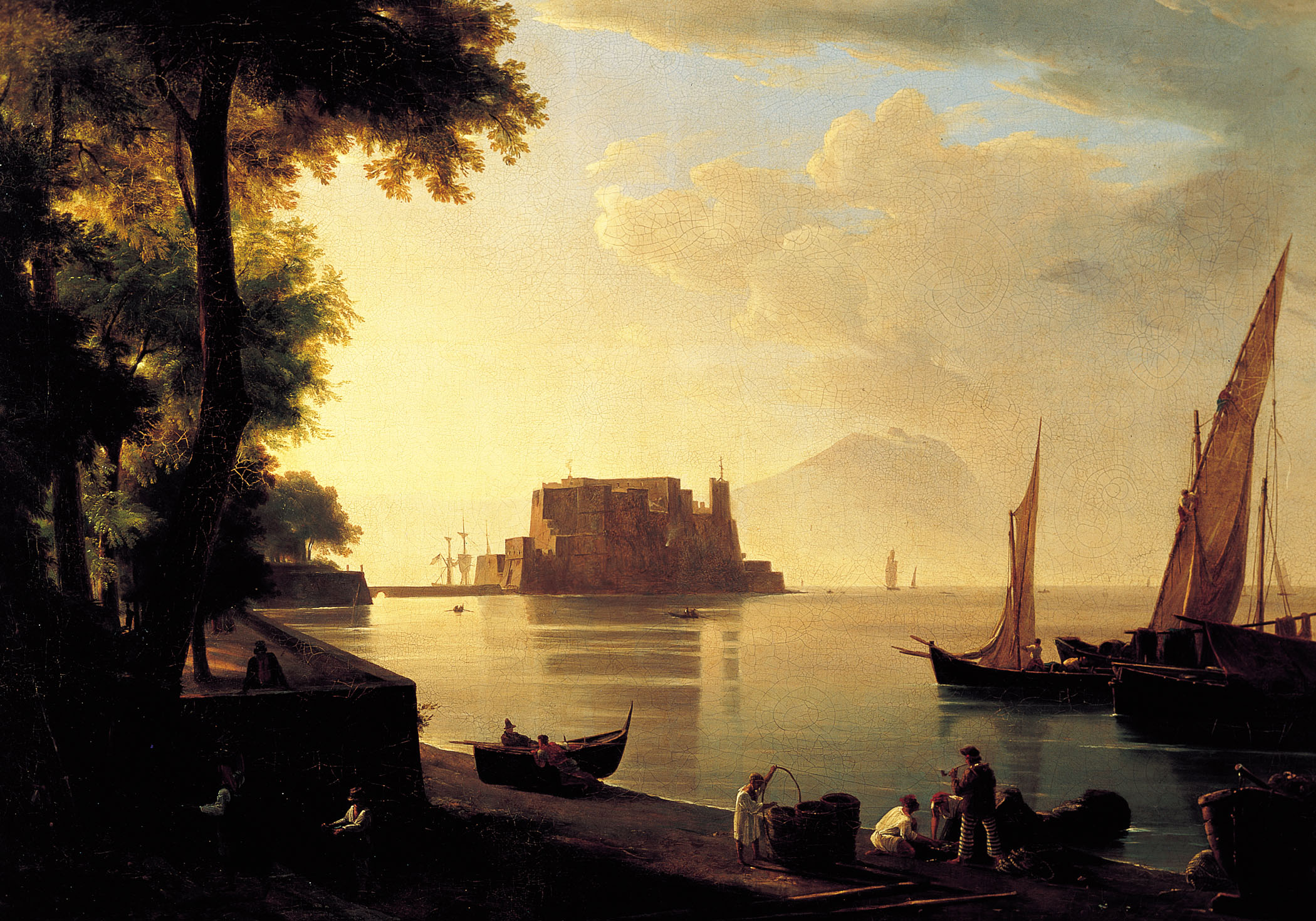
Castel dell'Ovo, Naples. c.1820

He was considered a leading exponent of the "Posillipo School" of painting, named to the area where he lived in Naples. His paintings have been compared to precursors of Impressionism, some sixty years before this was invented.
