= School of Posillipo =

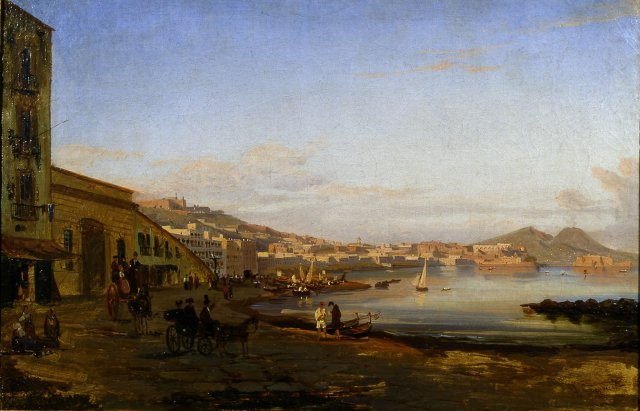
Giacinto Gigante, The port at Posillipo, 1844

The School of Posillipo refers to a loose group of landscape painters, many based in the waterfront Posillipo neighbourhood of Naples, Italy, during the Romantic era. They worked largely for wealthy foreign travellers or tourists. While some among them became academicians, it was not a formal school or association.

In the 18th century, landscape painting or vedute had emerged as a profitable, and respectable, style of painting. Landscapes were, in part, in higher demand than depictions of Catholic religious imagery to Grand Tour buyers from Protestant Europe during the Age of the Enlightenment. This included the mainly aristocratic travellers on a grand tour of Southern Europe. Items in demand by travellers were paintings evoking memories of the place, playing the role that photographic postcards now fill. Pietro Fabris, for example, had created views of Pompeii and the Volcanic fields surrounding Vesuvius and Etna. In Venice, Canaletto and the Guardi for example, had depicted mainly urban vistas of the waterlogged city. Vanvitelli, Panini, and Belloto adapted these styles to different urbanscapes in Italy and abroad. Their styles were realistic, and Canaletto was said to use a camera obscura.

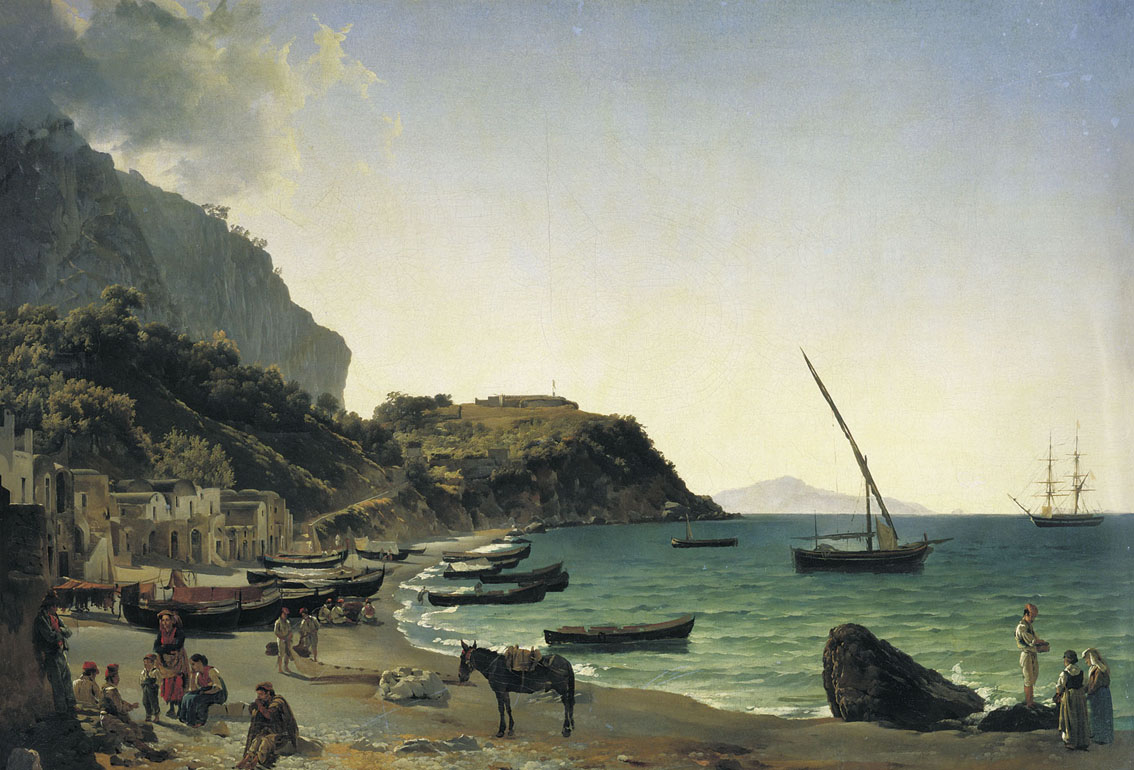
Sylvester Shchedrin, Marina Grande, Capri, 1828

Such detailed realism, however, was rarely applied to natural scenery. There was a tradition in Italy of landscape painting dating to the Baroque 17th century with Claude Lorrain in Rome and Salvatore Rosa in Rome and Naples as two distinct trends. Lorrain's landscapes were lush and imagined, and still often theoretically history paintings, with small figures from biblical or classical stories, dwarfed by the large landscape. Rosa painted tempestuous arrangements of natural elements, at close range, such as a craggy hillock with perilously perched trees.

At the start of the 19th century in Naples, the premier representative of landscape painters was the Dutch emigree Jacob Philipp Hackert (1737–1807), the court painter of Ferdinand IV of Naples, who seem to be following the tradition of Lorrain. His paintings had a stock arrangement of a nearby tree in a pastoral hill or mountainside, and with distant ruins or a recognizable mountain in the background. Volcano-ridden southern Campania and Sicily had such distinctive peaks. The fortunes of Hackert suffered with the rise of the Napoleonic Neoclassicism and the conquest of the Bourbon Kingdom of the Two Sicilies by the French.

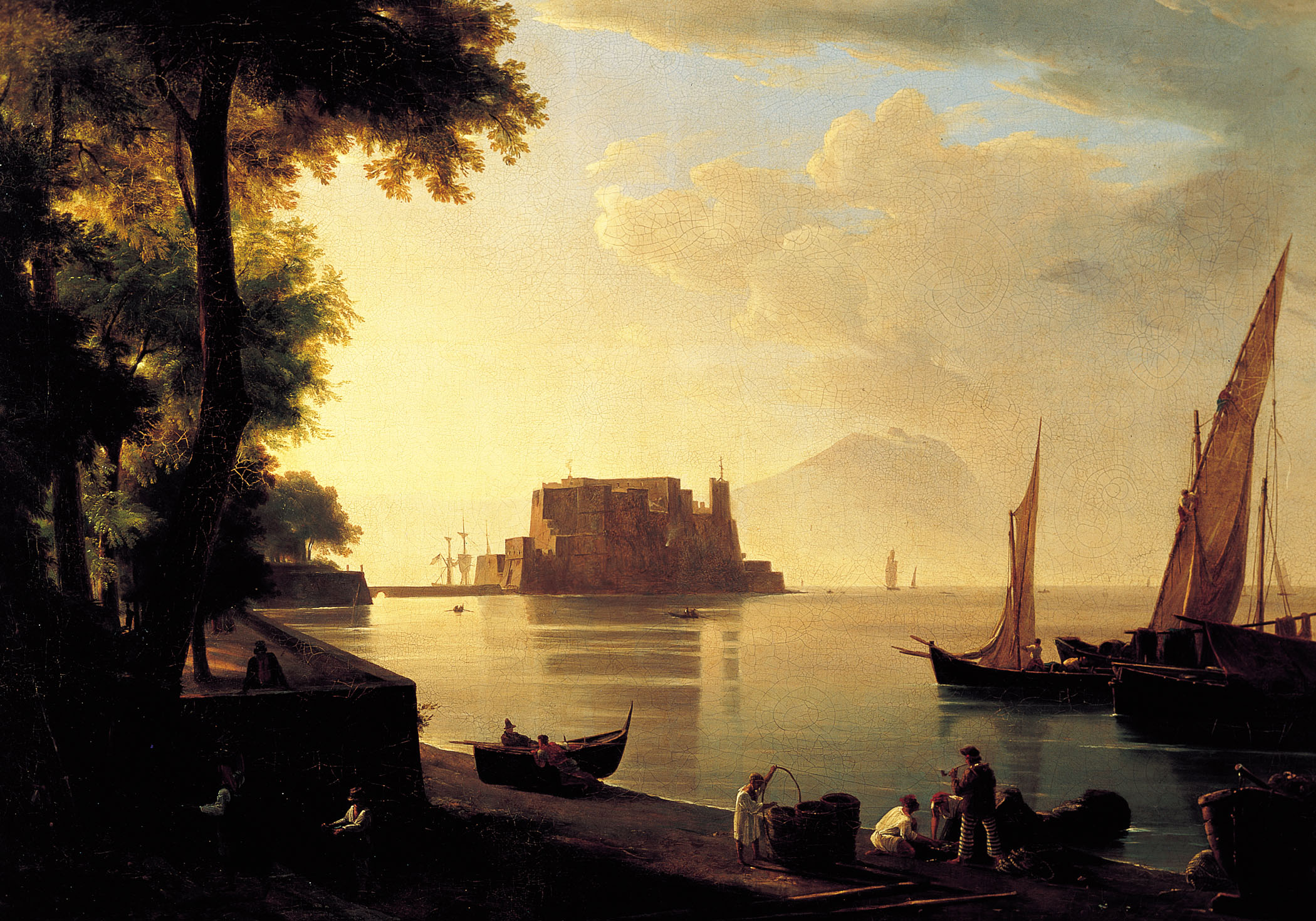
Pitloo, Castel dell'Ovo, Naples. c.1820

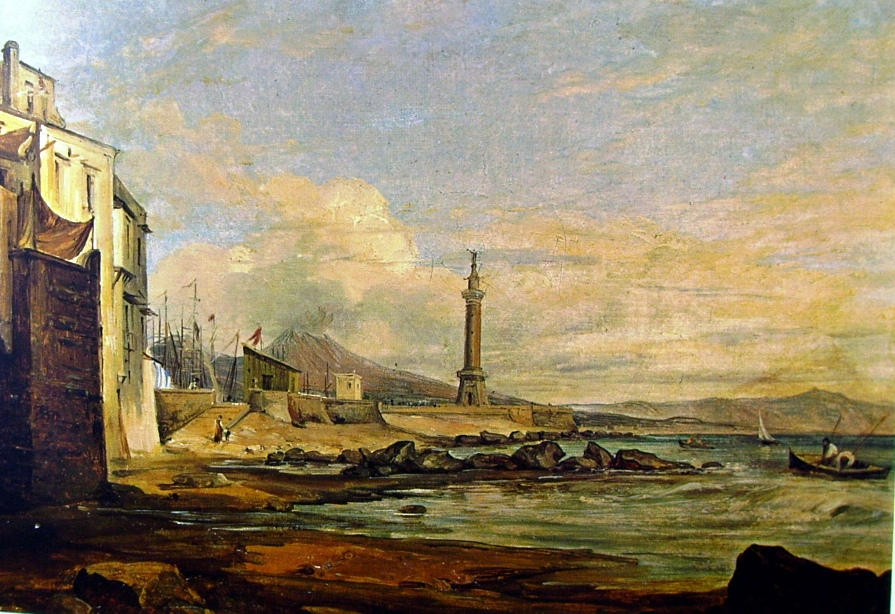
Pitloo, La Lanterna del Molo

Gigante, View of Docks

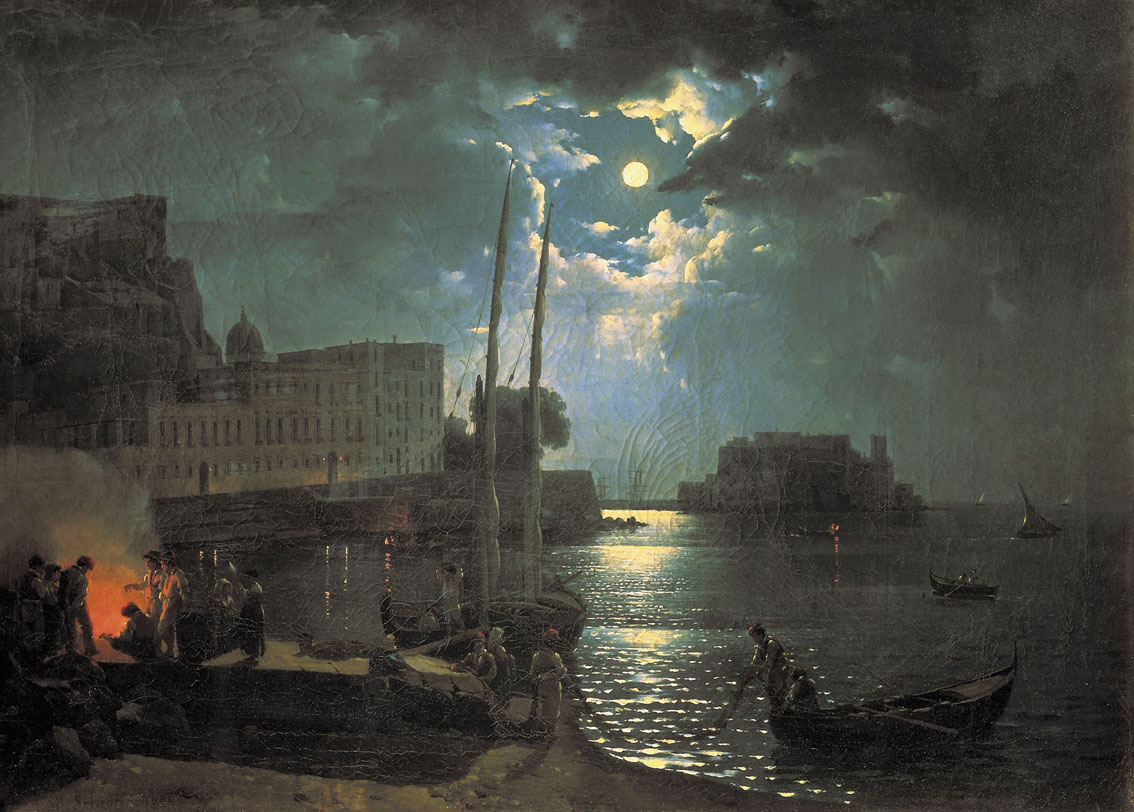
Schedrin, Moon Night in Naples, 1828

In 1815, the painter Anton Sminck Pitloo (1790–1837) was coaxed to move to Naples. He opened a studio in the Chiaia neighbourhood. He preferred to paint outdoors with natural lighting. Posillipo, at one end of the crescent shape bay of Naples, was a natural spot that allowed the painters to paint both buildings and water. Some say he was influenced by the visits of Turner (1819–1820) and Corot to Naples, but in general, Pitloo's paintings are devoid of passionate political or social imagery Pitloo favoured views of the curving Neapolitan shore from his vantage point on the peninsula of Posillipo. In this way his vista included water, the bustling shoreline and docks, and the land across the bay. There was also the daily activities of sailors, fisherman, and their families.

Like Hackert before him, Pitloo became a professor at the Accademia di Belli Arti in Naples, and was able to influence fellow painters and pupils such as Carl Götzloff, Giacinto Gigante, Teodoro Duclere, Gabriele Smargiassi, Vincenzo Franceschini, Achille Vianelli, Raffaele Carelli and his son Consalvo Carelli. Many of the works of these painters from circa 1820 to circa 1850 are known as products of the School of Posillipo. Other painters influence by this school are Salvatore Fergola, a pupil of Hackert. In time, the lessening of the demands for accuracy and a greater attention to the mood of the painting during the age of Romanticism, led to more impressionist styles found in the post-1850s Tuscan school of Macchiaioli (who also painted out of doors), or in the School of Resina represented by painters such as Guglielmo Ciardi.

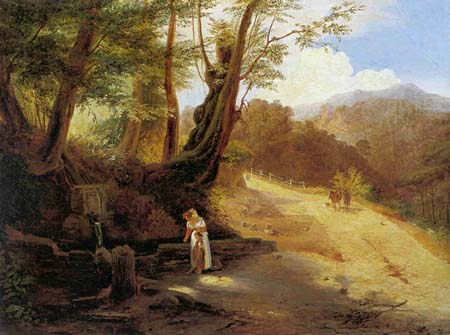
Smargiassi, Fontana di Genzano, 1826

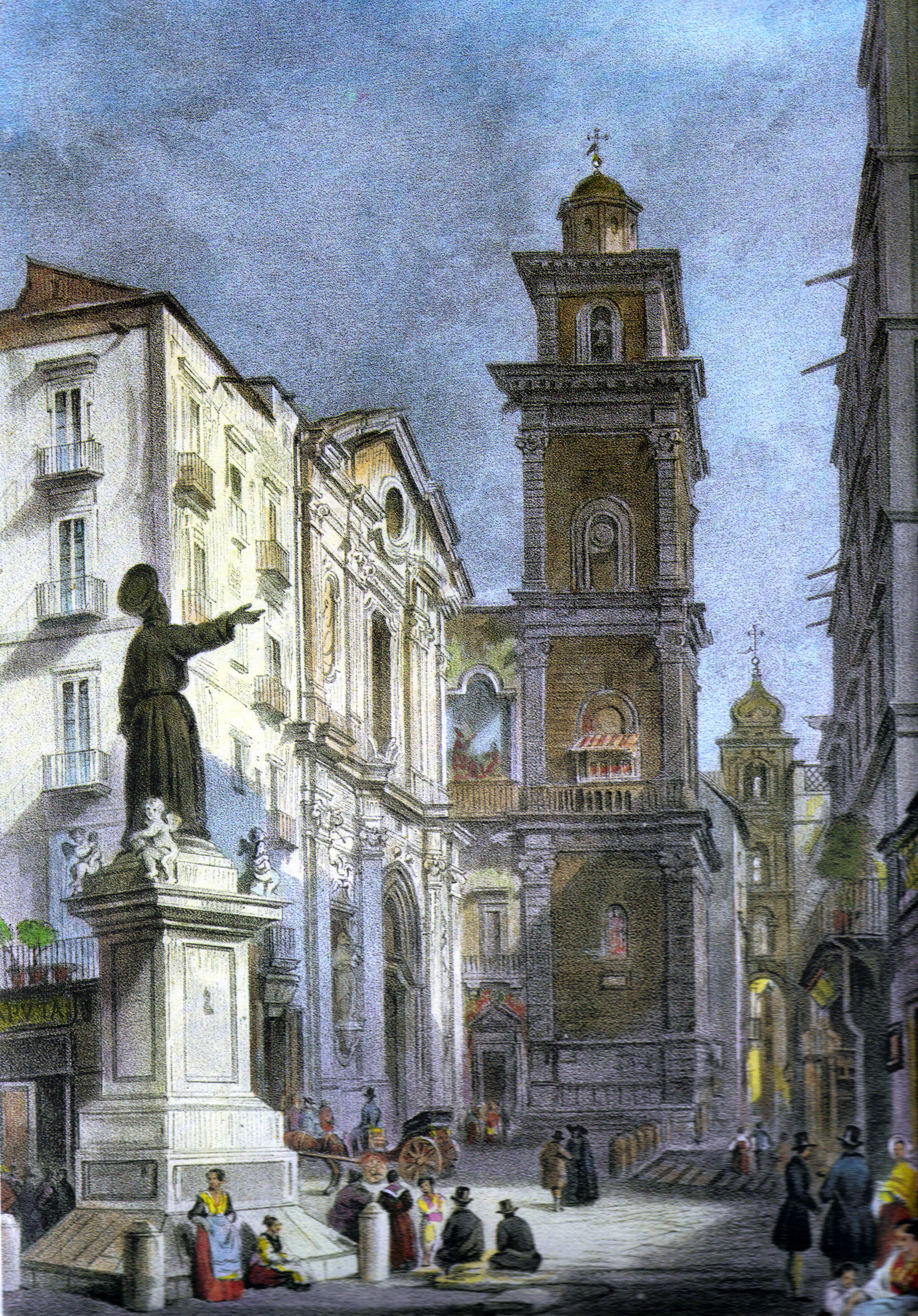
Vianelli, Piazza di San Lorenzo Maggiore, 1826

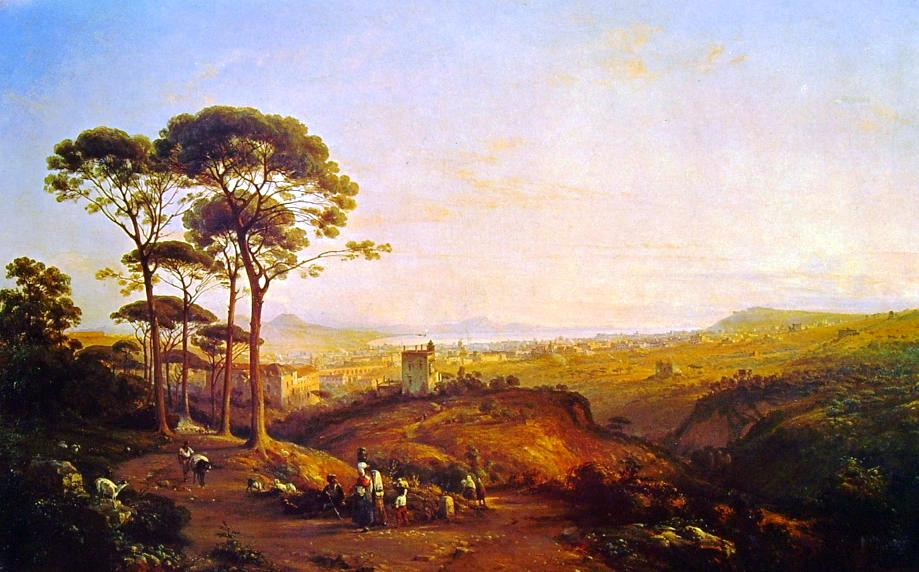
Duclere, Napoli dalla Conocchia, 1838

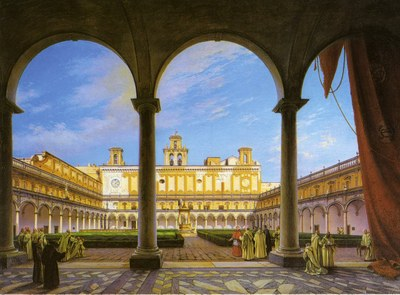
Gabriele Carelli, Chiostro di San Martino, 1850

View of the Gulf of Naples, Giacinto Gigante

The most prominent of Pitloo's students was Giacinto Gigante (1806–1876), who started his career working for the Neapolitan Royal Topographic Office. Gigante had observed the use of a camara lucida in the studio of Swiss-German artist, Jakob Wilhelm Hüber (1787–1871), who used camara lucida. He also worked with watercolors. He collaborated with Cuciniello and Bianchi in landscapes collected in a book titled Viaggio pittorico nel Regno delle Due Sicilie (Pictorial journey through the Kingdom of the Two Sicilies). Gigante befriended Sylvester Shchedrin, and through him also obtained commissions from the Russian aristocracy. Like Pitloo before him, Gigante he was appointed chief of design at the Neapolitan Academy. Giuseppe and Filippo Palizzi (1818–1899) were briefly pupils of Gigante, but soon fell under the influence of the Barbizon School, who in turn were to influence Domenico Morelli

In the mid-19th century two cousins, the son and nephew of Consalvo Carelli followed their customers home and settled in England, where they had successful careers, including working for the royal family. They largely painted in watercolour.
