= Giacinto Gigante =

19th-century Neapolitan landscape painter

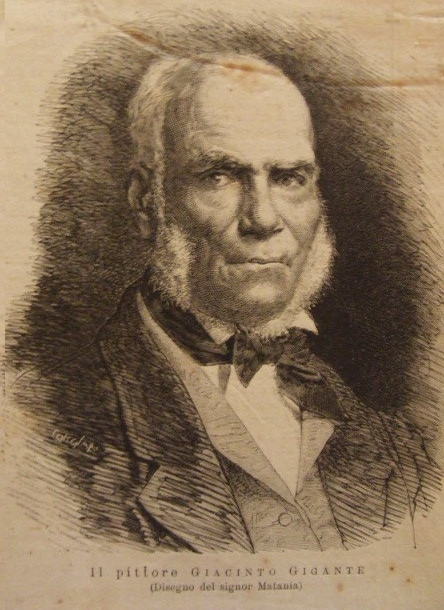
- Born: July 11, 1806; Naples, Italy
- Died: September 29, 1876 (aged 70)
- Known for: Painting

Giacinto Gigante (1806–1876) was an Italian painter, engraver, and teacher. He was known for his landscape and vista paintings, exemplary works of the Neapolitan School of Posillipo.

== Biography ==
=== Early life ===
Giacinto Gigante was born on July 11, 1806, in Posillipo, Naples. He was the first son of Gaetano Gigante and Anna Maria Fatati.

Encouraged by his father, who was also a painter, Gigante began his artistic education in 1818 and began producing landscapes and portraits. Among his early works is Vecchio pescatore seduto which, next to the signature, is inscribed: "This sailor was the first figure that I made from life, in 1818."

In 1820, together with the painter Achille Vianelli, Gigante began to privately frequent the atelier of Jacob Wilhelm Hüber, an academic German landscape painter. Hüber taught his students the use of the "optical camera" or "camera lucida": with this instrument, Gigante could retrace the outline of a landscape on paper as a preliminary study.

=== Pitloo apprenticeship ===
Having left Hüber, Gigante completed his course of study in 1821 under the guidance of Antonie Sminck Pitloo, a Dutch painter with an atelier in the neighborhood of Chiaia. Around 1826 he was living in Naples in Vicoletto del Vasto 15, with Van Pitloo, Carl Götzloff and Teodoro Duclère (Duclerc). He was related by marriage to Achille Vianelli.

=== Later life ===
In 1837, Pitloo having died during a cholera epidemic, Gigante solidified his social standing as the primary exponent of the School of Posillipo. In the same year, he even went to live in the house of the master in Chiaia. In 1844, thanks to the proceeds of various Russian commissions, he was able to buy a personal mansion on the slopes of Vomero.

After several trips to Sicily (in 1846, following the czarina Alessandra) and Sorrento (in 1848), Gigante came into contact with Bourbon social circles. He was received commissions of Gaeta vistas from the court of Ferdinand II of Naples.

Gigante died in Naples on November 29, 1876.

== Artistic style ==
View of the Docks (date unknown)

Gigante was introduced to painting by his father Gaetano Gigante. His brothers Achille Gigante (1823–1846) and Ercole Gigante (1815–1860) also became landscape artists. He trained in the style of Jacob Philipp Hackert and was influenced by the technical drawing carried out at the Royal Institute of Fine Arts.

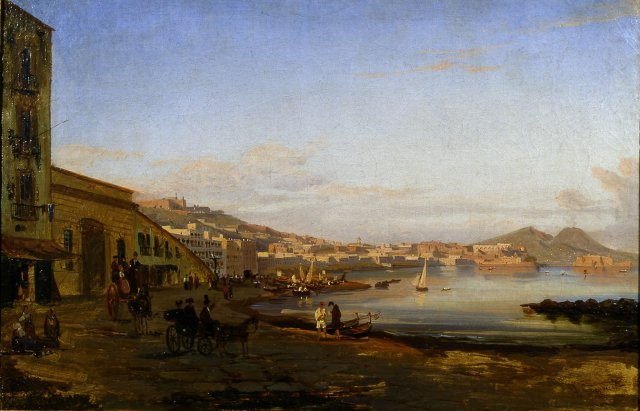
Marina di Posillipo, 1844

Along with Achille Vianelli he was to be strongly influenced by a large colony of foreign painters then present in Naples including Huber and Pitloo. From Jakob Wilhelm Hüber, Gigante learnt watercolour technique and the use of the panoramic ‘camera lucida’ method. Via Huber he met the Dutch artist Anton Sminck van Pitloo, who became his teacher for a few years. In 1823, Gigante won the Naples Royal Institute of Fine Arts drawing competition. In 1826, he displayed four works at the first Esposizione di Belle Arti. Reportedly though, Gigante did not fit in well with the life of the Naples Royal Institute of Fine Arts, and left.

He is one of the original members of the 19th-century Neapolitan "Posillipo School" of painting, named for the area where he lived in Naples.

== Bibliography ==
- Limoncelli, M. (1934). Giacinto Gigante (in Italian). Naples.
- Ortolani, Sergio (2009). Giacinto Gigante e la pittura di paesaggio a Napoli e in Italia dal '600 all'800 (in Italian) (1. ed.). Sorrento (Napoli): F. Di Mauro. ISBN 978-88-87365-77-1.
- Valente, Isabella (2019). La scuola di Posillipo. La luce che conquistò il mondo (in Italian). Naples: Mediterranea Edizioni. ISBN 978-88-94260-51-9.
