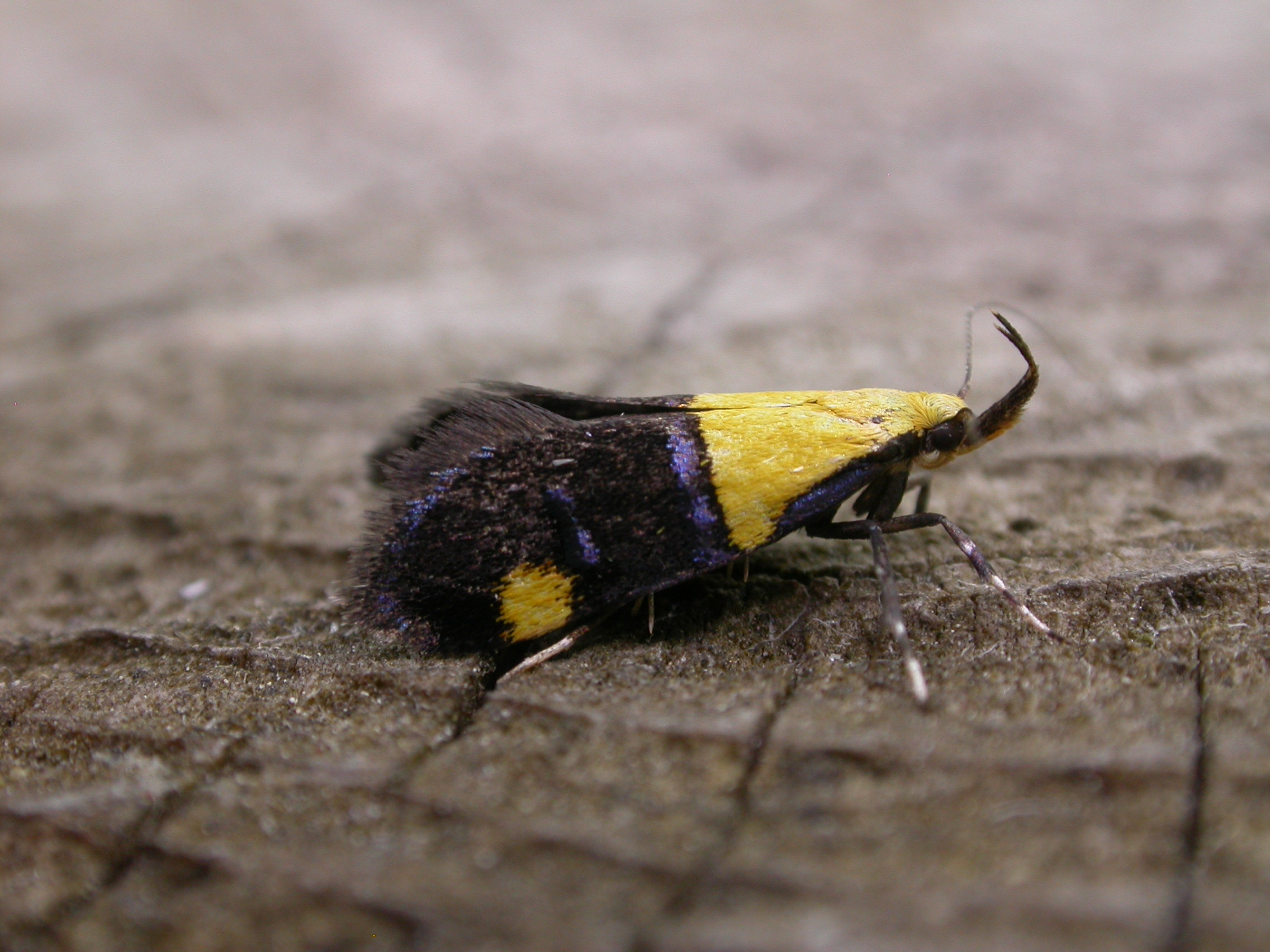
- Adult Oecophora bractella in Hellerup, Denmark

Scientific classification
- Kingdom: Animalia
- Phylum: Arthropoda
- Clade: Pancrustacea
- Class: Insecta
- Order: Lepidoptera
- Family: Oecophoridae
- Tribe: Oecophorini
- Genus: Oecophora; Latreille, 1796

Type species
- Tinea sulphurella Fabricius, 1777 (non Fabricius, 1775: preoccupied)

= Oecophora =

Genus of moths

Oecophora is a genus of the concealer moth family (Oecophoridae). Among these, it belongs to subfamily Oecophorinae. It is the type genus of its subfamily and family. Thus, regardless of the uncertain phylogeny, systematics and taxonomy of its superfamily Gelechioidea, it and its closest relatives always have to be assigned to this family and subfamily as long as these are deemed valid.

== Systematics and taxonomy ==
The genus' type species was initially given as the Tinea sulphurella described by Johan Christian Fabricius in 1777. However, that name is a junior homonym and thus invalid; Fabricius himself had used it two years earlier to describe the moth now known as Esperia sulphurella. But actually, Fabricius' 1777 "T." sulphurella had been described by Carl Linnaeus in 1758 already, who named it Tinea bractella. But subsequent authors placed it in the related genus Alabonia, thus preventing for long the determination of the correct name for the moth invalidly described by Fabricius in 1777.

Invalid scientific names of Oecophora are:

- Aecophora (lapsus)
- Oecophera Costa, 1840 (unjustified emendation)

=== Selected species ===
Species of Oecophora include:

- Oecophora bractella
- Oecophora kindermanni (Herrich-Schäffer, 1852)

Formerly, several other Oecophorinae (e.g. of genus Esperia) have been placed here too.
