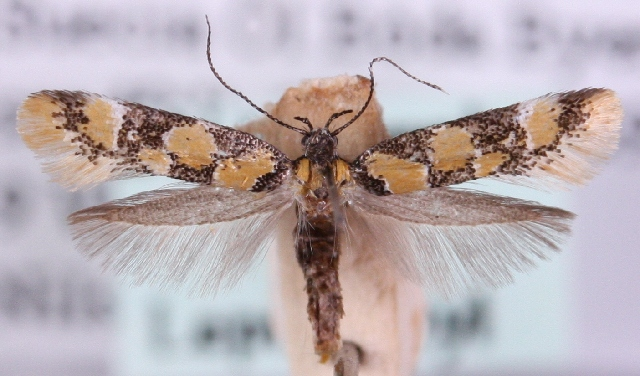

Scientific classification
- Kingdom: Animalia
- Phylum: Arthropoda
- Clade: Pancrustacea
- Class: Insecta
- Order: Lepidoptera
- Family: Oecophoridae
- Genus: Decantha
- Species: D. borkhausenii

Binomial name
- Decantha borkhausenii (Zeller, 1839)

Synonyms
- Oecophora borkhausenii Zeller, 1839

= Decantha borkhausenii =

Species of moth

Decantha borkhausenii is a moth of the family Oecophoridae (concealer moths). It is the type species of the genus Decantha, although it was once placed in the genus Oecophora. It is found in most of Europe, except Ireland, Great Britain, the Benelux, the Iberian Peninsula, most of the Balkan Peninsula, Denmark and Lithuania.

The wingspan is 11–14 mm. The adult moth is yellow and blackish, with a brown hind wing, while the caterpillar is translucent white. Adults are on wing from June to August.

The larvae feed on pine trees, tunnelling under the bark.
