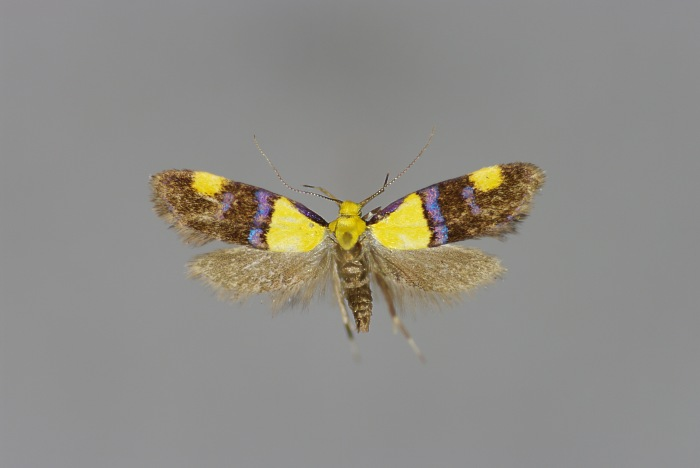

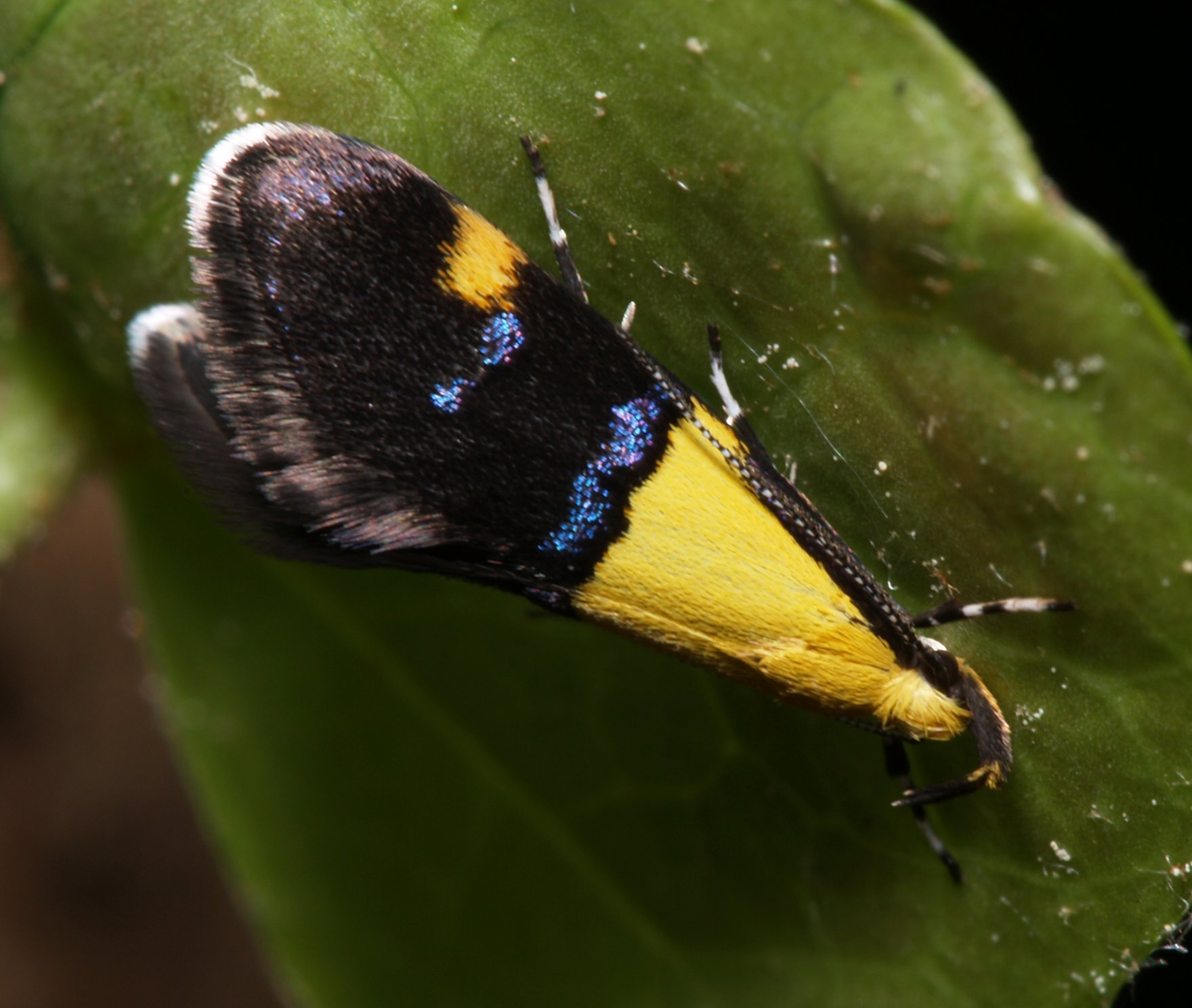
- Adult in Königsforst near Cologne (Germany)

Scientific classification
- Kingdom: Animalia
- Phylum: Arthropoda
- Clade: Pancrustacea
- Class: Insecta
- Order: Lepidoptera
- Family: Oecophoridae
- Genus: Oecophora
- Species: O. bractella

Binomial name
- Oecophora bractella (Linnaeus, 1758)

= Oecophora bractella =

Species of moth

Oecophora bractella is a species of gelechioid moth, native to Europe but introduced to western North America. It belongs to the subfamily Oecophorinae of the concealer moth family (Oecophoridae). As the type species of its genus Oecophora, its affiliations and phylogeny (which are not completely known however) determine the delimitation of that family and subfamily.

== Habitat ==
In its native Europe, it inhabits woodland. The species is not often found in the outlying regions; in the UK for example it has only been recorded from a few patches of old-growth forest in the English Midlands (e.g. Wyre Forest), southern England, and southern Wales (e.g. in the Wye valley).

== Appearance and ecology ==
The adults' wingspan is 12–16 mm. Conspicuously bicolored black and yellow, they also have some iridescent blue markings on the forewings.

The adult moths fly from May to July depending on the location; they are semi-diurnal and can be encountered during the day, but usually are active at dawn. The caterpillars feed on dead and decaying wood, and possibly also on fungi.

== Synonyms ==
This species has suffered from considerable confusion regarding its scientific name. It was first described by C. Linnaeus in 1758, who named it Tinea bractella. After the genus Oecophora had been established, its type species was set to be the Tinea sulphurella described by J.C. Fabricius in 1777. But that name was a junior homonym and thus invalid; Fabricius had actually described the "proper" T. sulphurella (nowadays known as Esperia sulphurella) himself, a mere two years earlier. Subsequent authors placed Linnaeus' species in the related genus Alabonia, while Fabricius' homonymy lingered on into the 20th century. Eventually this was all sorted out, when it was realized that the supposedly different species of Linnaeus and Fabricius were one and the same, and O. bractella has since been known under its current name.

Invalid scientific names (junior synonyms and others) of Oecophora bractella are:

- Alabonia bracteella (lapsus)
- Alabonia bractella (Linnaeus, 1758)
- Tinea bractella Linnaeus, 1758
- Tinea sulphurella Fabricius, 1777 (non Fabricius, 1775: preoccupied)
