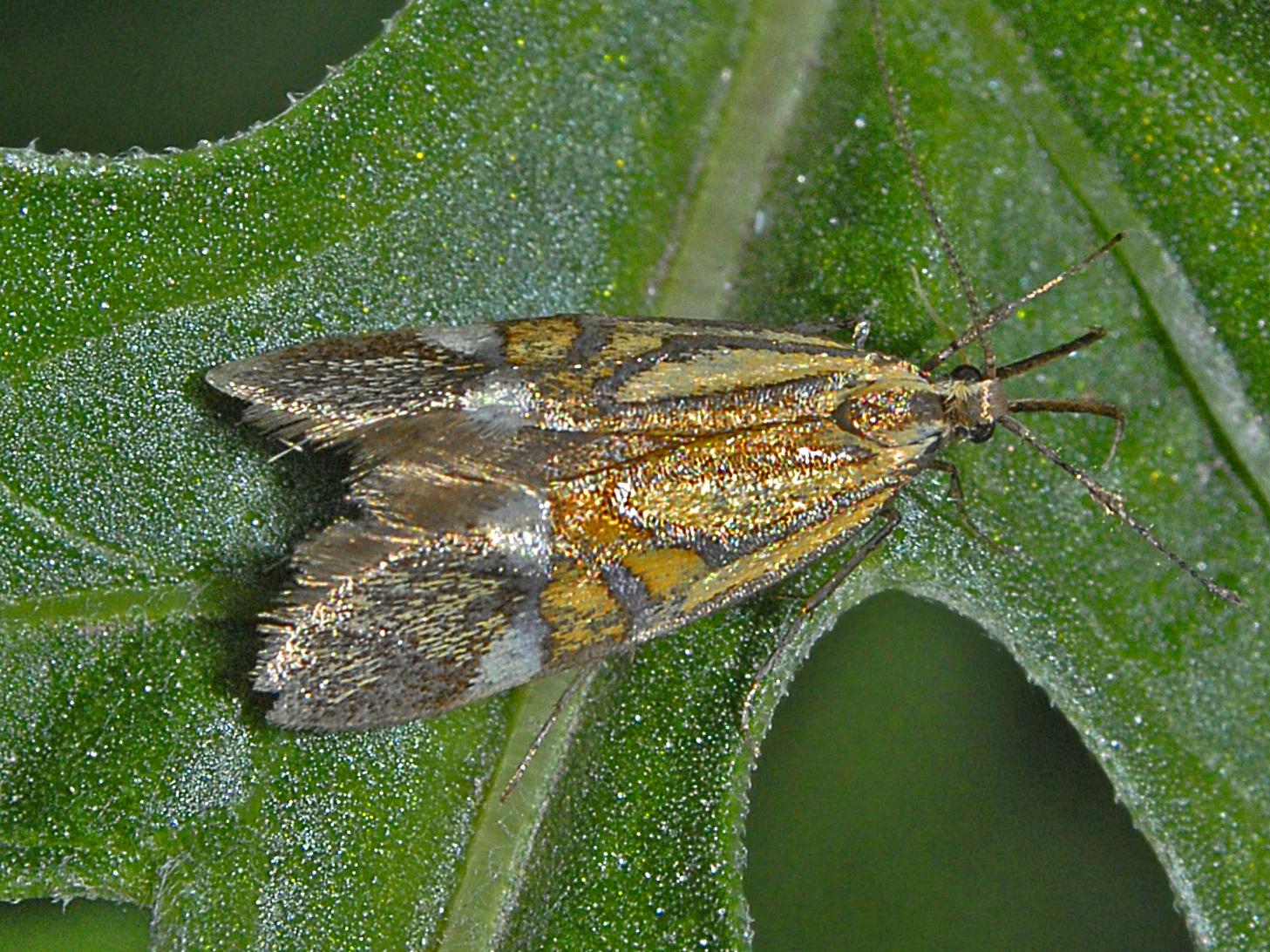

Scientific classification
- Kingdom: Animalia
- Phylum: Arthropoda
- Clade: Pancrustacea
- Class: Insecta
- Order: Lepidoptera
- Family: Oecophoridae
- Genus: Alabonia
- Species: A. staintoniella

Binomial name
- Alabonia staintoniella (Zeller, 1850)

Synonyms
- Harpella staintoniella Zeller, 1850

= Alabonia staintoniella =

Species of moth

Alabonia staintoniella is a species of gelechioid moth. Here, it is placed within the subfamily Oecophorinae of the concealer moth family (Oecophoridae). Alternatively it has been placed in the Elachistidae or Depressariinae together with its presumed closest relatives.

== Description ==
Alabonia staintoniella has a wingspan of 17–21 millimetres (0.67–0.83 in). This little diurnal moth shows yellowish-brown hindwings, with silvery markings, two triangular white spots on the costal and on the inner edge and a blackish fringe. It presents very long labial palps

This species is very similar to Alabonia geoffrella, but it can be distinguished by the lack of dark lines in the terminal part of the wings.

The adults fly from July to August depending on the location.

== Distribution and habitat ==
Alabonia staintoniella can be found in Europe and in the Near East. These moths live in shrubbery rich areas.
