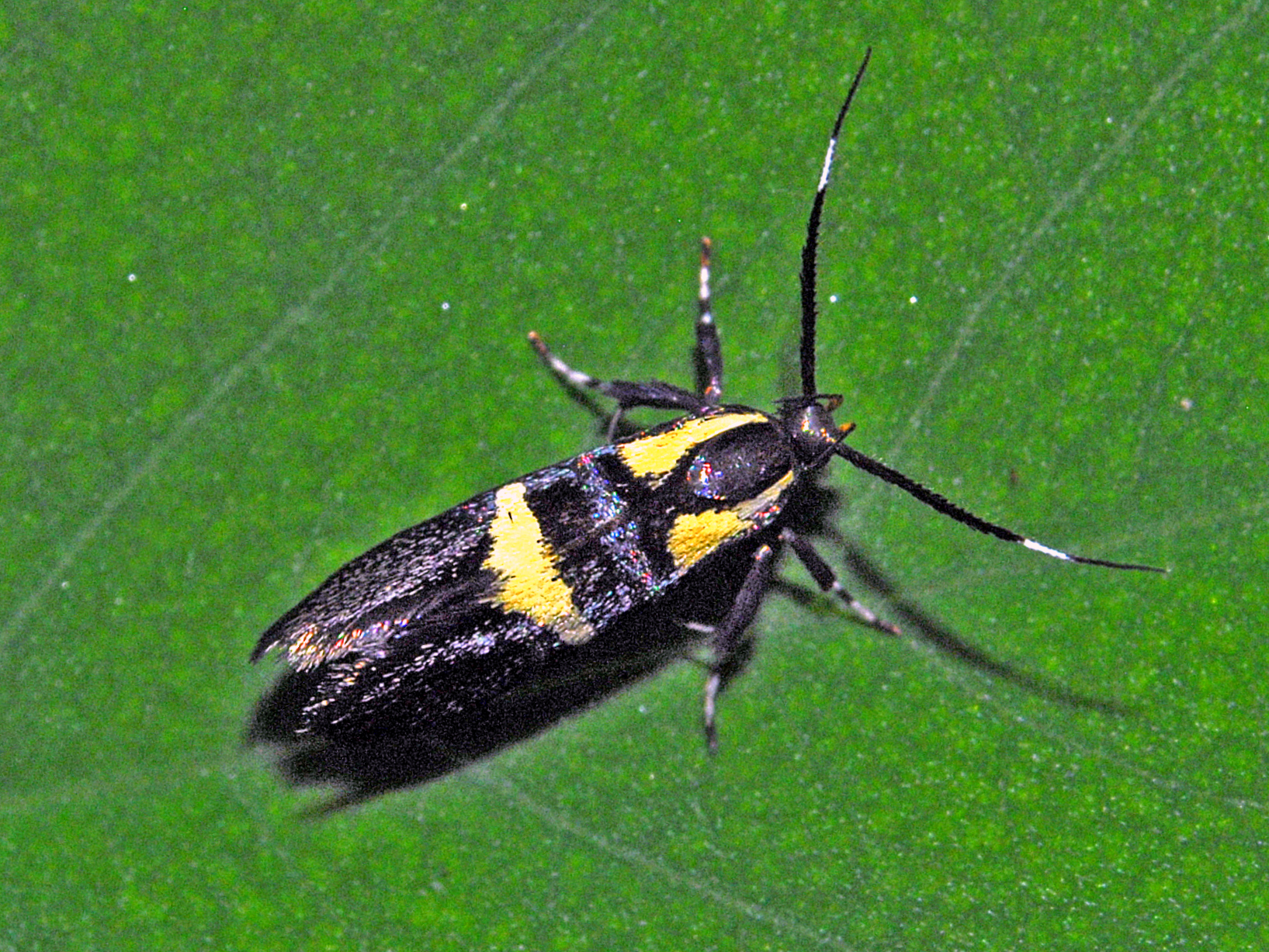
- Esperia oliviella, upperside
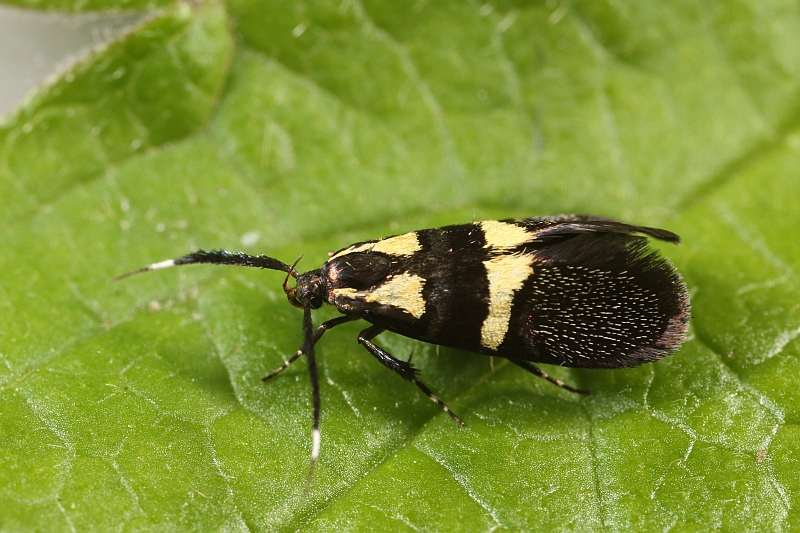
- Side view

Scientific classification
- Kingdom: Animalia
- Phylum: Arthropoda
- Clade: Pancrustacea
- Class: Insecta
- Order: Lepidoptera
- Family: Oecophoridae
- Genus: Esperia
- Species: E. oliviella

Binomial name
- Esperia oliviella (Fabricius, 1794)

Synonyms
- Dasycera oliviella (Fabricius, 1794); Oecophora oliviella (Fabricius, 1794); Tinea aemulella Hübner, 1796

= Esperia oliviella =

Species of moth

Esperia oliviella is a species of gelechioid moth.

== Taxonomy ==
In its superfamily, this species is placed in the genus Esperia within the subfamily Oecophorinae of the concealer moth family (Oecophoridae). Some authors, in particular those that follow a "splitting" approach to gelechioidea systematics and taxonomy, recognize Dasycera as an independent genus. The present species is thus not infrequently listed as Dasycera oliviella; indeed, it is (under its junior synonym Tinea aemulella) the type species of Dasycera.

== Distribution and habitat ==
This species is present in most of Europe (Austria, Belgium, Bosnia and Herzegovina, British Islands, Bulgaria, Croatia, Czech Republic, France, Italy, Germany, Greece, Hungary, Poland, Portugal, Romania, Slovakia, Slovenia, Russia, Spain, Switzerland and the Netherlands) and the Near East. It inhabits old-growth woodland. Though not generally uncommon, at the periphery of its range it is a rare sight. For example, in the UK its only significant populations are in the south and southeast of England, the regions closest to the European continent.

== Description ==
The wingspan is about 15 millimetres (0.59 in). At a casual glance, this species resembles its widespread relative E. sulphurella, being largely black, with a white band half-way across the thick antennae and yellowish forewing markings. Of these, the band across the midwing is not interrupted however, and the proximal lengthwise mark is a shorter triangle rather than a long streak. After eclosion and some time thereafter, E. oliviella also has a pronounced purplish sheen which is far less conspicuous in E. sulphurella even if freshly eclosed. Head and hind wings are black, whitish at the base of the upper edge. Antennae are black, with a white part before the tip.

== Biology ==
Adults are on the wing around June and July (depending on locality) and are diurnal, though they avoid the hot period around noon. The caterpillars live under the bark of various deciduous and pine trees and feed on rotting wood, especially of hazels (Corylus), blackthorn (Prunus spinosa), oaks (Quercus), Picea, Pinus, Pyrus, Robinia, Ulmus, etc. They hibernate and complete development in spring.

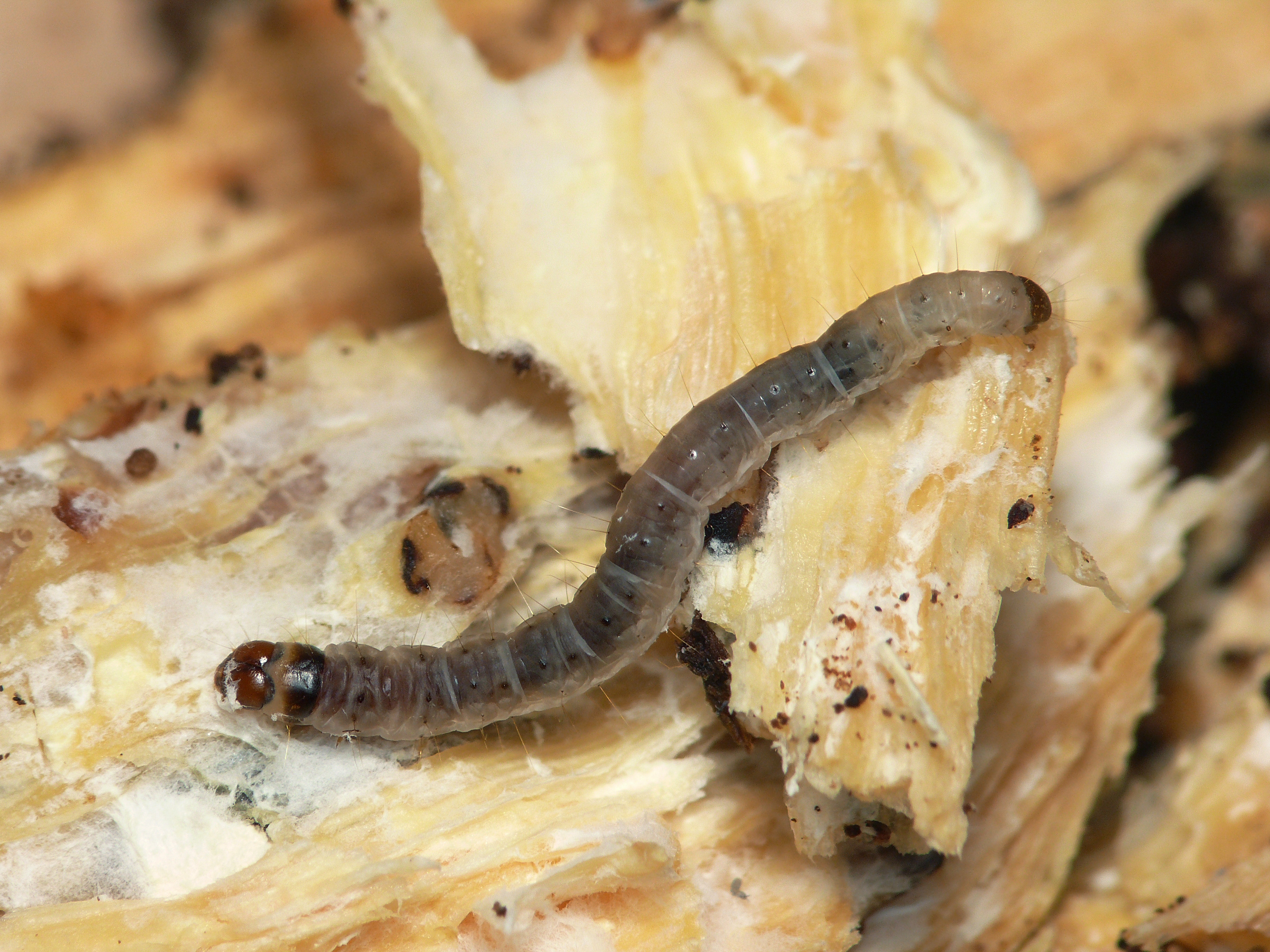

== Bibliography ==
- Bradley, J.D.Checklist of Lepidoptera Recorded from The British Isles, Second Edition (Revised) (2000)
- Emmet, A.M. (Ed.)A Field Guide to the Smaller British Lepidoptera (1988)
- Emmet, A.M., Langmaid, J.R. (Eds.)The Moths and Butterflies of Great Britain and Ireland, Volume 4 (Part 1) (2002)
