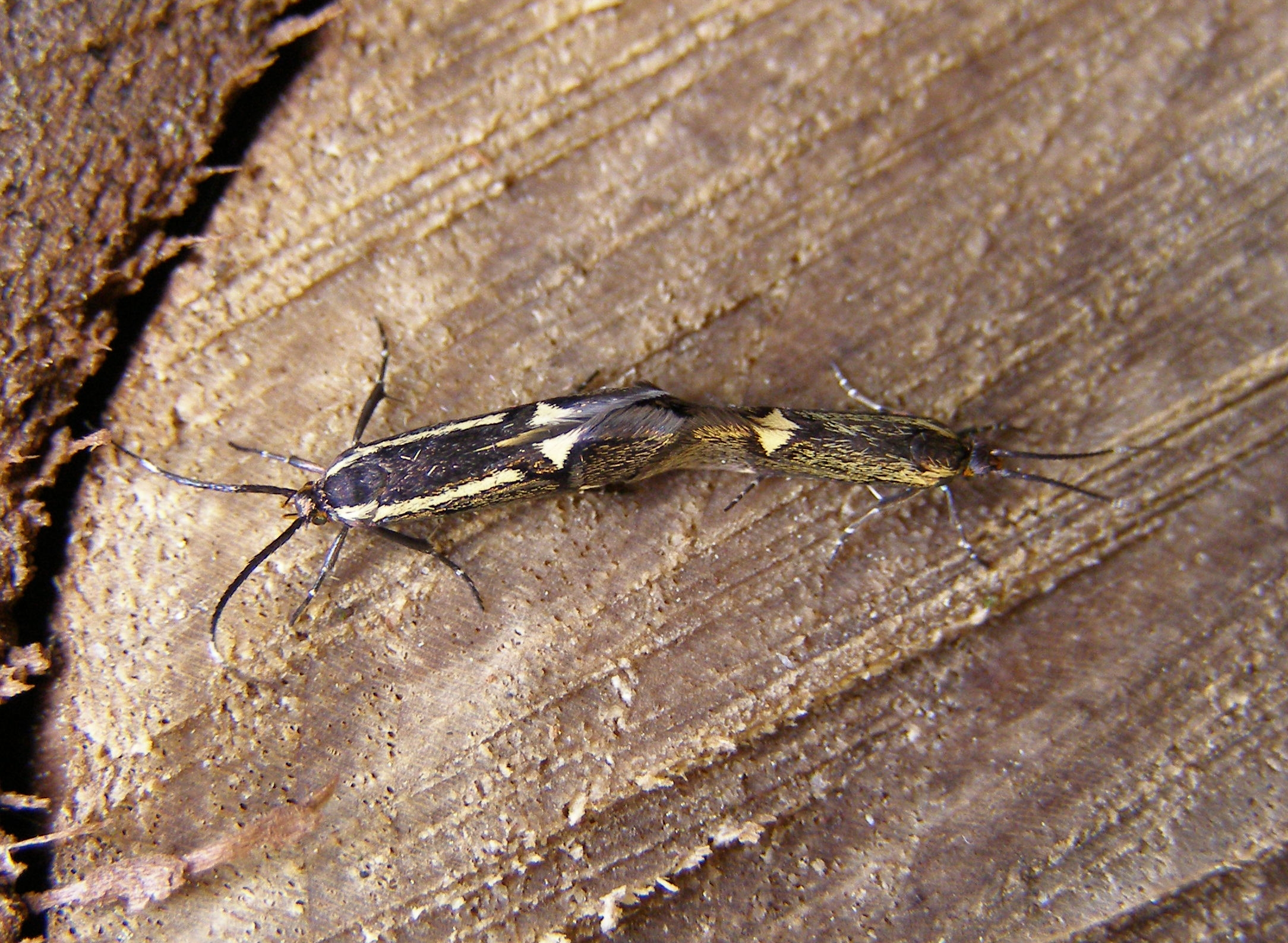
- Mating adults of Esperia sulphurella

Scientific classification
- Kingdom: Animalia
- Phylum: Arthropoda
- Clade: Pancrustacea
- Class: Insecta
- Order: Lepidoptera
- Family: Oecophoridae
- Subfamily: Oecophorinae
- Genus: Esperia; Hübner, 1825

Synonyms
- Numerous, see text

= Esperia (moth) =

Genus of moths

Esperia is a genus of the concealer moth family (Oecophoridae). Among these, it belongs to subfamily Oecophorinae. Most authors include Dasycera here, though approaches that generally follow a "splitting" approach sometimes do not.

The type species of Esperia (originally described as Tinea orbonella, now E. sulphurella) has some differences versus the type species of Dasycera (originally described as T. aemulella, now E. oliviella), but these are slight and at present it is not determined whether they justify the maintenance of two small genera versus a more comprehensive genus containing two subgenera.

== Selected species ==
Species of Esperia (including Dasycera) include:

- Esperia imitatrix (Zeller, 1847)
- Esperia krueperella (Staudinger, 1871)
- Esperia oliviella
- Esperia sulphurella

== Synonyms ==
Invalid scientific names (junior synonyms and others) of Esperia are:

- Dasycera Stephens 1829 (but see above)
- Dasycerus Haworth 1828 (non Brongniart, 1800: preoccupied)
- Gnaphalodeocera Agassiz, 1847 (unjustified emendation)
- Gnaphalodocera Blanchard, 1840
- Hermiona Blanchard, 1845
- Stenoptera Duponchel, 1838
