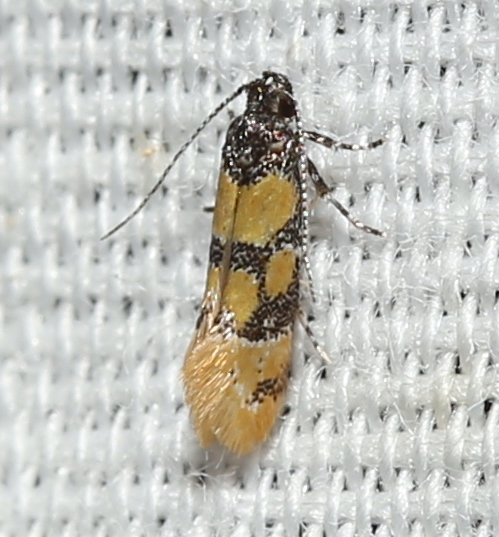

Scientific classification
- Kingdom: Animalia
- Phylum: Arthropoda
- Class: Insecta
- Order: Lepidoptera
- Family: Oecophoridae
- Genus: Decantha
- Species: D. stecia

Binomial name
- Decantha stecia Hodges, 1974

= Decantha stecia =

Species of moth

Decantha stecia, the small Decantha moth, is a moth in the family Oecophoridae. It is 3–3.5 mm (0.12–0.14 in) in length.

Found in Eastern United States of America from Louisiana and Florida north to Ohio and Massachucets, up to an elevation of 610 m (2,000 ft).
