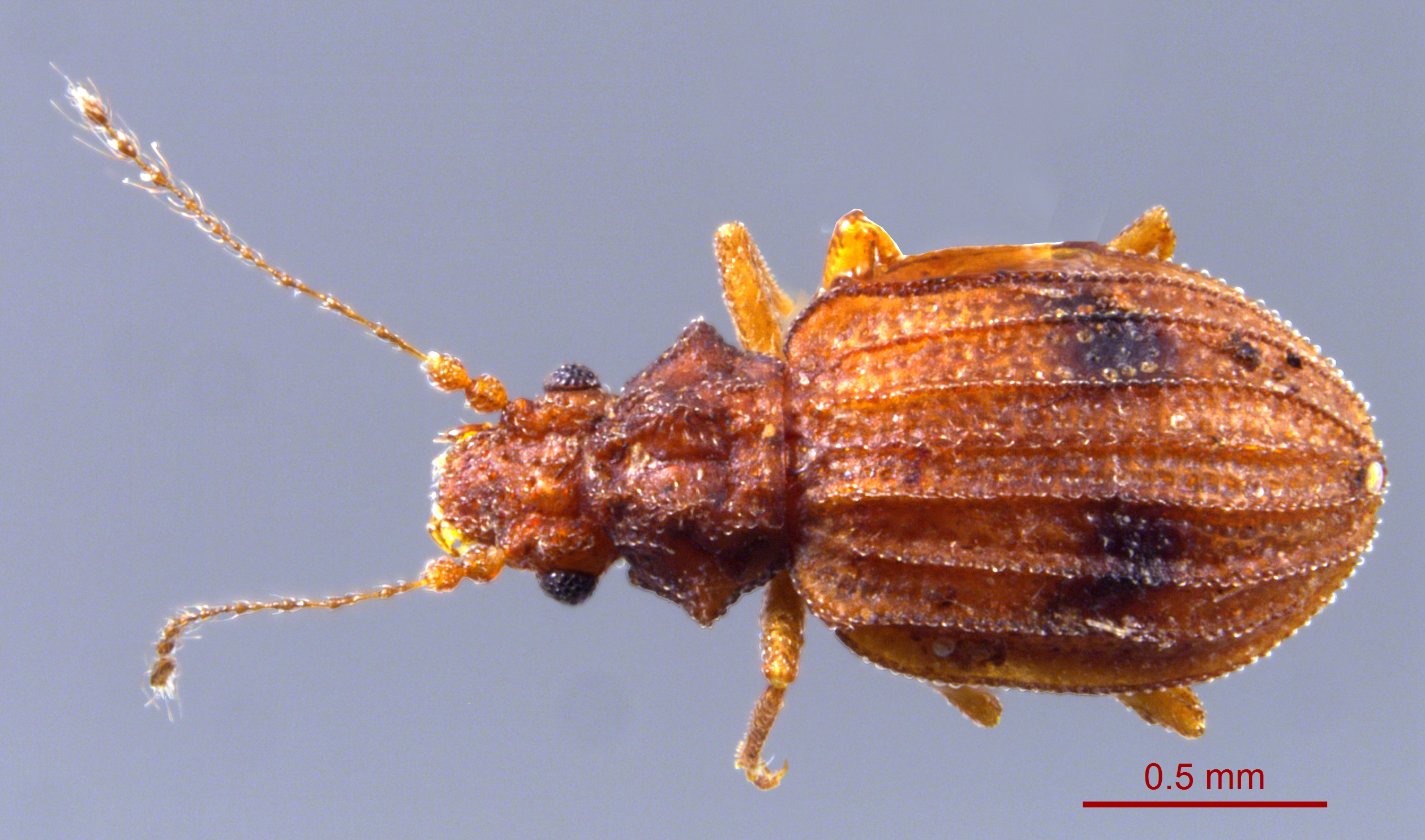
- Dasycerus bicolor

Scientific classification
- Kingdom: Animalia
- Phylum: Arthropoda
- Class: Insecta
- Order: Coleoptera
- Suborder: Polyphaga
- Infraorder: Staphyliniformia
- Family: Staphylinidae
- Subfamily: Dasycerinae; Reitter, 1887

Genera
- 1 extant genus, 3 extinct; see text.

= Dasycerinae =

Subfamily of beetles

Dasycerinae is a subfamily of rove beetles. Dasycerinae currently only contains 1 extant genus and 3 extinct genera.

== Genera ==
There are currently 4 described genera in Dasycerinae:

- †Cedasyrus Yin & Cai, 2020
- Dasycerus Brongniart, 1800
- †Protodasycerus Yamamoto, 2016
- †Vetudasycerus Cai, Thayer, Newton, Yin & Huang, 2018

(† = extinct)

== Anatomy ==
They have antennae with 11 segments and trisegmented antennal clubs. The tarsi have three segments, and the elytra cover or nearly cover the entire abdomen.

== Ecology ==
These beetles inhabit moist broadleaf forest litter. Eastern species are wingless with small eyes; dissected females have only been found with a single egg. They are known to occur on fruiting fungi, but may not specifically feed on them.
