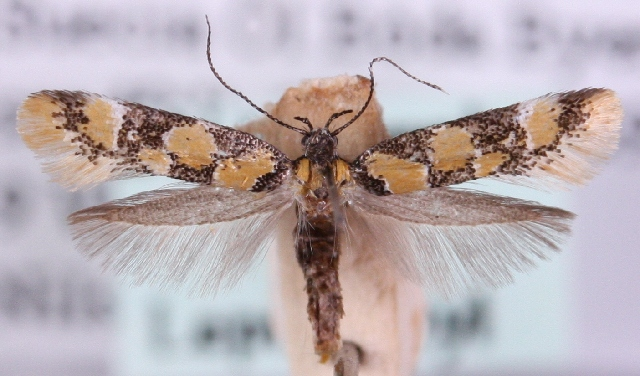
- Decantha borkhausenii

Scientific classification
- Kingdom: Animalia
- Phylum: Arthropoda
- Class: Insecta
- Order: Lepidoptera
- Family: Oecophoridae
- Subfamily: Oecophorinae
- Tribe: Oecophorini
- Genus: Decantha; Busck, 1908

= Decantha =

Genus of moths

Decantha is a genus of moths belonging to the family Oecophoridae.

The species of this genus are found in Europe and Northern America.

== Species ==
- Decantha borkhausenii (Zeller, 1839)
- Decantha luquetiella Vives, 1986
- Decantha minuta Busck, 1914
- Decantha stecia Hodges, 1974
- Decantha stonda Hodges, 1974
- Decantha tistra
- Decantha tristra Hodges, 1974
