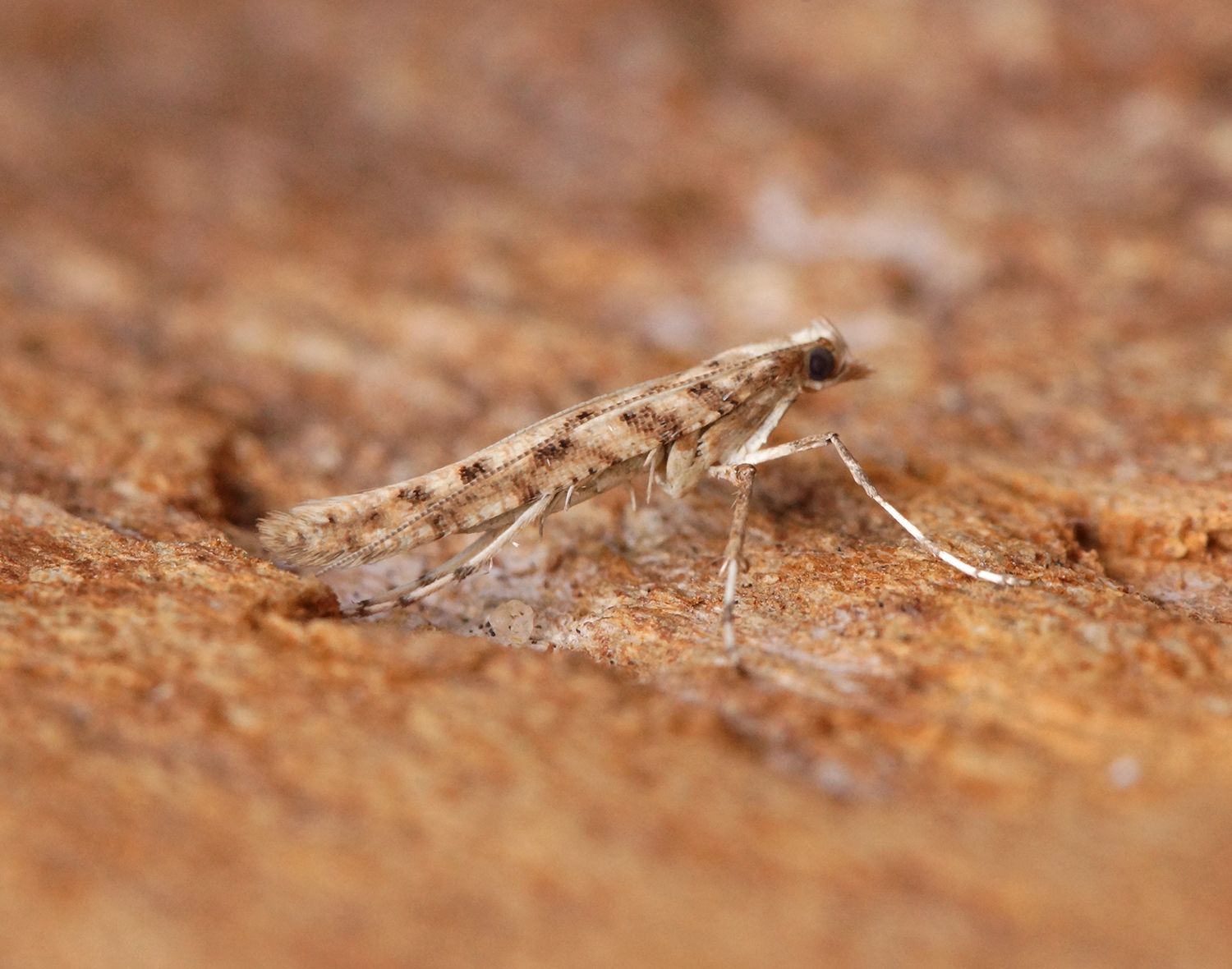

Scientific classification
- Kingdom: Animalia
- Phylum: Arthropoda
- Class: Insecta
- Order: Lepidoptera
- Family: Gracillariidae
- Genus: Caloptilia
- Species: C. leucapennella

Binomial name
- Caloptilia leucapennella (Stephens, 1835)

Synonyms
- Gracillaria leucapennella Stephens, 1835; Povolnya leucapennella (Stephens, 1835); Coriscium citrinellum Zeller, 1839

= Caloptilia leucapennella =

Species of moth

Caloptilia leucapennella is a moth of the family Gracillariidae. It is known from all of Europe, except the Balkan Peninsula.

The wingspan is about 13 mm. The posterior tibiae are smooth above. Forewings are pale whitish yellow, with some scattered minute black dots, variable in development; sometimes spots of grey strigulae, especially in disc; sometimes a ferruginous black -spotted median longitudinal streak from base of costa to apex. Hindwings are dark grey. Adults are on wing from July to October and overwinter.

The larvae feed on evergreen oak (Quercus ilex) and common oak (Quercus robur). They mine the leaves of their host plant.
