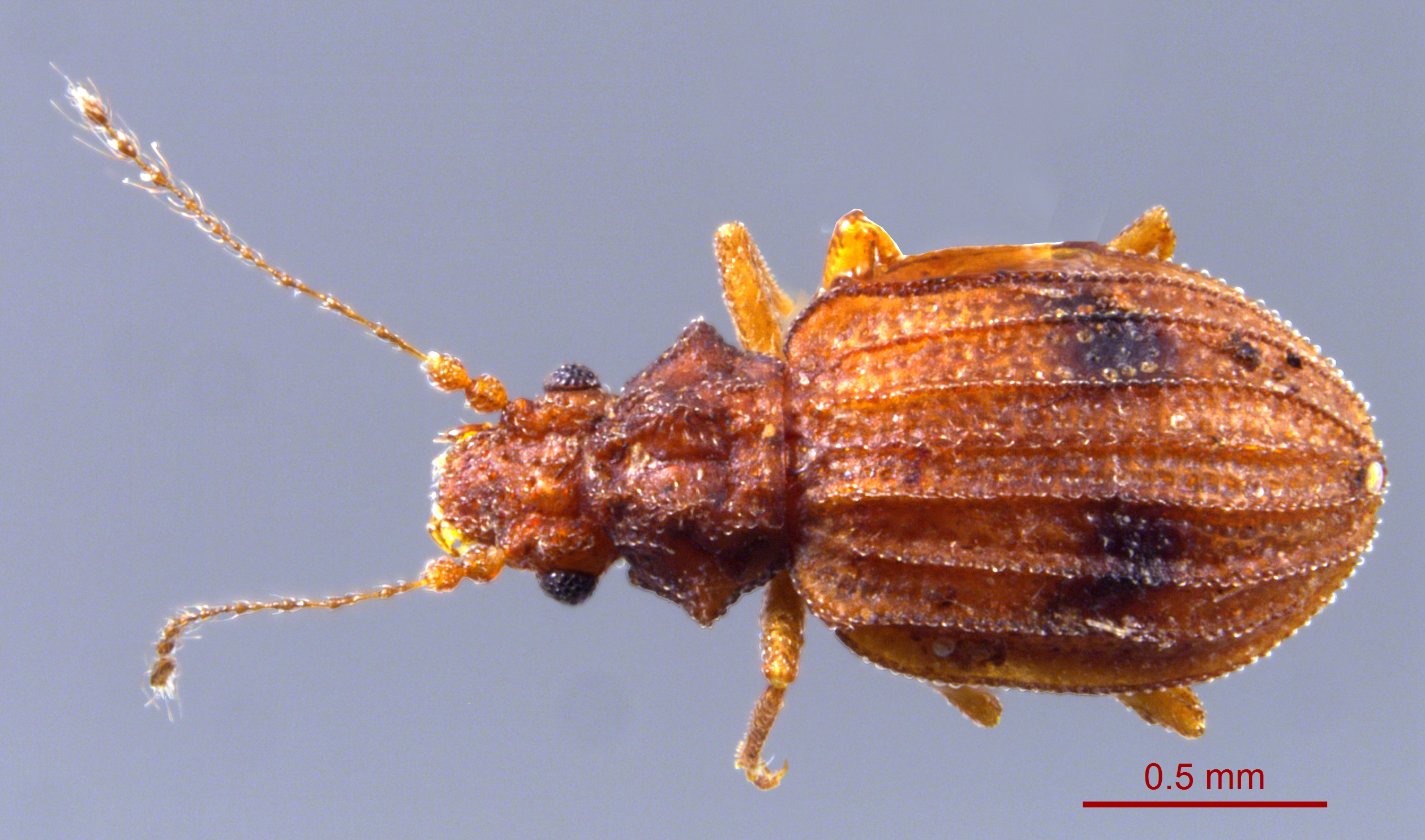
- Dasycerus bicolor

Scientific classification
- Domain: Eukaryota
- Kingdom: Animalia
- Phylum: Arthropoda
- Class: Insecta
- Order: Coleoptera
- Suborder: Polyphaga
- Infraorder: Staphyliniformia
- Family: Staphylinidae
- Subfamily: Dasycerinae
- Genus: Dasycerus; Brongniart, 1800

Species
- 19 species, see text

= Dasycerus =

Genus of beetle

Dasycerus is the only extant genus in the rove beetle subfamily Dasycerinae. It contains 25 currently recognized species, with a new species described as recently as 2022. Even more recently, nine cryptic species have been discovered in 2024, previously presumed to be D. carolinensis. They are only distinguishable through male aedeagal dissection or DNA analysis.

== Species ==
Species are:

- Dasycerus angulicollis Horn, 1882
- Dasycerus audax Löbl, 1988
- Dasycerus beloni Pic, 1905
- Dasycerus bicolor Wheeler, Q. D. & McHugh, 1994
- Dasycerus carolinensis Horn, 1882
- Dasycerus chattooga
- Dasycerus concolor Löbl & Calame, 1996
- Dasycerus cornutus Löbl, 1977
- Dasycerus crenatus Motschulsky, 1839
- Dasycerus egwanulti
- Dasycerus elongatus Reitter, 1875
- Dasycerus fasciatus Löbl, 1977
- Dasycerus gadalutsi
- Dasycerus inexspectatus Löbl, 1986
- Dasycerus itseyi
- Dasycerus japonicus Nakane, 1963
- Dasycerus jonicus Reitter, 1884
- Dasycerus monticola Löbl, 1988
- Dasycerus nikwasi
- Dasycerus numidicus Pic, 1905
- Dasycerus occultus Hashizume & Maruyama, 2022
- Dasycerus pacolet
- Dasycerus poseidon Hu, Fang-Shuo & Wei-Ren Liang, 2021
- Dasycerus sulcatus Brongniart, 1800
- Dasycerus tuckasegee
- Dasycerus virginiensis
- Dasycerus unicoi
