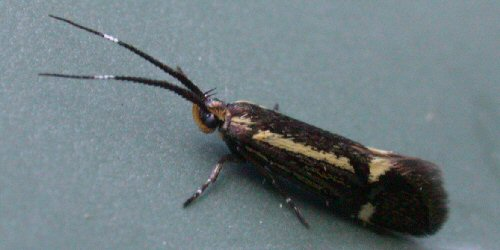

Scientific classification
- Kingdom: Animalia
- Phylum: Arthropoda
- Class: Insecta
- Order: Lepidoptera
- Family: Oecophoridae
- Genus: Esperia
- Species: E. sulphurella

Binomial name
- Esperia sulphurella (Fabricius, 1775)

Synonyms
- Esperia aucta (Krausse, 1915); Esperia orbonella (Hübner, [1813]); Tinea orbonella Hübner, [1813] Tinea sulphurella Fabricius, 1775

= Esperia sulphurella =

Species of moth

Esperia sulphurella, also known as the sulphur tubic, is a species of gelechioid moth in the family Oecophoridae. It is native to Europe, but has been introduced in California.

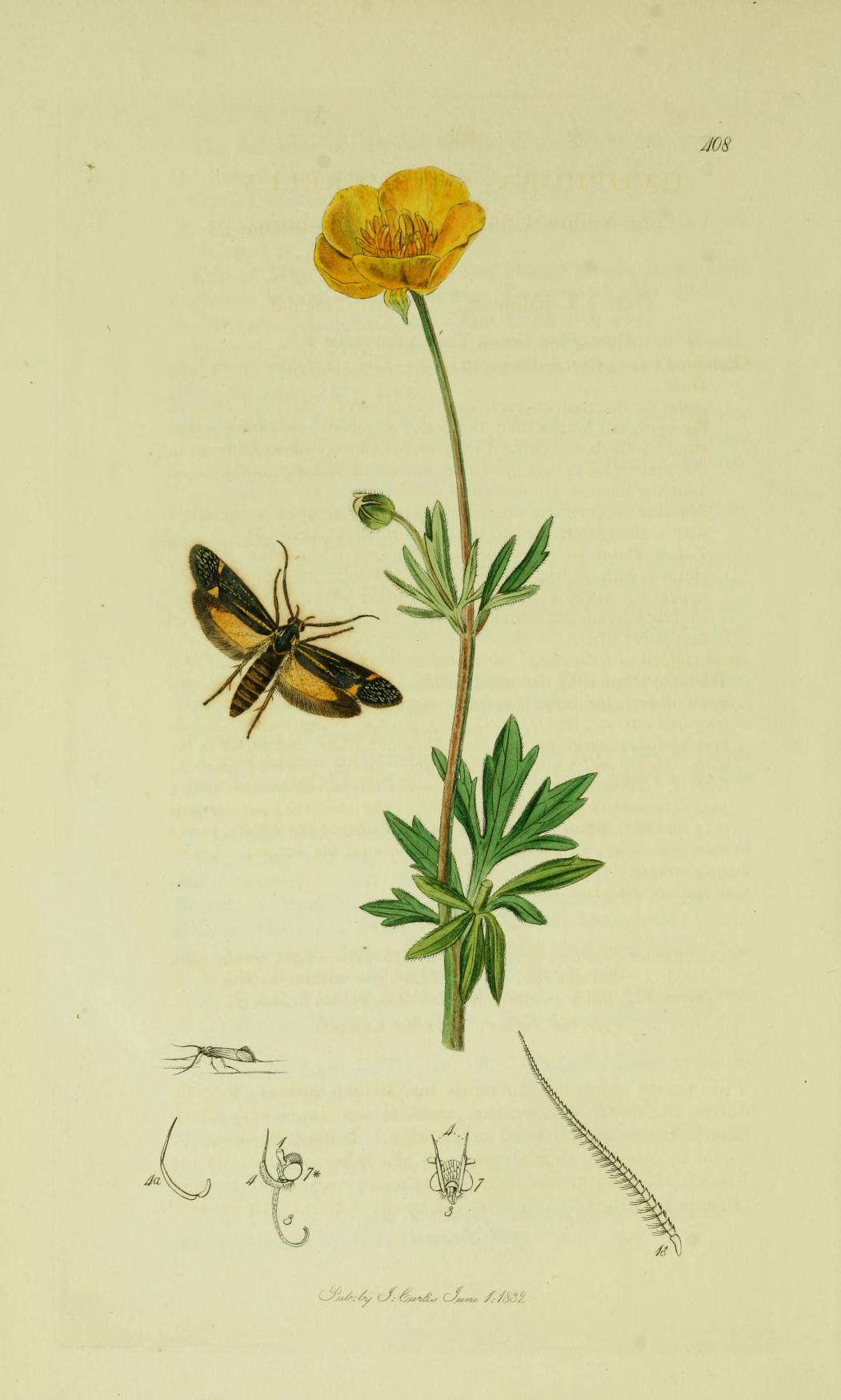
Illustration from John Curtis's British Entomology Volume 6

Adults have a body length of 6–8 millimetres (0.24–0.31 in), and its wingspan is 12–16 millimetres (0.47–0.63 in). The wingspan is between 12 and 16 millimeters. They have a dark brown ground colour. The forewing has a pale yellow marking. The predominantly pale yellow hind wings are dark brown at the tips. At about two-thirds of the length of the antennae, the antennae have a white band.

They are on wing in spring.

The larvae are black and feed on dead wood.

== Taxonomy ==
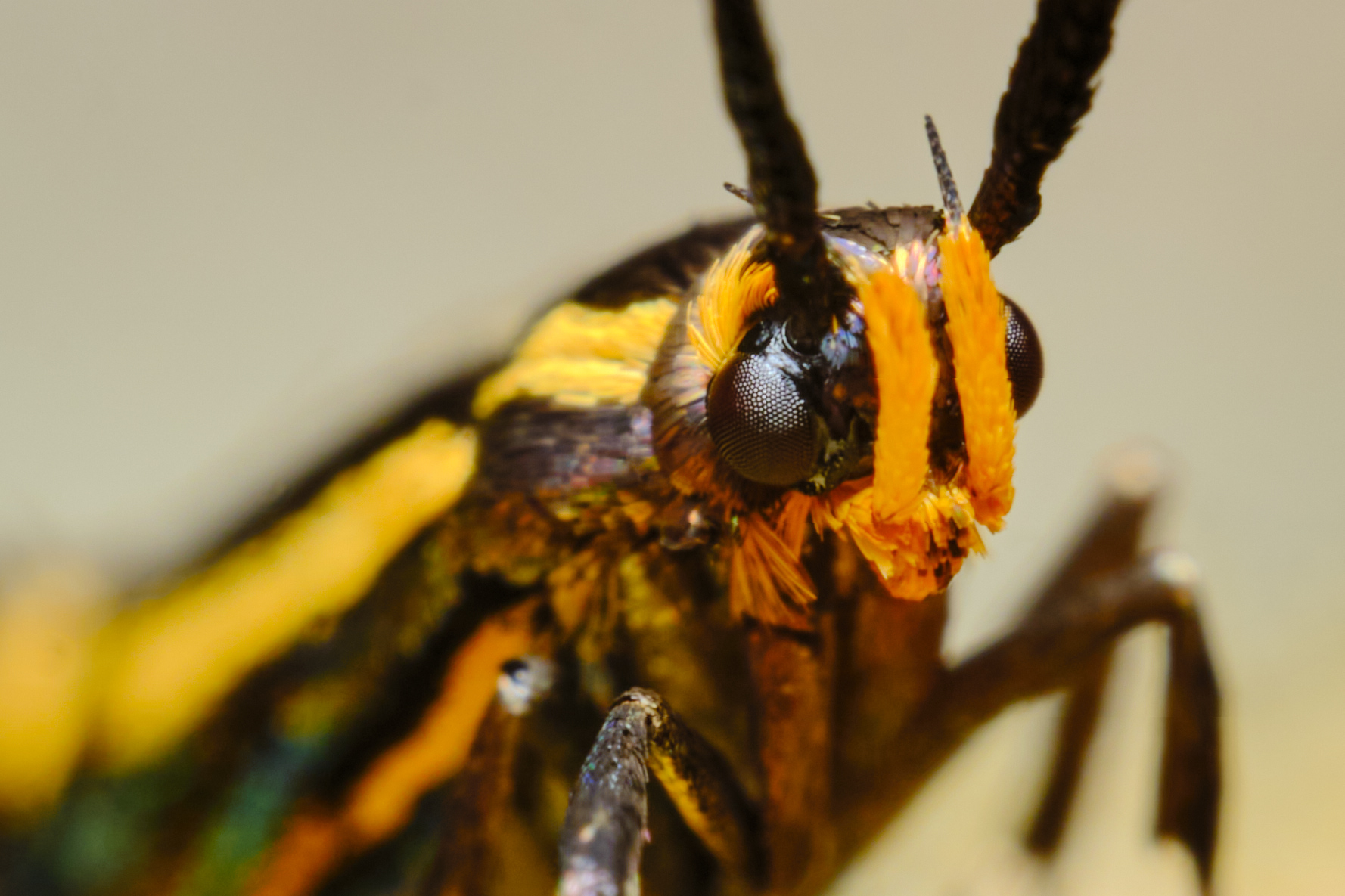
Esperia sulphurella

E. sulphurella was first described scientifically by J.C. Fabricius in 1775. Subsequently, the same scientific name was used for several other moths, creating a number of junior homonyms that are all invalid. These include:

- T. sulphurella of Fabricius (1777) is Oecophora bractella
- T. sulphurella of Hübner (1793) is Ypsolophus sulphurella
- T. sulphurella of Haworth (1829) is Povolnya leucapennella
