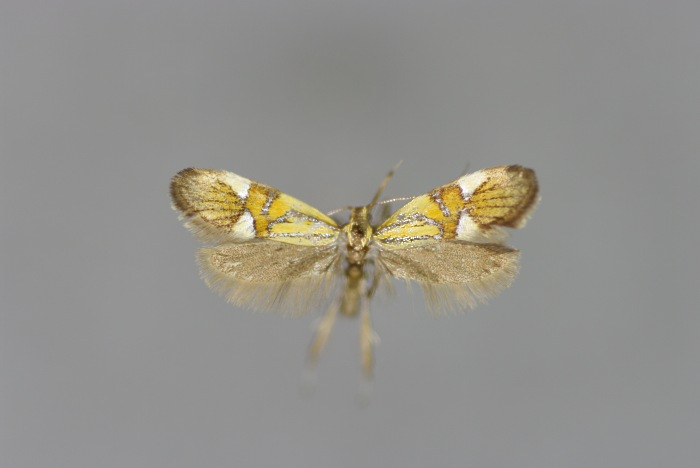

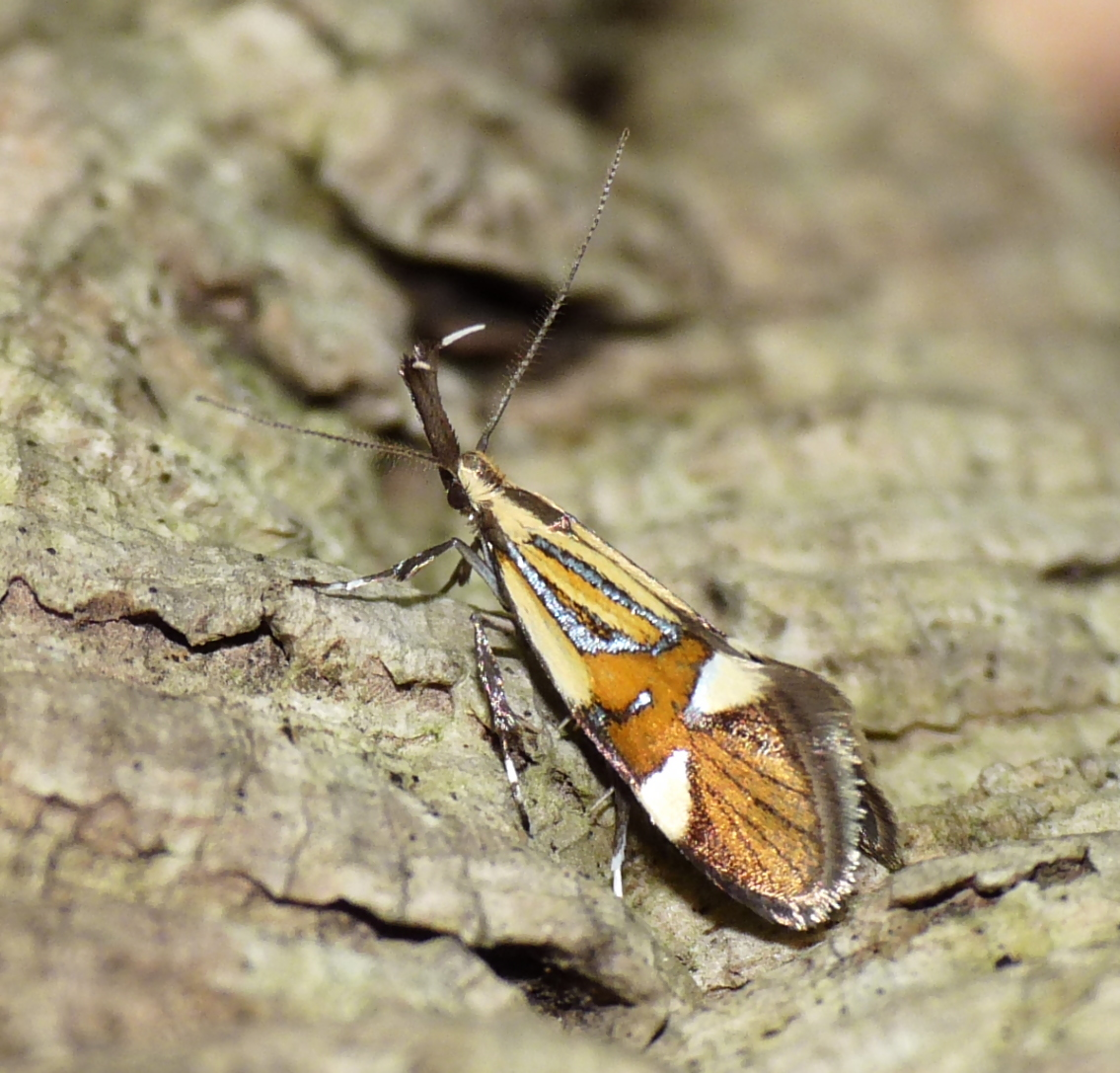
- Alabonia geoffrella, lateral view

Scientific classification
- Kingdom: Animalia
- Phylum: Arthropoda
- Clade: Pancrustacea
- Class: Insecta
- Order: Lepidoptera
- Family: Oecophoridae
- Genus: Alabonia
- Species: A. geoffrella

Binomial name
- Alabonia geoffrella (Linnaeus, 1767)

Synonyms
- Phalaena geoffrella Linnaeus, 1767

= Alabonia geoffrella =

Species of moth

Alabonia geoffrella is a species of gelechioid moth. Here, it is placed within the subfamily Oecophorinae of the concealer moth family (Oecophoridae). Alternatively it has been placed in the Elachistidae or Depressariinae together with its presumed closest relatives.

== Description ==
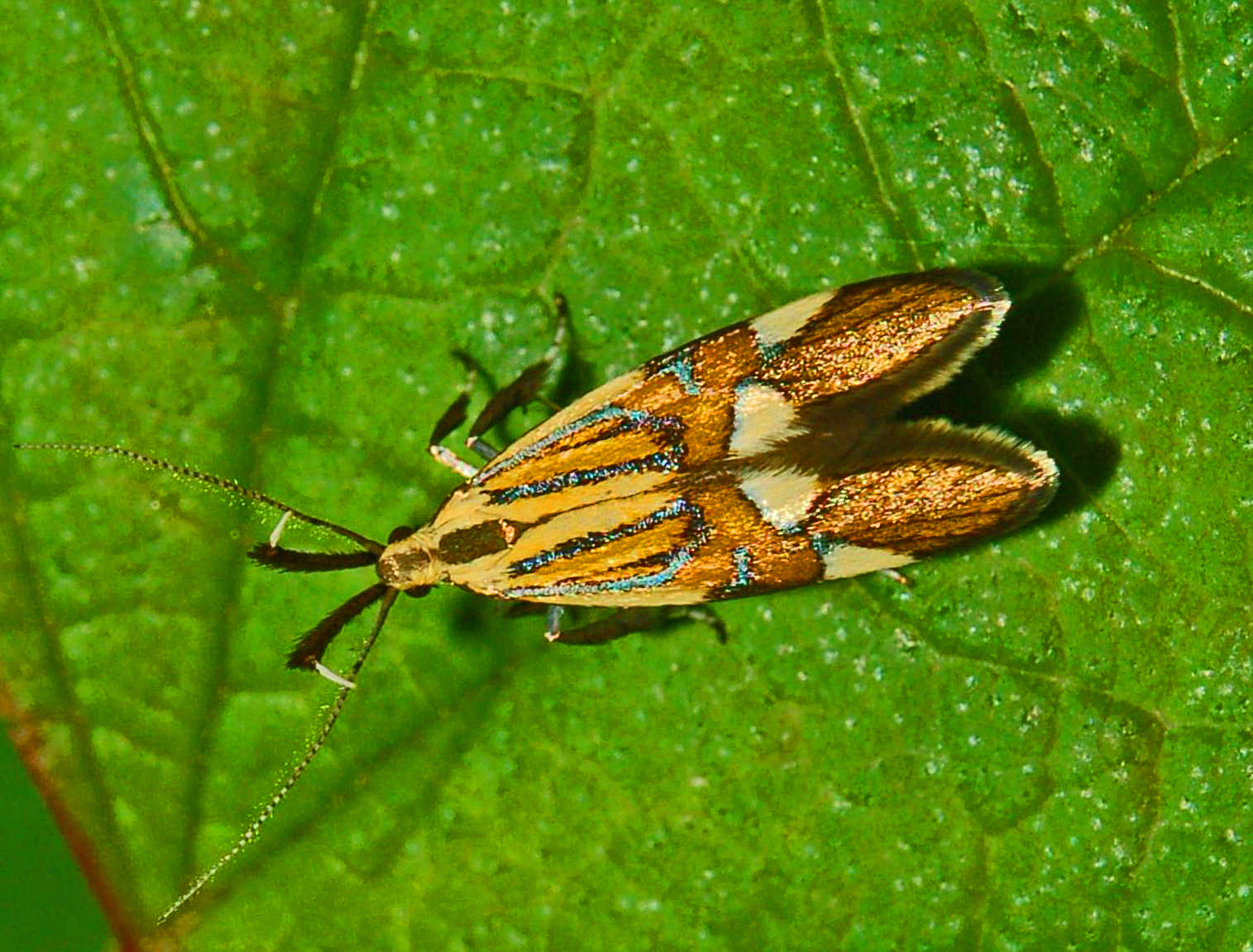
Alabonia geoffrella, dorsal view

The adults fly from May to June depending on the location. The wingspan of this day-flying (or diurnal) moth is 17–21 mm, and it is quite colorful, with a light to dark rusty-red background, bold white markings and a more delicate metallic-blue pattern. The labial palps are conspicuously enlarged. Meyrick describes it - Head and thorax are yellow, with a central dark fuscous stripe. Forewings yellow, posteriorly becoming deeper and suffused with dark fuscous, especially on veins; a bluish-silvery blackish-edged streak from base above middle to 2/5, thence bent down to join a similar straight subdorsal streak from base above middle of dorsum; a bluish-silvery blackish-edged transverse streak from costa before middle to disc; a large whitish -yellow dark -edged triangular spot on costa at 2/3, and another before tornus. Hindwings dark fuscous.

The caterpillars feed on rotting wood; mostly living under tree bark, they have also been found inside dead branches of common hazel (Corylus avellana) and blackberries (Rubus subgenus Rubus section Rubus).

== Distribution and habitat ==
Alabonia geoffrella is found in Europe, where it is not rare in many woodlands and marshlands.
