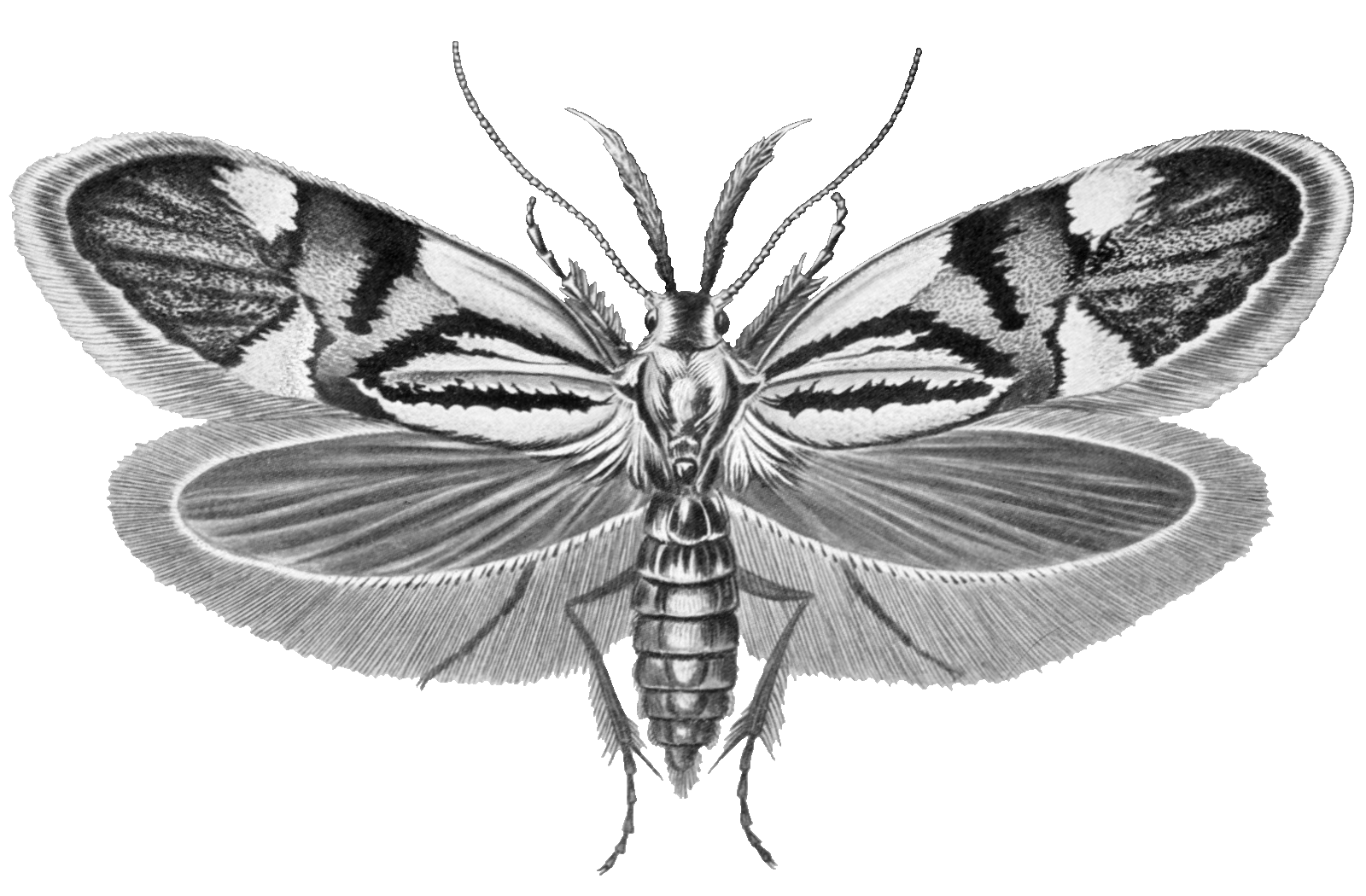
- Adult Alabonia geoffrella drawing from Ernst Haeckel's Kunstformen der Natur (1904)

Scientific classification
- Kingdom: Animalia
- Phylum: Arthropoda
- Clade: Pancrustacea
- Class: Insecta
- Order: Lepidoptera
- Family: Oecophoridae
- Subfamily: Oecophorinae
- Genus: Alabonia; Hübner, 1825

= Alabonia =

Genus of moths

Alabonia is a genus of gelechioid moths. Here, it is placed within the subfamily Oecophorinae of the concealer moth family (Oecophoridae). Alternatively it has been placed in the Elachistidae or Depressariinae together with its presumed closest relatives. It has also been proposed to separate Alabonia and closely related genera as a subfamily Enicostominae (after the junior synonym of Alabonia), but this has generally not been followed by recent authors regardless of where they placed the present genus.

Species include:

- Alabonia chapmani Walsingham, 1903
- Alabonia geoffrella
- Alabonia herculeella Walsingham, 1903
- Alabonia staintoniella (Zeller, 1850)
- Alabonia superior Rebel, 1917

Junior synonyms of Alabonia are:

- Enicostoma Stephens, 1829
- Henicostoma Agassiz, 1847 (unjustified emendation)
