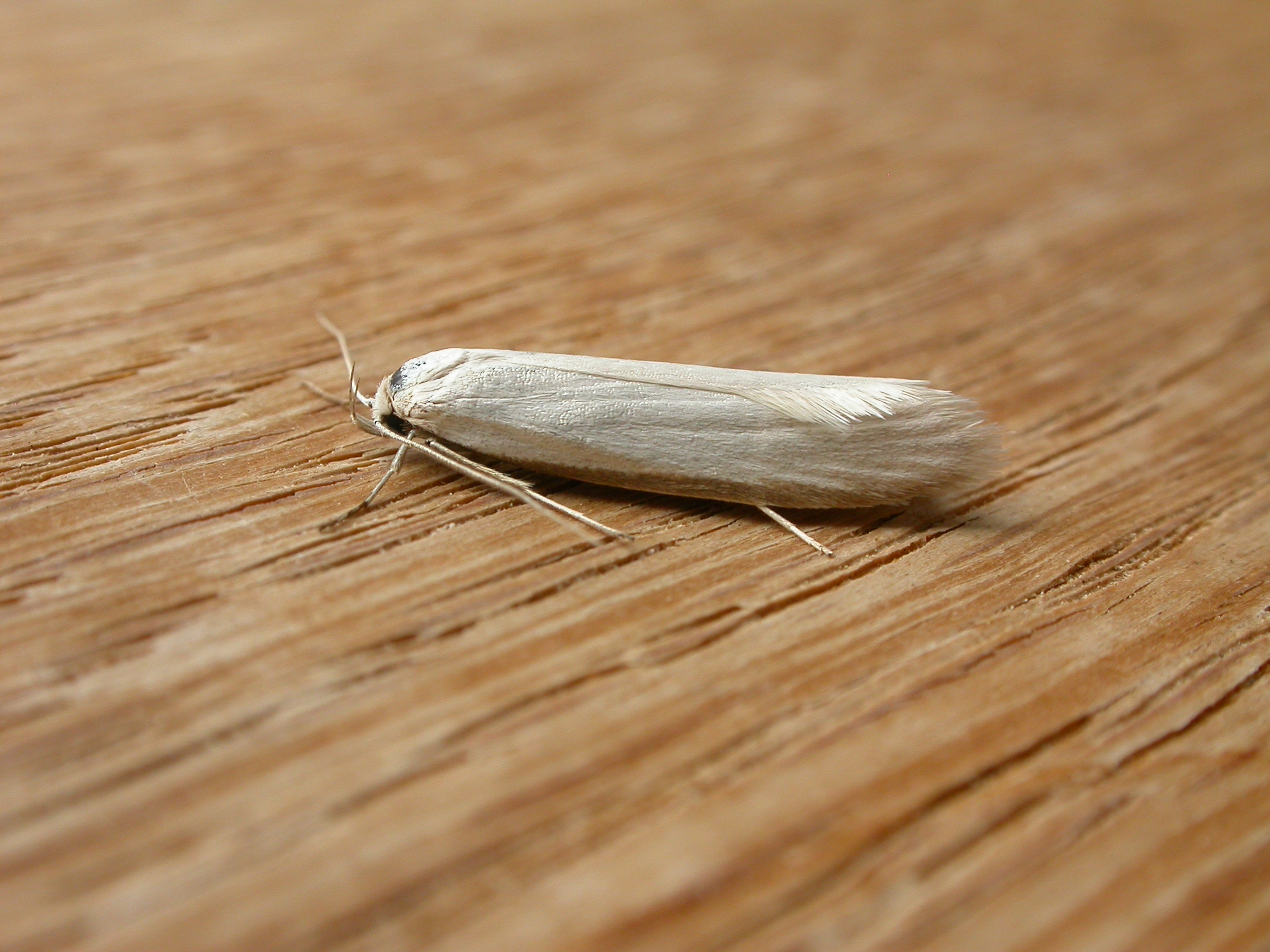

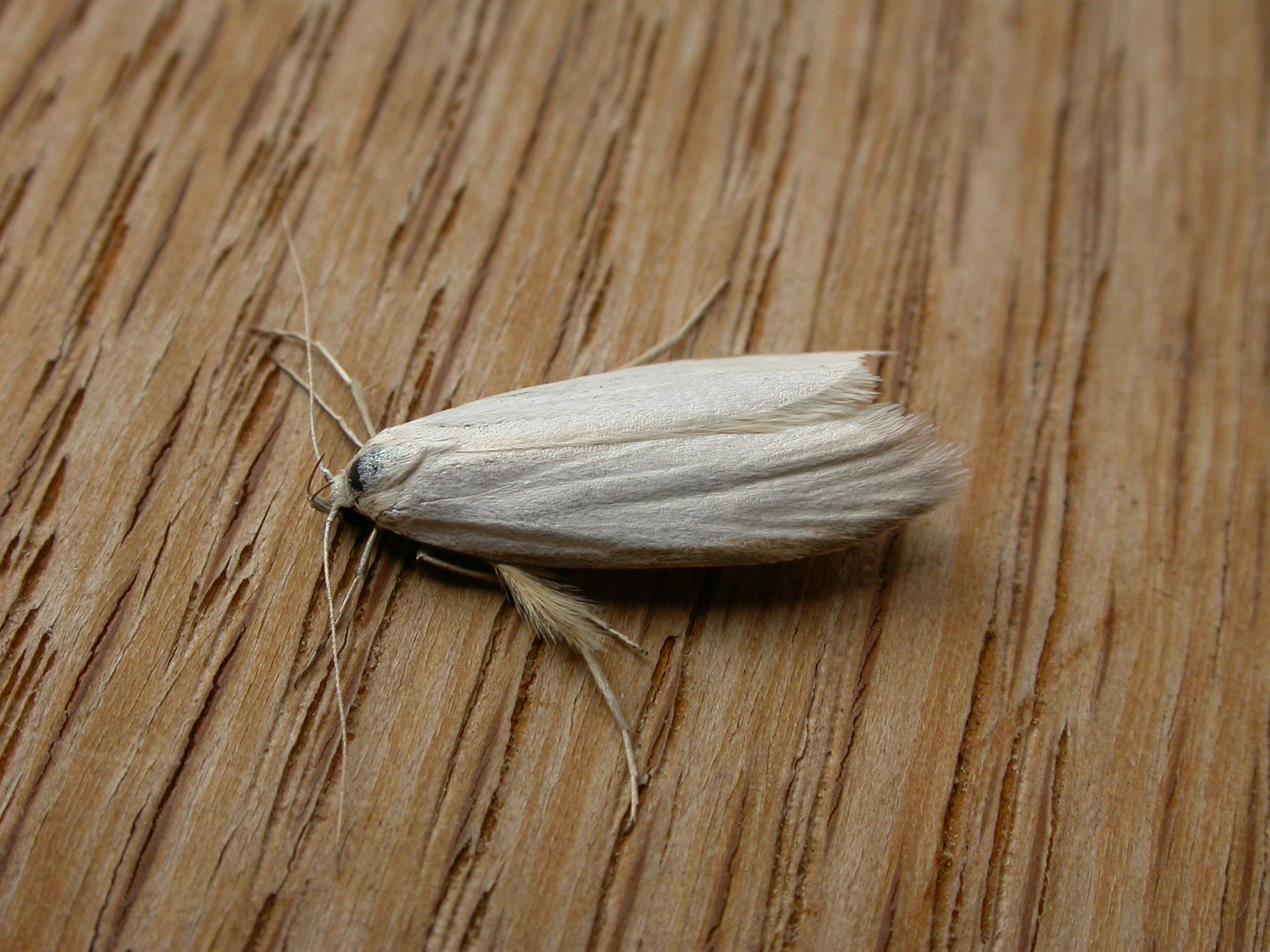

Scientific classification
- Kingdom: Animalia
- Phylum: Arthropoda
- Class: Insecta
- Order: Lepidoptera
- Family: Oecophoridae
- Genus: Zacorus
- Species: Z. carus

Binomial name
- Zacorus carus Butler, 1882

= Zacorus carus =

Species of moth

Zacorus carus is a moth of the family Oecophoridae. It is known from the Australian Capital Territory, New South Wales, Queensland, Tasmania and Victoria.
