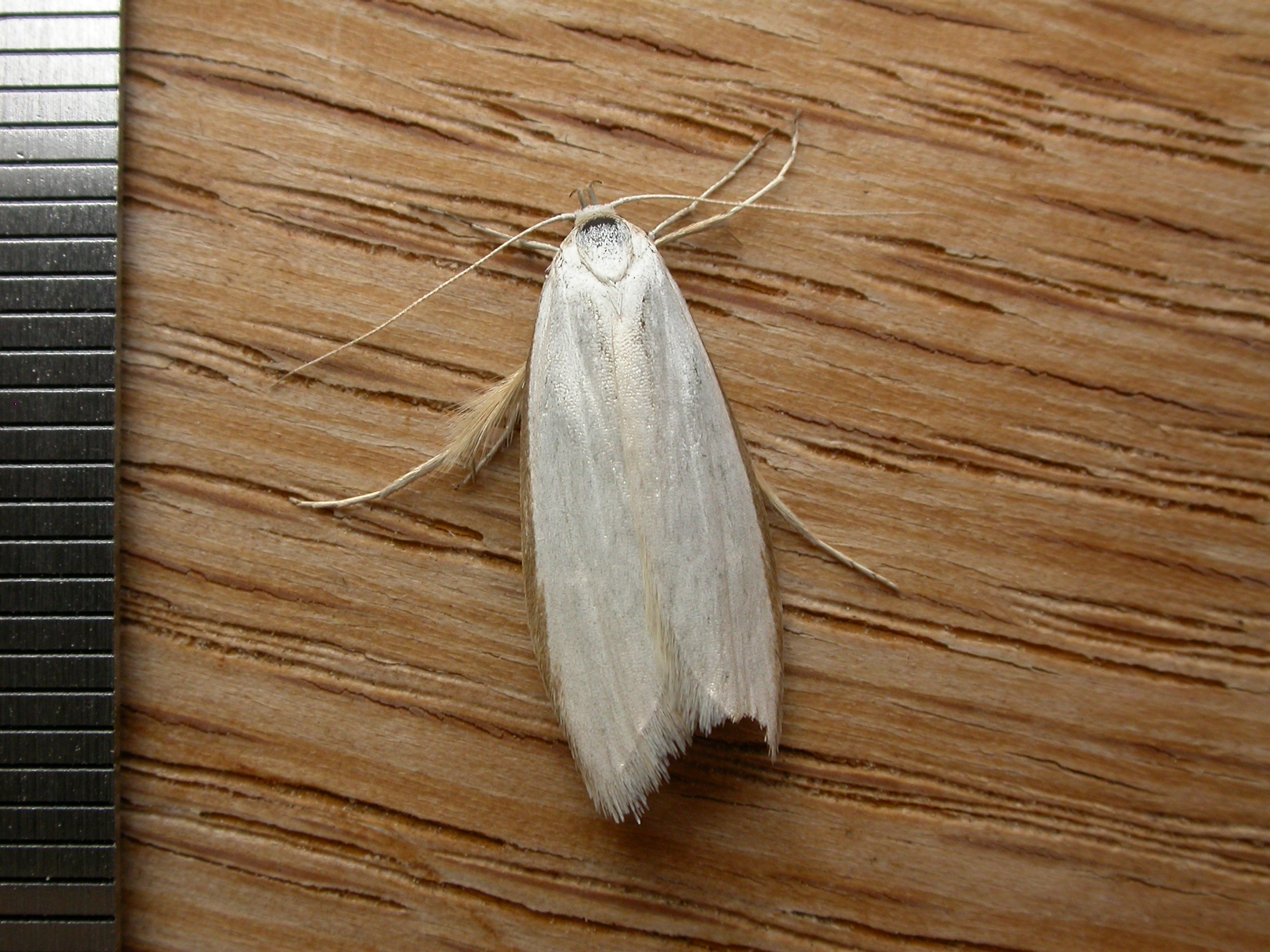
- Zacorus carus

Scientific classification
- Domain: Eukaryota
- Kingdom: Animalia
- Phylum: Arthropoda
- Class: Insecta
- Order: Lepidoptera
- Family: Oecophoridae
- Subfamily: Oecophorinae
- Genus: Zacorus; Butler, 1882

= Zacorus =

Genus of insects

Zacorus is a genus of moths belonging to the family Oecophoridae.

The species of this genus are found in Australia.

Species:

- Zacorus anomodes
- Zacorus carus
