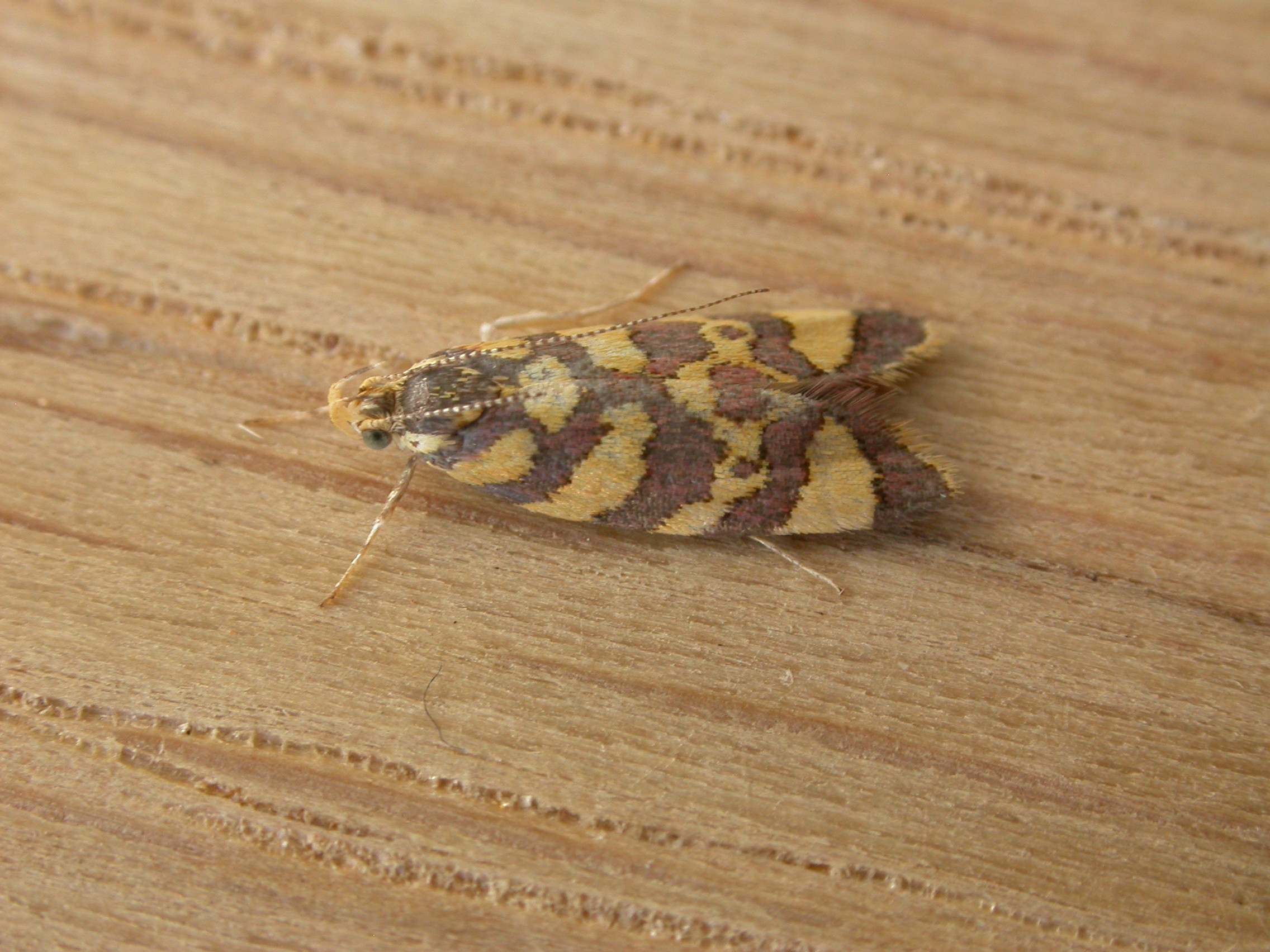
- Tisobarica thyteria

Scientific classification
- Kingdom: Animalia
- Phylum: Arthropoda
- Clade: Pancrustacea
- Class: Insecta
- Order: Lepidoptera
- Family: Oecophoridae
- Subfamily: Oecophorinae
- Genus: Tisobarica; Walker, 1864

Synonyms
- Hieropola Meyrick, 1883

= Tisobarica =

Genus of moth

Tisobarica is a genus of moths of the family Oecophoridae. It occurs in Australia.

== Species ==
There are eight or nine recognized species:

- Tisobarica eranna Turner, 1916
- Tisobarica exquisita Turner, 1946
- Tisobarica habromorpha Lower, 1923
- Tisobarica hedanopa Turner, 1916
- Tisobarica hemigenes (Meyrick, 1889)
- Tisobarica jucundella Walker, 1864
- Tisobarica larotypa Turner, 1916
- Tisobarica pyrrhella (Turner, 1896)
- Tisobarica thyteria (Meyrick, 1889)

The Australian Faunal Directory treats Tisobarica exquisita as a synonym of Tisobarica habromorpha.
