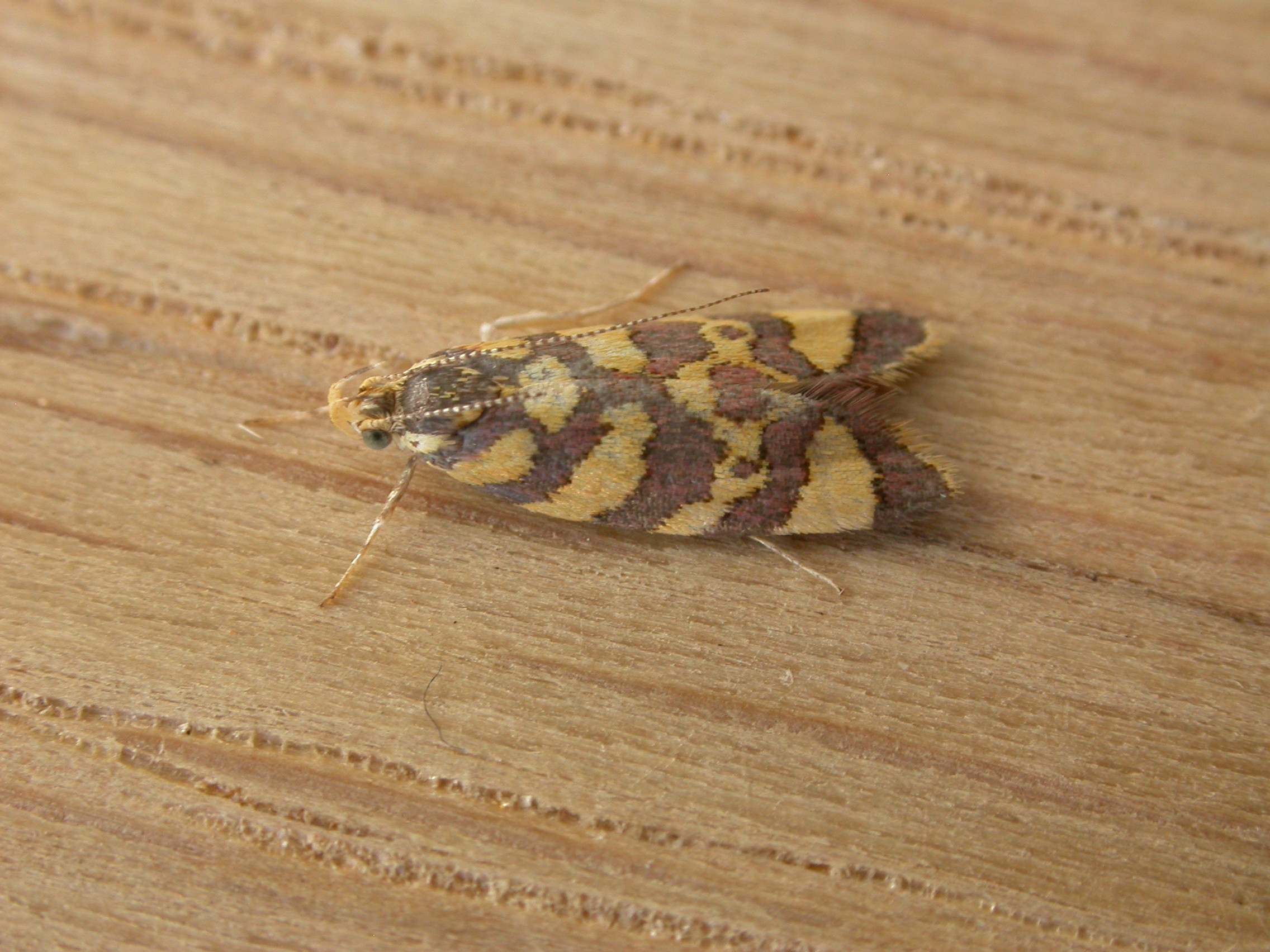

Scientific classification
- Kingdom: Animalia
- Phylum: Arthropoda
- Clade: Pancrustacea
- Class: Insecta
- Order: Lepidoptera
- Family: Oecophoridae
- Genus: Tisobarica
- Species: T. thyteria

Binomial name
- Tisobarica thyteria (Meyrick, 1889)

Synonyms
- Hoplitica thyteria Meyrick, 1889

= Tisobarica thyteria =

Species of moth

Tisobarica thyteria is a species of moth of the family Oecophoridae. It is known from Australia with records from Queensland, New South Wales, Australian Capital Territory, Victoria, and Tasmania.

The wingspan is about 1.5 cm (0.59 in). The forewings are yellow with several dark brown bands that have an iridescent blue shine in living specimens.
