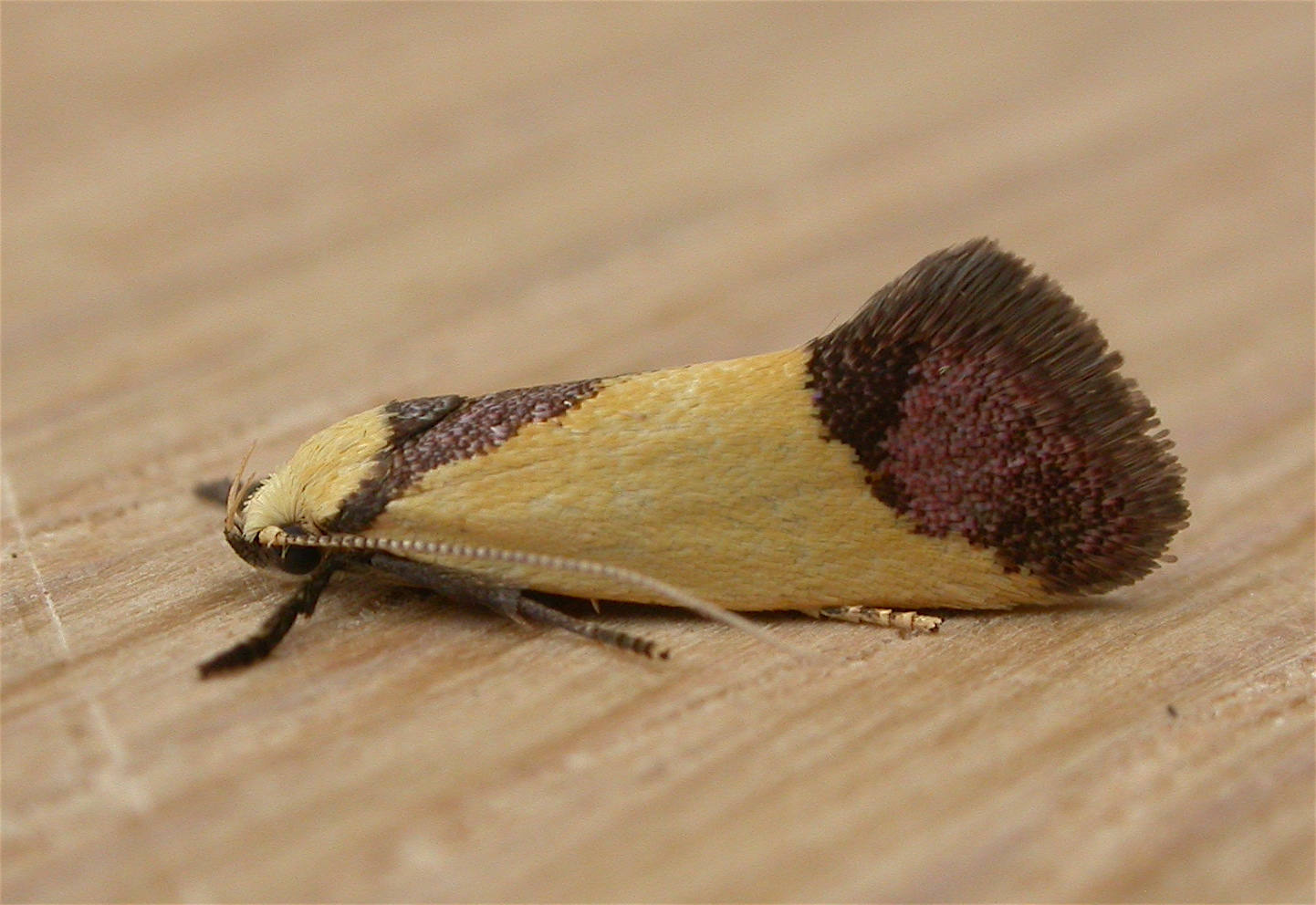

Scientific classification
- Kingdom: Animalia
- Phylum: Arthropoda
- Clade: Pancrustacea
- Class: Insecta
- Order: Lepidoptera
- Family: Oecophoridae
- Genus: Crepidosceles
- Species: C. exanthema

Binomial name
- Crepidosceles exanthema Meyrick, 1885

= Crepidosceles exanthema =

Species of moth

Crepidosceles exanthema is a moth of the family Oecophoridae. It is known from Australia with records from Queensland, New South Wales, the Australian Capital Territory, Victoria, and South Australia.

The wingspan is about 2 cm (0.79 in). This forewings are yellow with broad brown margins, brown areas at their bases, and brown lines along the costae. The hindwings are pearly pale brown.
