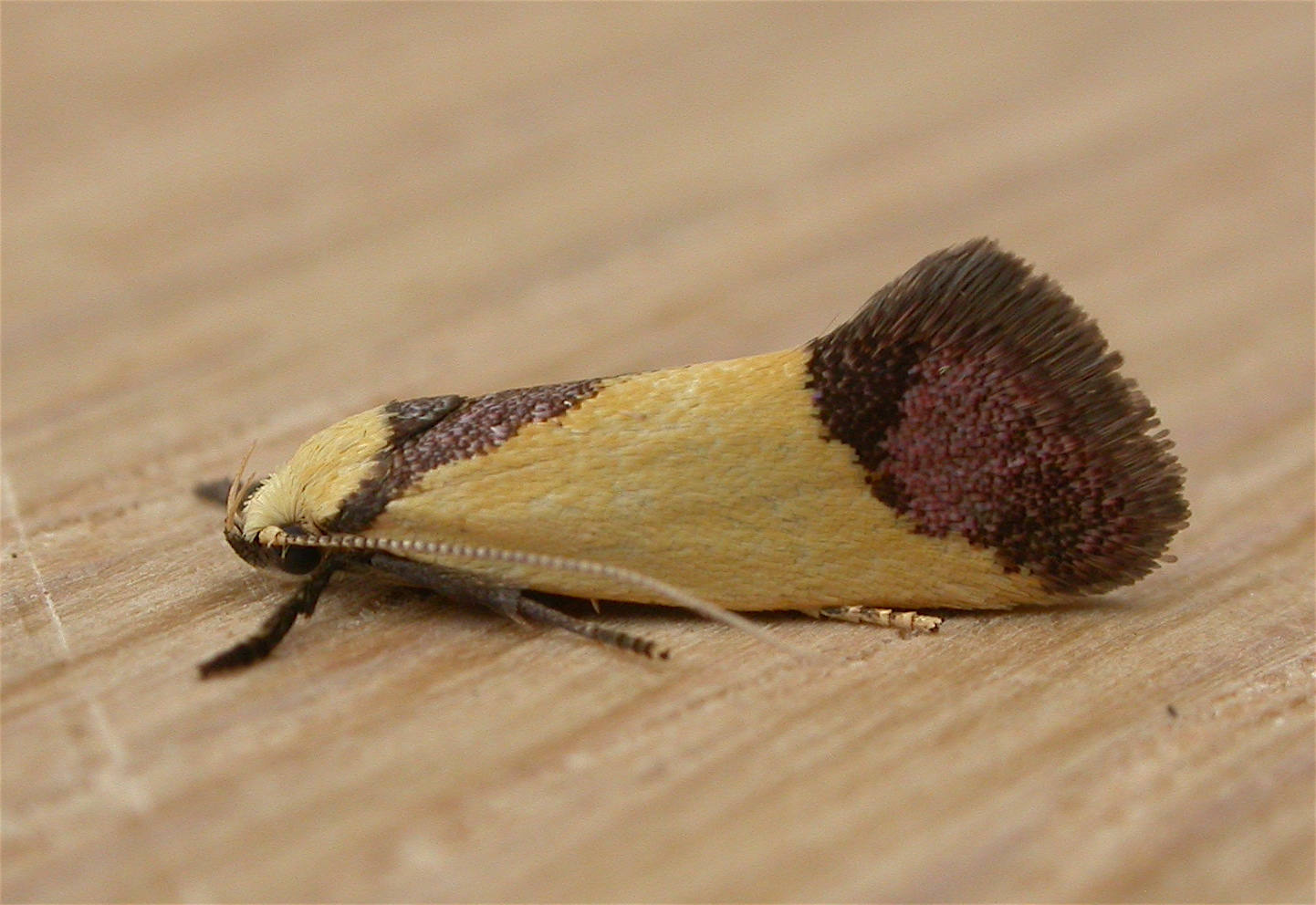
- Crepidosceles exanthema

Scientific classification
- Kingdom: Animalia
- Phylum: Arthropoda
- Clade: Pancrustacea
- Class: Insecta
- Order: Lepidoptera
- Family: Oecophoridae
- Subfamily: Oecophorinae
- Genus: Crepidosceles; Meyrick, 1883

= Crepidosceles =

Genus of moth

Crepidosceles is a genus of moths of the family Oecophoridae. It occurs in Australia.

== Species ==
There are eleven recognized species:

- Crepidosceles argyropis Meyrick, 1902
- Crepidosceles chryscrythra Turner, 1894
- Crepidosceles coeloxantha (Turner, 1944)
- Crepidosceles exanthema Meyrick, 1885
- Crepidosceles glycydora Turner, 1917
- Crepidosceles iostephana Meyrick, 1885
- Crepidosceles leucodetis Meyrick, 1888
- Crepidosceles orthomochla (Turner, 1944)
- Crepidosceles proteis Meyrick, 1888
- Crepidosceles rhodopechys (Turner, 1946)
- Crepidosceles timalphes (Turner, 1917)
