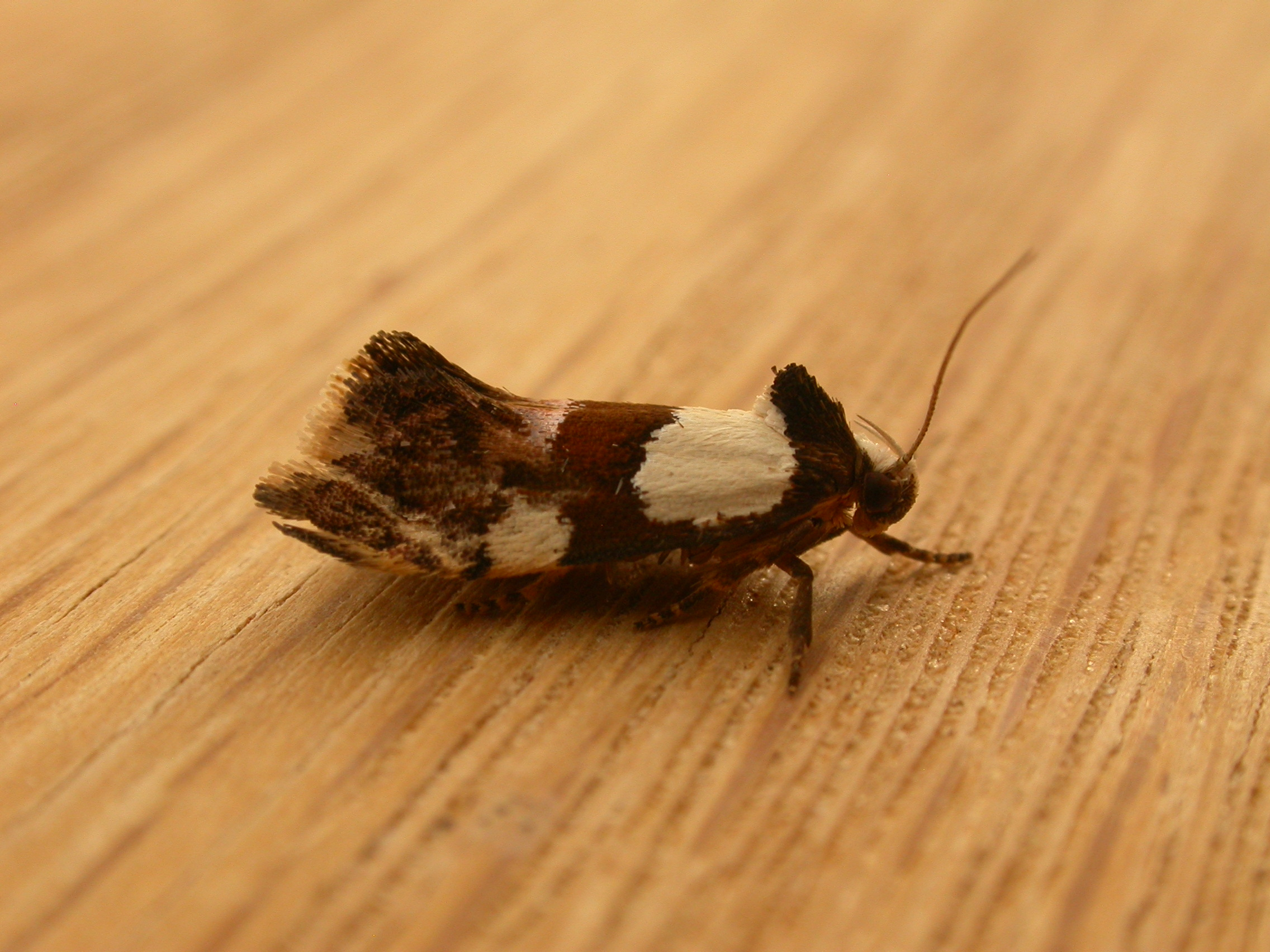
- Placocosma resumptella

Scientific classification
- Kingdom: Animalia
- Phylum: Arthropoda
- Clade: Pancrustacea
- Class: Insecta
- Order: Lepidoptera
- Family: Oecophoridae
- Subfamily: Oecophorinae
- Genus: Placocosma; Meyrick, 1883

Synonyms
- Epipyrga Meyrick, 1883

= Placocosma =

Genus of moths

Placocosma is a genus of moths in the family Oecophoridae. It is known from Australia.

== Species ==
There are six recognized species:

- Placocosma agaclita Meyrick, 1884
- Placocosma anthopetala Meyrick, 1883
- Placocosma gemmaria Meyrick, 1921
- Placocosma hemiphaes Turner, 1917
- Placocosma hephaestea Meyrick, 1883
- Placocosma resumptella (Walker, 1864)
