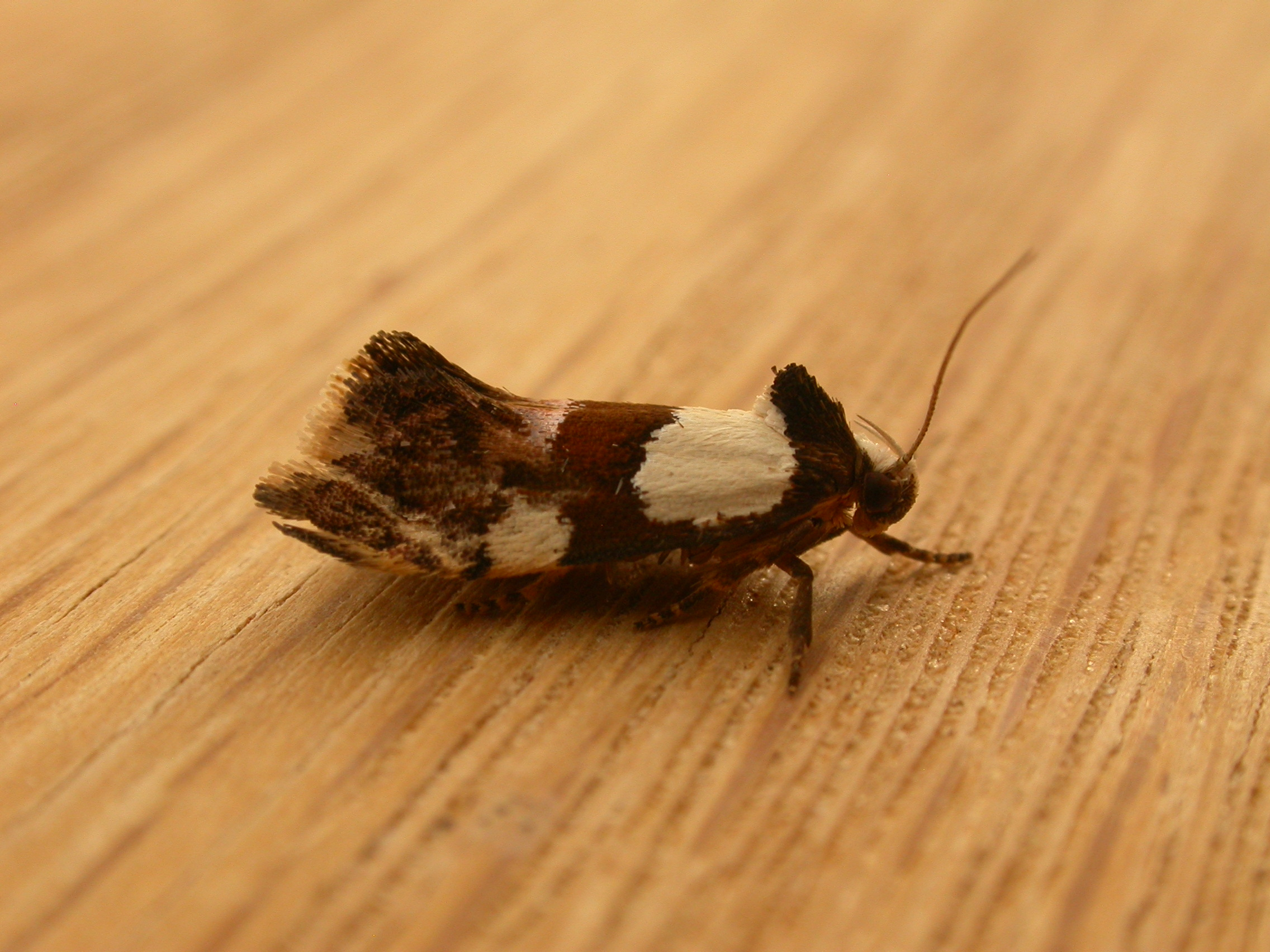

Scientific classification
- Kingdom: Animalia
- Phylum: Arthropoda
- Clade: Pancrustacea
- Class: Insecta
- Order: Lepidoptera
- Family: Oecophoridae
- Genus: Placocosma
- Species: P. resumptella

Binomial name
- Placocosma resumptella (Walker, 1864)

Synonyms
- Oecophora resumptella Walker, 1864; Euphiltra orthozona Lower, 1920

= Placocosma resumptella =

Species of moth

Placocosma resumptella is a moth of the family Oecophoridae. It is found in Australia.

The wingspan is about 2 cm (0.79 in). The forewings are dark brown with white markings.
