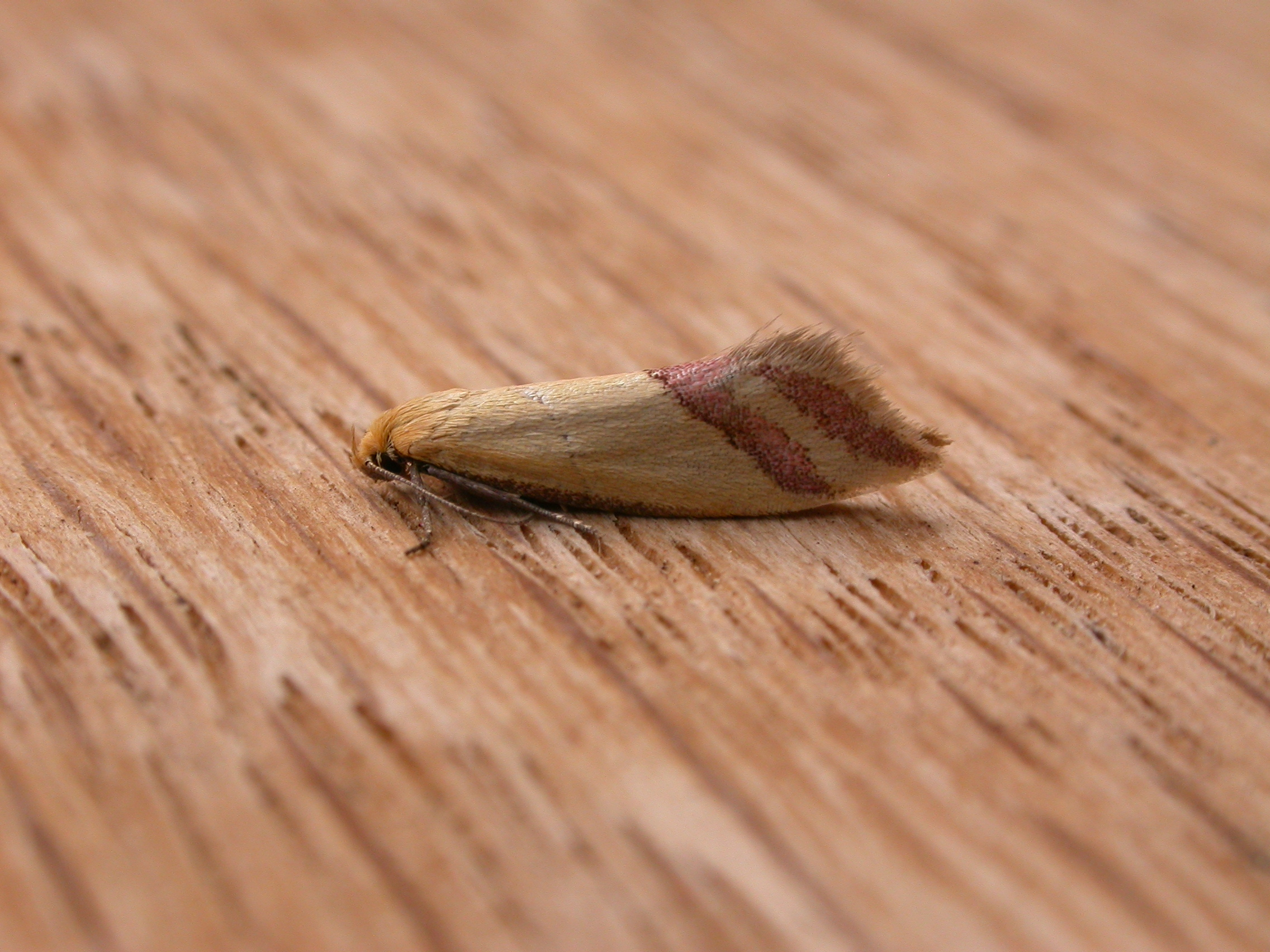
- Coeranica isabella

Scientific classification
- Kingdom: Animalia
- Phylum: Arthropoda
- Clade: Pancrustacea
- Class: Insecta
- Order: Lepidoptera
- Family: Oecophoridae
- Subfamily: Oecophorinae
- Genus: Coeranica; Meyrick, 1883

= Coeranica =

Genus of moth

Coeranica is a small genus of moths of the family Oecophoridae. It occurs in Australia.

== Species ==
There are three recognized species:

- Coeranica eritima Meyrick, 1883
- Coeranica isabella (Newman, 1856)
- Coeranica rhythmosema (Turner, 1940)
