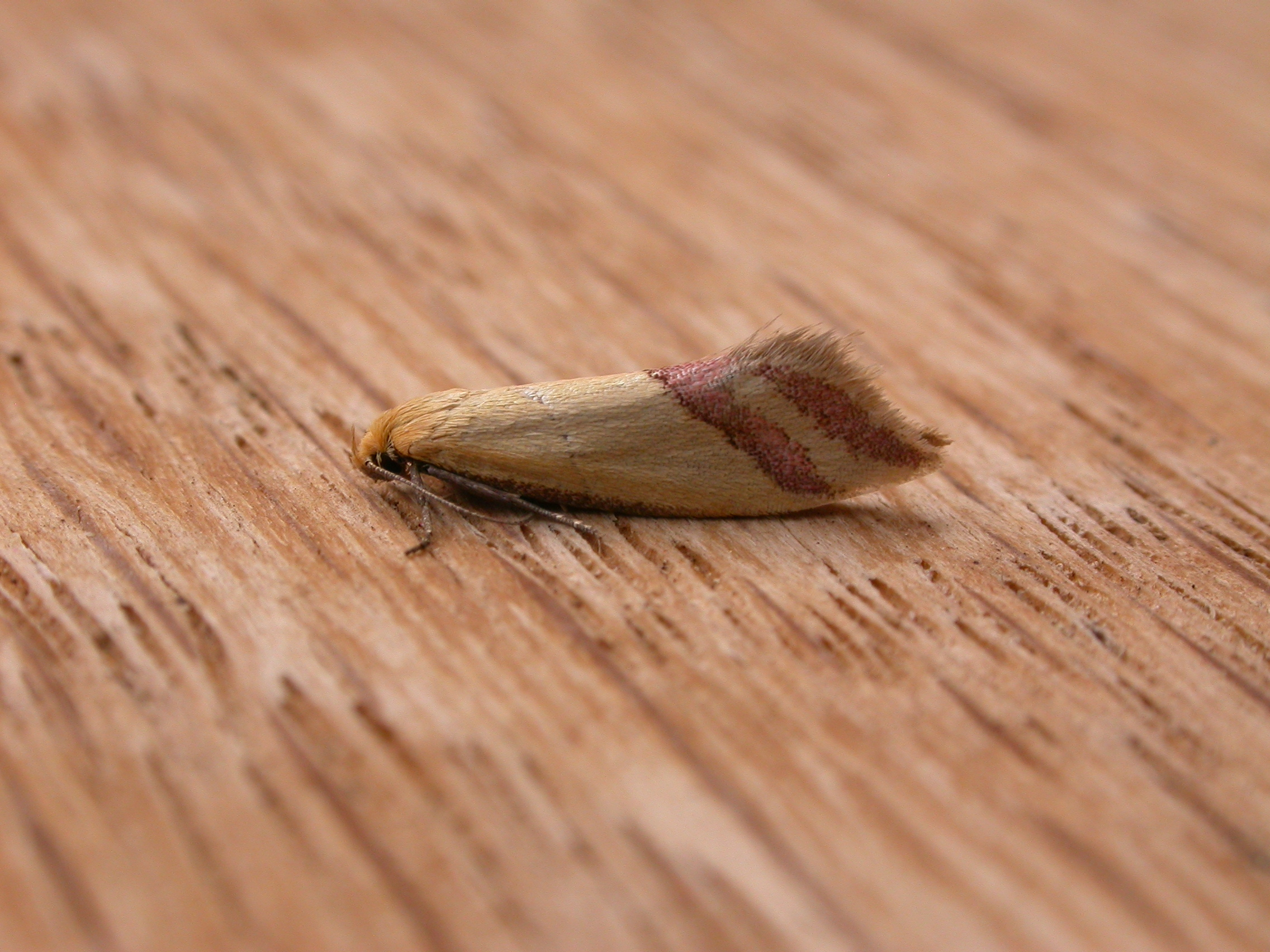

Scientific classification
- Kingdom: Animalia
- Phylum: Arthropoda
- Clade: Pancrustacea
- Class: Insecta
- Order: Lepidoptera
- Family: Oecophoridae
- Genus: Coeranica
- Species: C. isabella

Binomial name
- Coeranica isabella (Newman, 1856)

Synonyms
- Oecophora isabella Newman, 1856

= Coeranica isabella =

Species of moth

Coeranica isabella is a moth of the family Oecophoridae. It is known from Australia with records from Queensland, New South Wales, the Australian Capital Territory, and Victoria.

The wingspan is about 2 cm (0.79 in). The wings are pale brown, with the forewings having two pink stripes along their margins.
