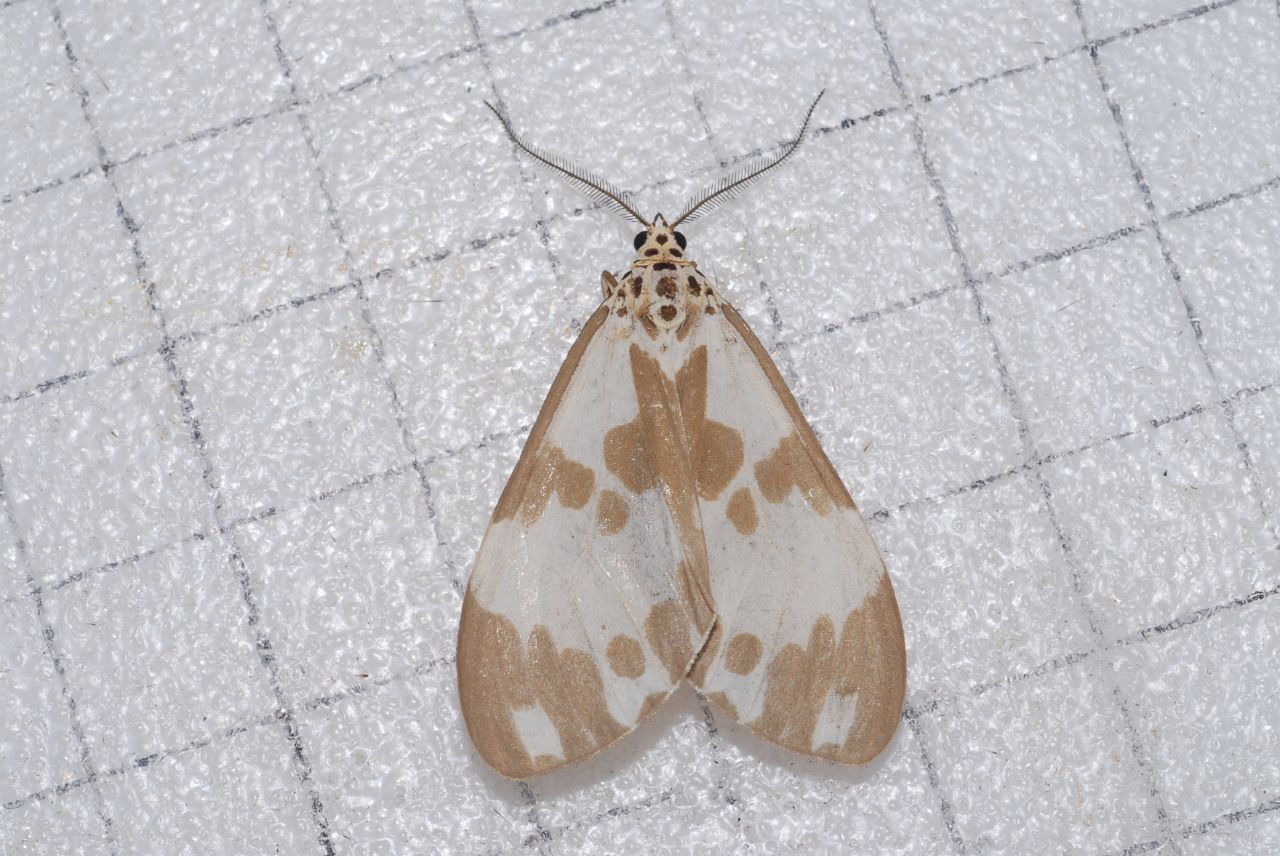

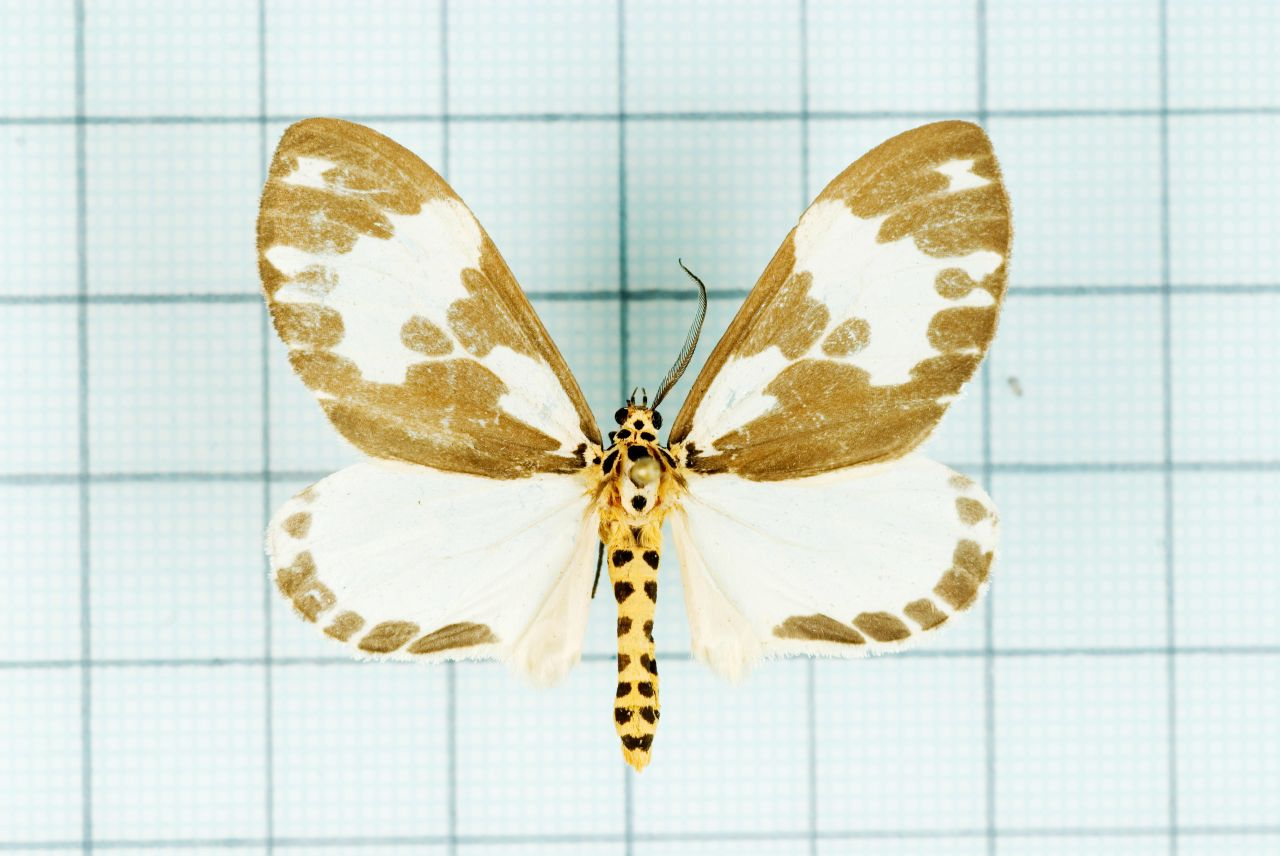

Scientific classification (disputed)
- Domain: Eukaryota
- Kingdom: Animalia
- Phylum: Arthropoda
- Class: Insecta
- Order: Lepidoptera
- Superfamily: Noctuoidea
- Family: Erebidae
- Subfamily: Arctiinae
- Genus: Nyctemera
- Species: N. formosana

Binomial name
- Nyctemera formosana (Swinhoe, 1908)

Synonyms
- Deilemera formosana Swinhoe, 1908; Nyctemera formosana (Swinhoe, 1908); Nyctemera carissima formosana (Swinhoe, 1908); Nyctemera muelleri formosana (Swinhoe, 1908)

= Nyctemera formosana =

Species of moth

Nyctemera formosana is a species of moth in the family Erebidae. It was first described as Deilemera formosana by Charles Swinhoe in 1908. In modern sources, it is variously treated as a valid species, or more often, as a subspecies Nyctemera carissima formosana or Nyctemera muelleri formosana. It is found in Taiwan and the Ryukyu Islands of Japan (Iriomote Island).
