= Marbled white =

Marbled white may refer to:

- Melanargia galathea, a butterfly endemic to Europe, parts of Russia and Southwestern Asia, and Japan
- Hesperocharis graphites, a butterfly endemic to Guatemala and Mexico
- Nyctemera coleta, a moth found in southeast and east Asia
- Nyctemera adversata, a moth found in southeast and east Asia
