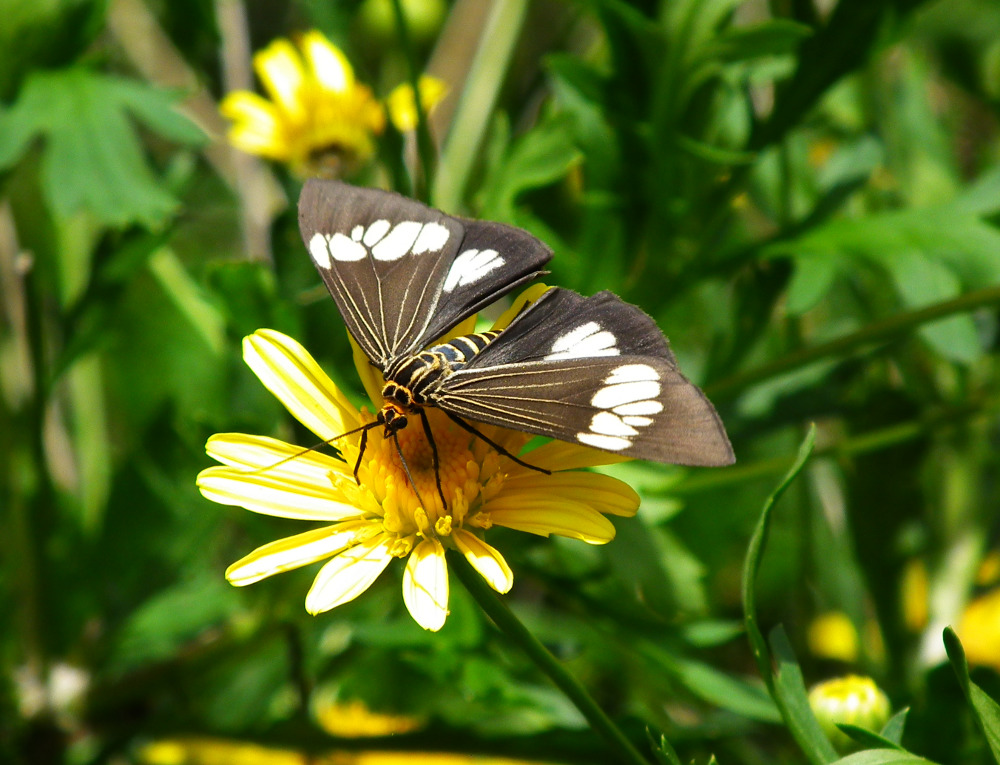
- At Mount Coot-tha, Queensland, Australia
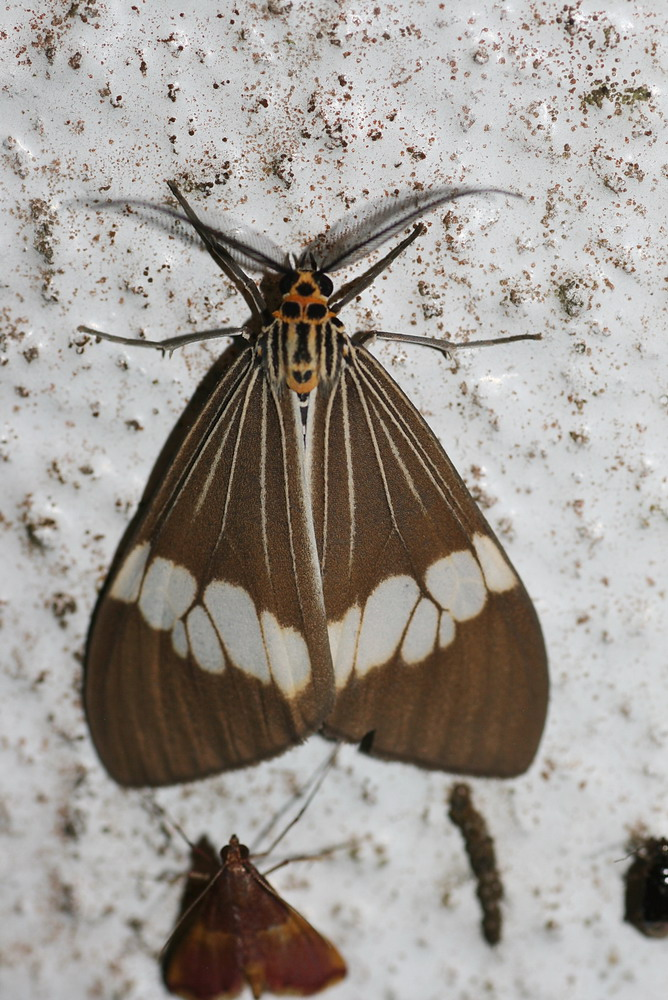
- Nyctemera baulus

Scientific classification
- Kingdom: Animalia
- Phylum: Arthropoda
- Clade: Pancrustacea
- Class: Insecta
- Order: Lepidoptera
- Superfamily: Noctuoidea
- Family: Erebidae
- Subfamily: Arctiinae
- Genus: Nyctemera
- Species: N. baulus

Binomial name
- Nyctemera baulus (Boisduval, 1832)

Synonyms
- Leptosoma baulus Boisduval, 1832; Nyctemera secundiana Lucas, 1892; Deilemera nigrovena Swinhoe, 1903; Leptosoma fasciata Walker, 1856; Nyctemera bipunctata Niewenhuis, 1948; Nyctemera alba Pagenstecher, 1901; Nyctemera albida Pagenstecher, 1901; Nyctemera aluensis Butler, 1887; Deilemera illustris Swinhoe, 1903; Nyctemera fasciata (Walker, 1856); Nyctemera integra Walker, 1866; Deilemera nisa Swinhoe, 1903; Nyctemera mundipicta Walker, 1859; Deilemera mundipicta; Nyctemera moluccana Roepke, 1957; Nyctemera samoensis Tams, 1935; Nyctemera tertiana Meyrick, 1886; Deilemera pullatus D. S. Fletcher, 1957; Deilemera pratti Bethune-Baker, 1904

= Nyctemera baulus =

Species of moth

Nyctemera baulus is a moth of the family Erebidae. It is found from India to Samoa. Records include Queensland, Indonesia and New Guinea.

The wingspan is 45–48 mm. It is a day-flying species.

Larvae have been recorded on Brassica, Emilia, Senecio scandens and Crassocephalum.

== Subspecies ==
- Nyctemera baulus alba Pagenstecher, 1901 (Samoa)
- Nyctemera baulus aluensis Butler, 1887 (Salomon Islands (Alu))
- Nyctemera baulus baulus (Boisduval, 1832) (Buru, Java)
- Nyctemera baulus fasciata Walker, 1856 (New Hebrides)
- Nyctemera baulus integra Walker, 1866 (Philippines)
- Nyctemera baulus nigrovena (Swinhoe, 1903) (Sulawesi)
- Nyctemera baulus nisa (Swinhoe, 1903) (Sangir)
- Nyctemera baulus moluccana Roepke, 1957 (Moluccas)
- Nyctemera baulus mundipicta Walker, 1859 (Malacca, Sumatra, Java)
- Nyctemera baulus samoensis Tams, 1935 (Samoa)
- Nyctemera baulus tertiana Meyrick, 1886 (Australia)
- Nyctemera baulus pratti (Bethune-Baker, 1904) (New Guinea)
- Nyctemera baulus pullatus (D. S. Fletcher, 1957) (Rennell Island)
