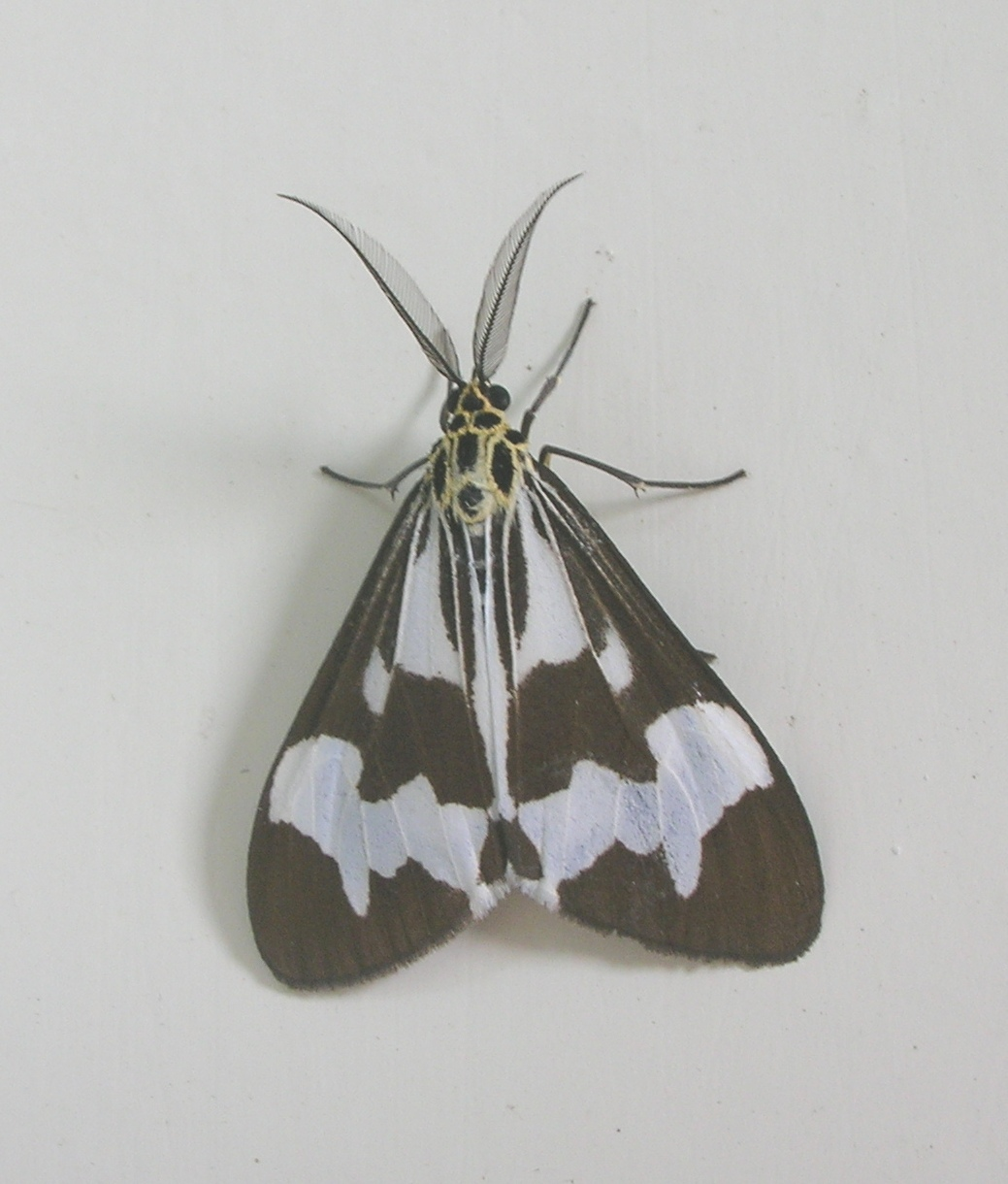

Scientific classification
- Domain: Eukaryota
- Kingdom: Animalia
- Phylum: Arthropoda
- Class: Insecta
- Order: Lepidoptera
- Superfamily: Noctuoidea
- Family: Erebidae
- Subfamily: Arctiinae
- Genus: Nyctemera
- Species: N. luctuosa

Binomial name
- Nyctemera luctuosa (Snellen van Vollenhoven, 1863)

Synonyms
- Leptosoma luctuosum Vollenhoven, 1863; Nyctemera crescens Walker, 1864; Deilemera (Tripheromera) kapaurensis Swinhoe, 1903; Deilemera dinawa Bethune-Baker, 1904; Deilemera dinawa ab. nigripuncta Joicey & Talbot, 1916; Leptosoma galbanum Swinhoe, 1892; Nyctemera luctuosum rostrigera Prout, 1918; Leptosoma onetha Swinhoe, 1901; Nyctemera syrnia Swinhoe, 1903; Deilemera drucei Swinhoe, 1903

= Nyctemera luctuosa =

Species of moth

Nyctemera luctuosa is a moth of the family Erebidae first described by Samuel Constantinus Snellen van Vollenhoven in 1863. It is found in Papua New Guinea, Australia and the Philippines. The habitat consists of mountainous areas. This is a day-flying species.

The larvae feed on various plants, including Senecio scandens.

== Subspecies ==
- Nyctemera luctuosa luctuosa (Batjan)
- Nyctemera luctuosa drucei (Swinhoe, 1903) (New Guinea, New Hebrides, Australia)
- Nyctemera luctuosa galbana (Swinhoe, 1892) (Sebu)
- Nyctemera luctuosa instructa Walker, 1864 (New Guinea)
- Nyctemera luctuosa onetha (Swinhoe, 1901) (New Britain)
- Nyctemera luctuosa syrnia (Swinhoe, 1903) (Fergusson Islands)
