= L. flavescens =

L. flavescens may refer to:

- Laphria flavescens, a bee-like robber fly
- Larinus flavescens, a true weevil
- Lasius flavescens, a formicine ant
- Leptosoma flavescens, an Asian moth
- Leptospermum flavescens, a shrub native to eastern Australia
- Leucocoprinus flavescens, a basidiomycete fungus
- Leymus flavescens, a true grass
- Lichenostomus flavescens, an Oceanian bird
- Lineus flavescens, a nemertine worm
- Liothrips flavescens, a storm fly
- Lipogramma flavescens, a basslet native to the western Atlantic Ocean
- Lithophyllum flavescens, a thalloid algae
- Lithothamnion flavescens, a red algae
- Litoria flavescens, a frog endemic to Papua New Guinea
- Litsea flavescens, an evergreen native to North America
- Lycoris flavescens, a flowering plant
