= Nyctemera lugens =

Scientific classification
- Domain: Eukaryota
- Kingdom: Animalia
- Phylum: Arthropoda
- Class: Insecta
- Order: Lepidoptera
- Superfamily: Noctuoidea
- Family: Erebidae
- Subfamily: Arctiinae
- Genus: Nyctemera
- Species: N. lugens

Binomial name
- Nyctemera lugens Roepke, 1949

Species of moth

Nyctemera lugens is a moth of the family Erebidae first described by Walter Karl Johann Roepke in 1949. It is found on Sulawesi in Indonesia.
