= Nyctemera mastrigti =

Scientific classification
- Kingdom: Animalia
- Phylum: Arthropoda
- Class: Insecta
- Order: Lepidoptera
- Superfamily: Noctuoidea
- Family: Erebidae
- Subfamily: Arctiinae
- Genus: Nyctemera
- Species: N. mastrigti

Binomial name
- Nyctemera mastrigti De Vos, 1996

Species of moth

Nyctemera mastrigti is a moth of the family Erebidae first described by Rob de Vos in 1996. It is found in New Guinea and Papua New Guinea.

The moth has brown and white markings on its wings, with a medium wingspan.
