= Nyctemera pseudokala =

Scientific classification
- Domain: Eukaryota
- Kingdom: Animalia
- Phylum: Arthropoda
- Class: Insecta
- Order: Lepidoptera
- Superfamily: Noctuoidea
- Family: Erebidae
- Subfamily: Arctiinae
- Genus: Nyctemera
- Species: N. pseudokala

Binomial name
- Nyctemera pseudokala de Vos, 1996

Species of moth

Nyctemera pseudokala is a moth of the family Erebidae first described by Rob de Vos in 1996. It is found on Buru in Indonesia.
