= Nyctemera luzonensis =

Scientific classification
- Domain: Eukaryota
- Kingdom: Animalia
- Phylum: Arthropoda
- Class: Insecta
- Order: Lepidoptera
- Superfamily: Noctuoidea
- Family: Erebidae
- Subfamily: Arctiinae
- Genus: Nyctemera
- Species: N. luzonensis

Binomial name
- Nyctemera luzonensis (Wileman, 1915)

Synonyms
- Deilemera luzonensis Wileman, 1915; Deilemera arctata luzonensis

Species of moth

Nyctemera luzonensis is a moth of the family Erebidae first described by Alfred Ernest Wileman in 1915. It is found on Luzon in the Philippines.

== Subspecies ==
- Nyctemera luzonensis luzonensis (Philippines: northern Luzon)
- Nyctemera luzonensis squalida De Vos & Černý, 1999 (Philippines: southern Luzon)
