= Nyctemera calcicola =

Scientific classification
- Kingdom: Animalia
- Phylum: Arthropoda
- Clade: Pancrustacea
- Class: Insecta
- Order: Lepidoptera
- Superfamily: Noctuoidea
- Family: Erebidae
- Subfamily: Arctiinae
- Genus: Nyctemera
- Species: N. calcicola

Binomial name
- Nyctemera calcicola Holloway, 1988

Species of moth

Nyctemera calcicola is a moth of the family Erebidae first described by Jeremy Daniel Holloway in 1988. It is found on Borneo. The habitat consists of upper montane forest on limestone.

The length of the forewings is 23–25 mm and the forewings are black.

The larvae possibly feed on Senecio species.
