= Nyctemera kinibalina =

Scientific classification
- Kingdom: Animalia
- Phylum: Arthropoda
- Class: Insecta
- Order: Lepidoptera
- Superfamily: Noctuoidea
- Family: Erebidae
- Subfamily: Arctiinae
- Genus: Nyctemera
- Species: N. kinibalina

Binomial name
- Nyctemera kinibalina Snellen, 1899

Synonyms
- Nyctemer kinibalina

Species of moth

Nyctemera kinibalina is a moth of the family Erebidae first described by Snellen in 1899. It is found on Borneo.
