= Nyctemera latistriga =

Scientific classification
- Kingdom: Animalia
- Phylum: Arthropoda
- Class: Insecta
- Order: Lepidoptera
- Superfamily: Noctuoidea
- Family: Erebidae
- Subfamily: Arctiinae
- Genus: Nyctemera
- Species: N. latistriga

Binomial name
- Nyctemera latistriga Walker, 1854

Synonyms
- Leptosoma inconstans Snellen van Vollenhoven, 1863; Leptosoma leucostigma Snellen van Vollenhoven, 1863; Leptosoma nubecula Snellen van Vollenhoven, 1863; Leptosoma pallens Snellen von Vollenhoven, 1863; Leptosoma flavescens Snellen van Vollenhoven, 1863; Tanada amplificata Walker, 1865; Deilemera ovada Swinhoe, 1903; Nyctemera latistriga negritorum Seitz, 1915; Nyctemera latistriga f. negritorum Bryk, 1937

Species of moth

Nyctemera latistriga is a moth of the family Erebidae first described by Francis Walker in 1854. It is found from the Oriental tropics of India, Sri Lanka, Myanmar, Andaman Islands, Sumatra, Borneo to the Philippines and Lombok.

== Description ==
Adults are day flying. Differs from Nyctemera lacticinia in having the broad white streak on base of inner margin of forewing replaced by narrow streaks on costa, vein 1, and innermargin and by a very broad streak below he median nervure. The postmedial band of spots with the upper two conjoined. The fourth is very large and fifth absent.
