= Nyctemera herklotsii =

Scientific classification
- Domain: Eukaryota
- Kingdom: Animalia
- Phylum: Arthropoda
- Class: Insecta
- Order: Lepidoptera
- Superfamily: Noctuoidea
- Family: Erebidae
- Subfamily: Arctiinae
- Genus: Nyctemera
- Species: N. herklotsii

Binomial name
- Nyctemera herklotsii (Vollenhoven, 1863)

Synonyms
- Leptosoma herklotsii Vollenhoven, 1863; Leptosoma quadriguttatum Vollenhoven, 1863; Nyctemera sexmaculata Seitz, 1915

Species of moth

Nyctemera herklotsii is a moth of the family Erebidae first described by Vollenhoven in 1863. It is found on Java in Indonesia.
