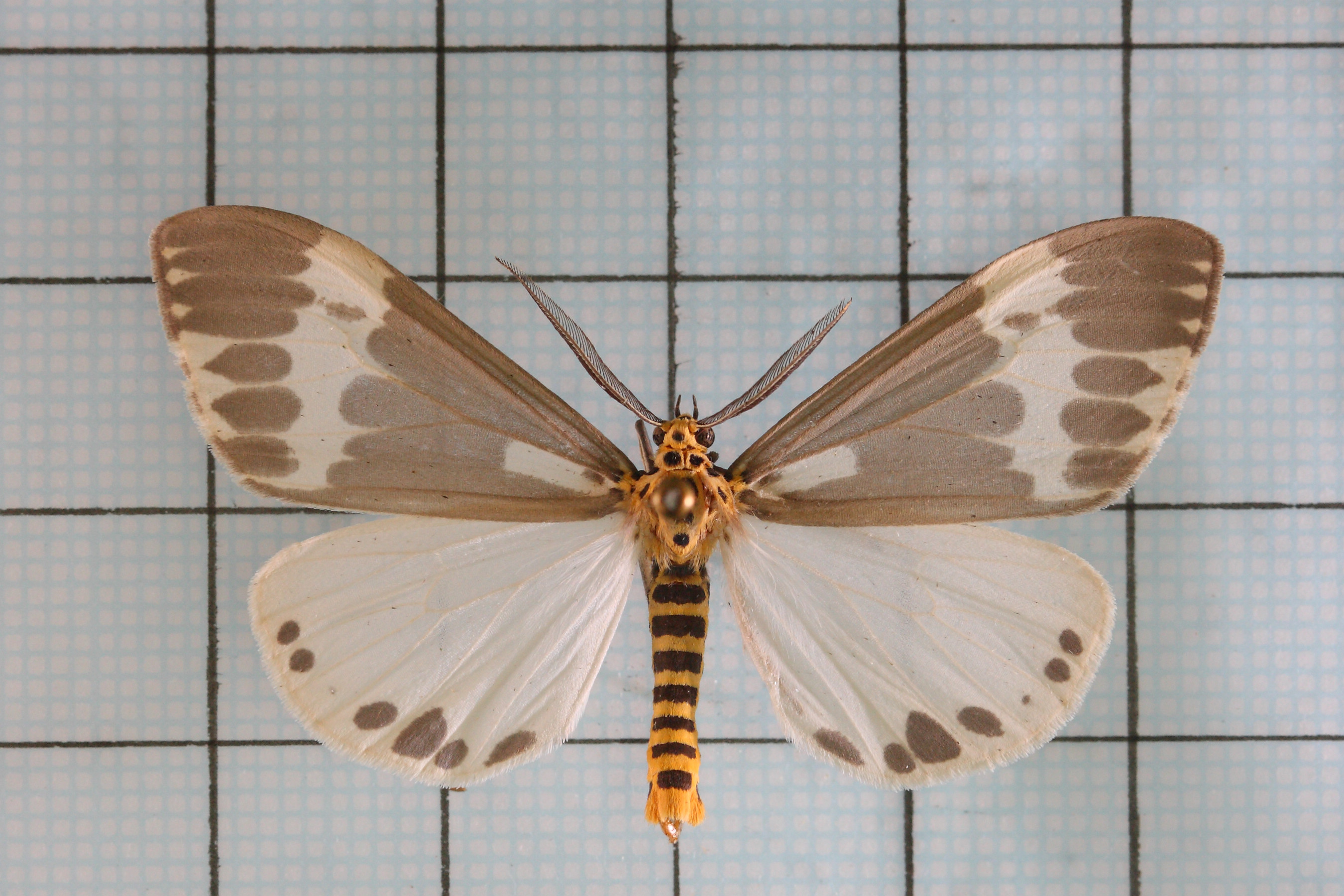

Scientific classification
- Kingdom: Animalia
- Phylum: Arthropoda
- Class: Insecta
- Order: Lepidoptera
- Superfamily: Noctuoidea
- Family: Erebidae
- Subfamily: Arctiinae
- Genus: Nyctemera
- Species: N. dentifascia

Binomial name
- Nyctemera dentifascia Snellen, 1898

Synonyms
- Nyctemera biserrata Seitz, 1915; Deilemera abraxina Rothschild, 1920; Deilemera personata Talbot, 1929

= Nyctemera dentifascia =

Species of moth

Nyctemera dentifascia is a moth of the family Erebidae first described by Snellen in 1898. It is found on Sumatra.
