= Nyctemera kala =

Scientific classification
- Kingdom: Animalia
- Phylum: Arthropoda
- Class: Insecta
- Order: Lepidoptera
- Superfamily: Noctuoidea
- Family: Erebidae
- Subfamily: Arctiinae
- Genus: Nyctemera
- Species: N. kala

Binomial name
- Nyctemera kala (C. Swinhoe, 1892)

Synonyms
- Leptosoma kala C. Swinhoe, 1892

Species of moth

Nyctemera kala is a moth of the family Erebidae first described by Charles Swinhoe in 1892. It is found on the Key Islands of Indonesia.
