= Nyctemera simulatrix =

Scientific classification
- Kingdom: Animalia
- Phylum: Arthropoda
- Class: Insecta
- Order: Lepidoptera
- Superfamily: Noctuoidea
- Family: Erebidae
- Subfamily: Arctiinae
- Genus: Nyctemera
- Species: N. simulatrix

Binomial name
- Nyctemera simulatrix Walker, 1864

Synonyms
- Leptosoma consobrina Hopffer, 1874; Leptosoma accepta Swinhoe, 1892

Species of insect

Nyctemera simulatrix is a moth of the family Erebidae first described by Francis Walker in 1864. It is found on Sulawesi, Flores, Bangai and the Key Islands.

== Subspecies ==
- Nyctemera simulatrix simulatrix (central and south-western Sulawesi, Flores)
- Nyctemera simulatrix basinigra Niewenhuis, 1948 (south-eastern Sulawesi, Bangai)
- Nyctemera simulatrix consobrina (Hopffer, 1874) (Sulawesi: eastern Minahassa Peninsula)
