= Nyctemera gerra =

Scientific classification
- Domain: Eukaryota
- Kingdom: Animalia
- Phylum: Arthropoda
- Class: Insecta
- Order: Lepidoptera
- Superfamily: Noctuoidea
- Family: Erebidae
- Subfamily: Arctiinae
- Genus: Nyctemera
- Species: N. gerra

Binomial name
- Nyctemera gerra (C. Swinhoe, 1903)

Synonyms
- Deilemera gerra C. Swinhoe, 1903; Deilemera leuctra C. Swinhoe, 1903; Nyctemera aeres vandenberghi Roepke, 1957

Species of moth

Nyctemera gerra is a moth of the family Erebidae first described by Charles Swinhoe in 1903. It is found on Sulawesi, the Sangihe Islands, the Talaud Islands, the Philippines and Sanana Island.
