= Nyctemera evergista =

Scientific classification
- Domain: Eukaryota
- Kingdom: Animalia
- Phylum: Arthropoda
- Class: Insecta
- Order: Lepidoptera
- Superfamily: Noctuoidea
- Family: Erebidae
- Subfamily: Arctiinae
- Genus: Nyctemera
- Species: N. evergista

Binomial name
- Nyctemera evergista (Stoll, [1781])

Synonyms
- Phalaena evergista Stoll, [1781]; Leptosoma aeres Boisduval, 1832; Nyctemera intercisa Walker, 1864; Nyctemera mutabilis Walker, 1864; Leptosoma agagles Boisduval, 1832; Deilemera uniplaga Swinhoe, 1903

Species of moth

Nyctemera evergista is a moth of the family Erebidae first described by Stoll in 1781. It is found on the Moluccas, Seram, Buru and in New Guinea.

== Subspecies ==
- Nyctemera evergista evergista (Seram, Buru, Moluccas: Ambon, Lease Island)
- Nyctemera evergista agagles (Boisduval, 1932) (Irian-Jaya)
- Nyctemera evergista bismarckiana de Vos, 2002 (Papua New Guinea, Bismarck Archipelago, New Britain, New Ireland, New Hanover, Umboi Island)
- Nyctemera evergista uniplaga (Swinhoe, 1903) (north-eastern Irian Jaya, Papua New Guinea to Milne Bay, D'Entrecasteaux Islands)
