= Nyctemera latimargo =

Scientific classification
- Domain: Eukaryota
- Kingdom: Animalia
- Phylum: Arthropoda
- Class: Insecta
- Order: Lepidoptera
- Superfamily: Noctuoidea
- Family: Erebidae
- Subfamily: Arctiinae
- Genus: Nyctemera
- Species: N. latimargo

Binomial name
- Nyctemera latimargo (Rothschild, 1915)

Synonyms
- Deilemera absurdum latimargo Rothschild, 1915

Species of moth

Nyctemera latimargo is a moth of the family Erebidae. It is found in Papua, where it has been recorded from the Snow Mountains and the Baliem Valley. It is found at altitudes ranging from sea level to 2,100 meters.

The length of the forewings is 20–21 mm.
