= Nyctemera kinabaluensis =

Scientific classification
- Domain: Eukaryota
- Kingdom: Animalia
- Phylum: Arthropoda
- Class: Insecta
- Order: Lepidoptera
- Superfamily: Noctuoidea
- Family: Erebidae
- Subfamily: Arctiinae
- Genus: Nyctemera
- Species: N. kinabaluensis

Binomial name
- Nyctemera kinabaluensis Reich, 1932

Synonyms
- Nyctemera arctata kinabaluensis Reich, 1932

Species of moth

Nyctemera kinabaluensis is a moth of the family Erebidae first described by Reich in 1932. It is found on Borneo.
