= Nyctemera undulata =

Scientific classification
- Domain: Eukaryota
- Kingdom: Animalia
- Phylum: Arthropoda
- Class: Insecta
- Order: Lepidoptera
- Superfamily: Noctuoidea
- Family: Erebidae
- Subfamily: Arctiinae
- Genus: Nyctemera
- Species: N. undulata

Binomial name
- Nyctemera undulata De Vos & Černý, 1999

Species of moth

Nyctemera undulata is a moth of the family Erebidae first described by Rob de Vos and Karel Černý in 1999. It is found on Mindanao in the Philippines.
