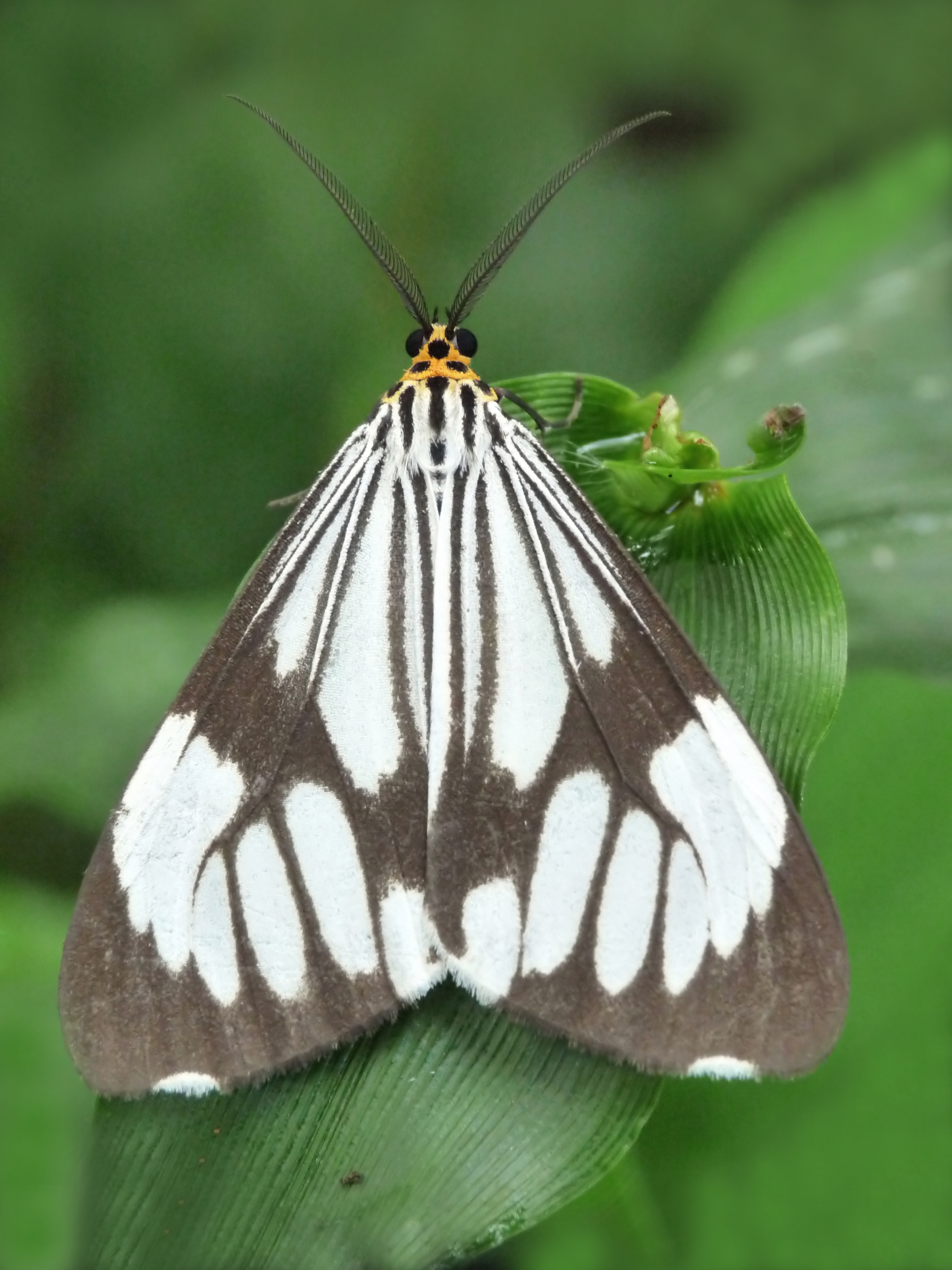
- In Kerala, India
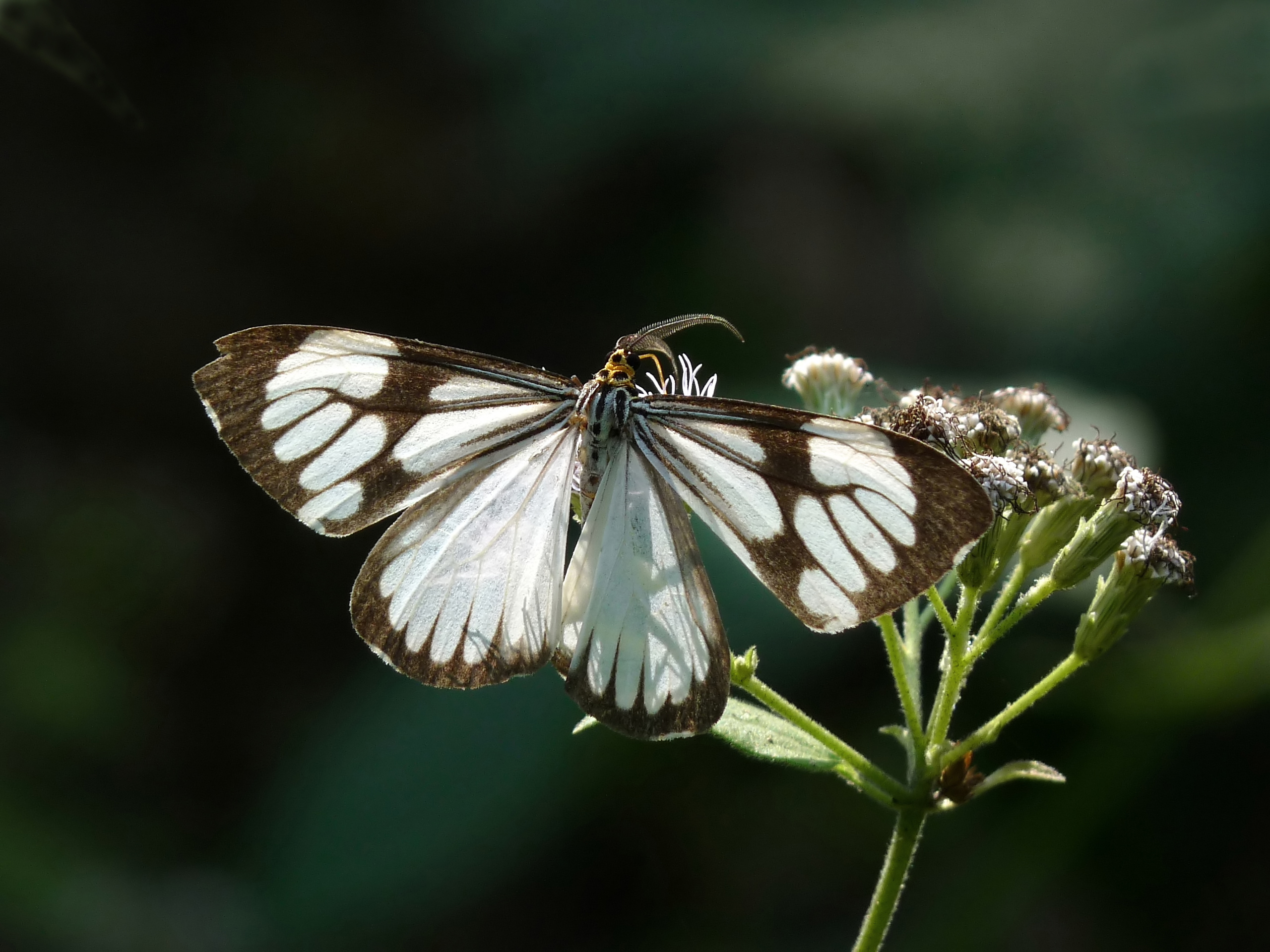

Scientific classification
- Kingdom: Animalia
- Phylum: Arthropoda
- Clade: Pancrustacea
- Class: Insecta
- Order: Lepidoptera
- Superfamily: Noctuoidea
- Family: Erebidae
- Subfamily: Arctiinae
- Genus: Nyctemera
- Species: N. coleta

Binomial name
- Nyctemera coleta (Stoll, 1782)

Synonyms
- Phalaena coleta Stoll, 1782; Nyctemera nigrovenosa Moore, 1879

= Nyctemera coleta =

Species of moth

Nyctemera coleta, the marbled white moth or white tiger moth, is a moth found from India to the Philippines, and from Japan to Papua New Guinea. It is classified under the subgenus Coleta of the genus Nyctemera in the family Arctiidae. The species was first described by Caspar Stoll in 1782. It contains four subspecies.

== Description ==
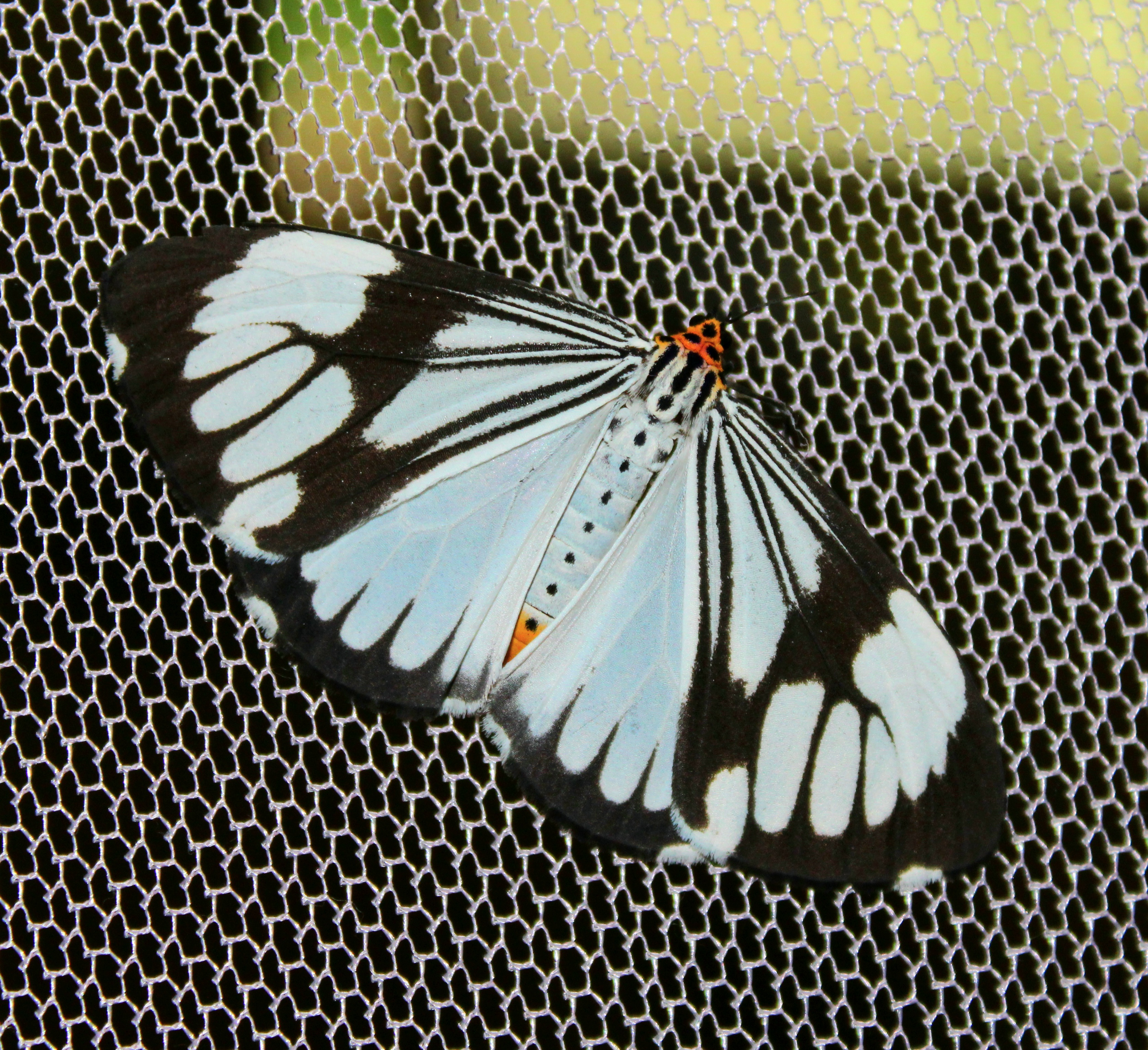
from Sri Lanka

The male has a large tuft of hair arising from the base of the tibia of the foreleg. It differs from Nyctemera tripunctaria in the lower three spots of the post-medial band of forewing being separated and having another spot below them towards outer angle. Cilia white below the apex and at outer angle. Hindwing with the cilia white below the apex, and in most specimens at anal angle. The Sri Lankan subspecies has black veins 3 and 4 of hindwing and the spots of the postmedial band of forewing are smaller than other subspecies.

The larvae are purplish and hairy. Anterior somites yellowish. Each somite is black and marked with short dorsal and lateral white streaks. Pupa yellowish and spotted with black.

== Subspecies ==
- Nyctemera coleta coleta (Malacca, Singapore, Sumatra, Java)
- Nyctemera coleta melaneura (Butler, 1883) (Nias)
- Nyctemera coleta melas Röber, 1891 (Seram, Bangai, Moluccas)
- Nyctemera coleta nigrovenosa Moore, 1879 (Sri Lanka)
