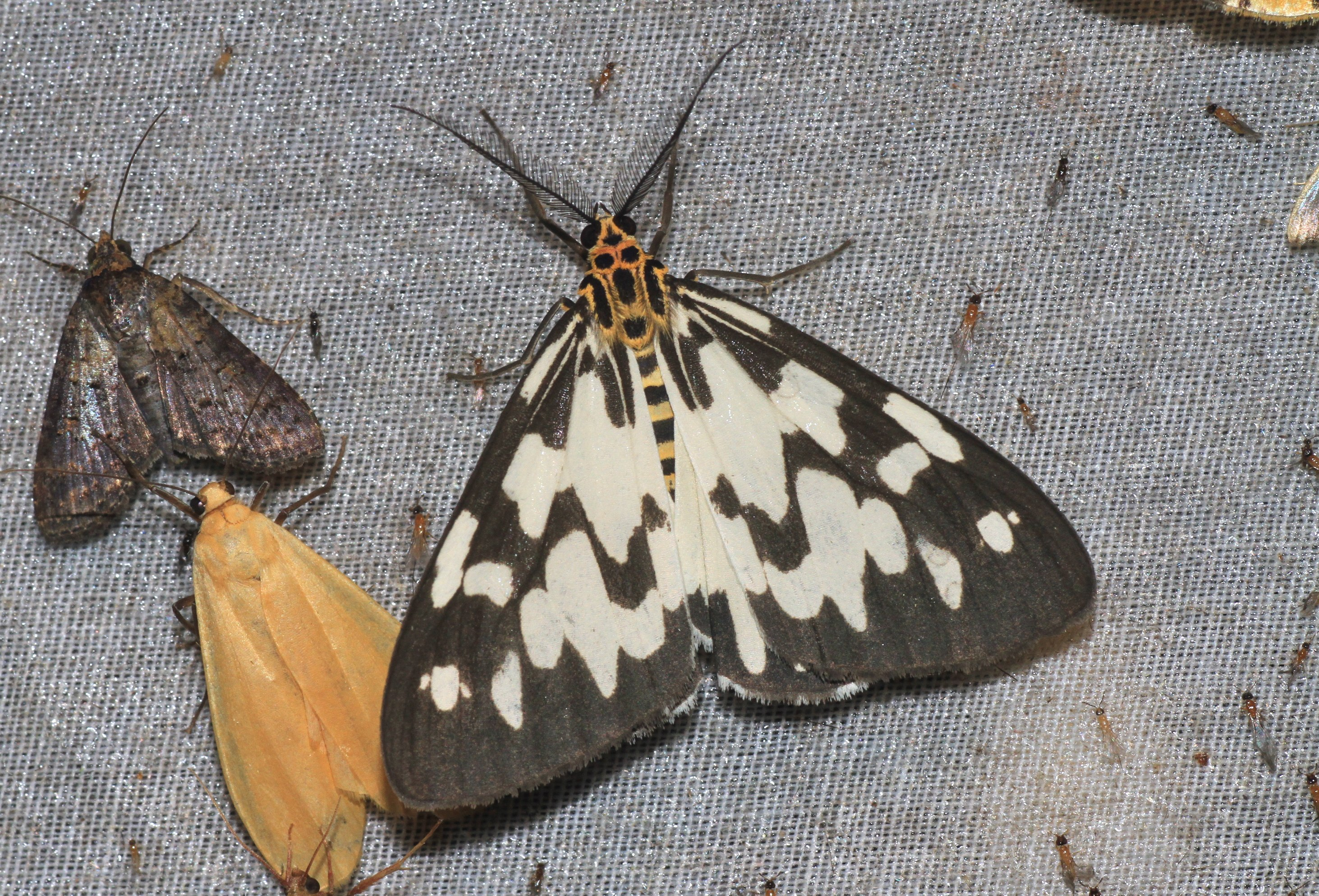

Scientific classification
- Domain: Eukaryota
- Kingdom: Animalia
- Phylum: Arthropoda
- Class: Insecta
- Order: Lepidoptera
- Superfamily: Noctuoidea
- Family: Erebidae
- Subfamily: Arctiinae
- Genus: Nyctemera
- Species: N. ludekingii

Binomial name
- Nyctemera ludekingii (Vollenhoven, 1863)

Synonyms
- Leptosoma ludekingii Vollenhoven, 1863; Nyctemera variegata Reich, 1932

= Nyctemera ludekingii =

Species of moth

Nyctemera ludekingii is a moth of the family Erebidae first described by Vollenhoven in 1863. It is found on Sumatra and Borneo.

Adults are day-flying.
