= Nyctemera genora =

Scientific classification
- Domain: Eukaryota
- Kingdom: Animalia
- Phylum: Arthropoda
- Class: Insecta
- Order: Lepidoptera
- Superfamily: Noctuoidea
- Family: Erebidae
- Subfamily: Arctiinae
- Genus: Nyctemera
- Species: N. genora

Binomial name
- Nyctemera genora C. Swinhoe, 1917

Species of moth

Nyctemera genora is a moth of the family Erebidae first described by Charles Swinhoe in 1917. It is found on New Guinea.
