= Nyctemera biformis =

Scientific classification
- Kingdom: Animalia
- Phylum: Arthropoda
- Class: Insecta
- Order: Lepidoptera
- Superfamily: Noctuoidea
- Family: Erebidae
- Subfamily: Arctiinae
- Genus: Nyctemera
- Species: N. biformis

Binomial name
- Nyctemera biformis (Mabille, 1878)

Synonyms
- Xylecata biformis (Mabille, 1878); Leptosoma mabillei Butler, 1882; Nyctemera infumata Oberthür, 1916

Species of moth

Nyctemera biformis is a moth of the subfamily Arctiinae. It was described by Jules Paul Mabille in 1878 or 1879. Some sources place it in subgenus Xylecata, which may also be treated as a genus.

Nyctemera biformis is endemic to Madagascar.
