= Nyctemera toxopei =

Scientific classification
- Domain: Eukaryota
- Kingdom: Animalia
- Phylum: Arthropoda
- Class: Insecta
- Order: Lepidoptera
- Superfamily: Noctuoidea
- Family: Erebidae
- Subfamily: Arctiinae
- Genus: Nyctemera
- Species: N. toxopei

Binomial name
- Nyctemera toxopei van Eecke, 1929

Species of moth

Nyctemera toxopei is a moth of the family Erebidae first described by van Eecke in 1929. It is found on Buru in Indonesia.
