= Nyctemera sonticum =

Scientific classification
- Domain: Eukaryota
- Kingdom: Animalia
- Phylum: Arthropoda
- Class: Insecta
- Order: Lepidoptera
- Superfamily: Noctuoidea
- Family: Erebidae
- Subfamily: Arctiinae
- Genus: Nyctemera
- Species: N. sonticum

Binomial name
- Nyctemera sonticum (C. Swinhoe, 1892)

Synonyms
- Leptosoma sonticum C. Swinhoe, 1892; Nyctemera sontica; Nyctemera sonticum Semper, 1899; Deilemera purata C. Swinhoe, 1917; Nyctemera sontica f. homologa Seitz, 1915

Species of moth

Nyctemera sonticum is a moth of the family Erebidae first described by Charles Swinhoe in 1892. It is found in the Philippines and Borneo (Sabah).
