= Nyctemera mesolychna =

Scientific classification
- Kingdom: Animalia
- Phylum: Arthropoda
- Class: Insecta
- Order: Lepidoptera
- Superfamily: Noctuoidea
- Family: Erebidae
- Subfamily: Arctiinae
- Genus: Nyctemera
- Species: N. mesolychna

Binomial name
- Nyctemera mesolychna Meyrick, 1889

Synonyms
- Deilema pratti Bethune-Baker, 1904; Nyctemera baulus pratti

Species of moth

Nyctemera mesolychna is a moth of the family Erebidae. It is widely distributed in the eastern part of New Guinea at altitudes ranging from sea level to 1,800 meters.

The length of the forewings is 19–21 mm.
