= Nyctemera obtusa =

Scientific classification
- Kingdom: Animalia
- Phylum: Arthropoda
- Class: Insecta
- Order: Lepidoptera
- Superfamily: Noctuoidea
- Family: Erebidae
- Subfamily: Arctiinae
- Genus: Nyctemera
- Species: N. obtusa

Binomial name
- Nyctemera obtusa Walker, 1856

Species of moth

Nyctemera obtusa is a moth of the family Erebidae first described by Francis Walker in 1856. It is found on Sulawesi in Indonesia.
