= Nyctemera luzonica =

Scientific classification
- Domain: Eukaryota
- Kingdom: Animalia
- Phylum: Arthropoda
- Class: Insecta
- Order: Lepidoptera
- Superfamily: Noctuoidea
- Family: Erebidae
- Subfamily: Arctiinae
- Genus: Nyctemera
- Species: N. luzonica

Binomial name
- Nyctemera luzonica (C. Swinhoe, 1917)

Synonyms
- Deilemera luzonica C. Swinhoe, 1917; Deilemera plesiastes West, 1932

Species of moth

Nyctemera luzonica is a moth of the family Erebidae first described by Charles Swinhoe in 1917. It is found in the Philippines (Luzon, Mindanao, Bohol, Cebu, Leyte, Negros, Samar, Sibuyan).

== Subspecies ==
- Nyctemera luzonica luzonica (Philippines: Luzon, Mindanao, Bohol, Cebu, Leyte, Negros, Samar, Sibuyan)
- Nyctemera luzonica plesiastes (West, 1932) (Philippines: northern Luzon)
