= Nyctemera immitans =

Scientific classification
- Domain: Eukaryota
- Kingdom: Animalia
- Phylum: Arthropoda
- Class: Insecta
- Order: Lepidoptera
- Superfamily: Noctuoidea
- Family: Erebidae
- Subfamily: Arctiinae
- Genus: Nyctemera
- Species: N. immitans

Binomial name
- Nyctemera immitans (Rothschild, 1915)

Synonyms
- Deilemera immitans Rothschild, 1915

Species of moth

Nyctemera immitans is a moth of the family Erebidae first described by Walter Rothschild in 1915. It is found on Seram in Indonesia.
