= Nyctemera palawanica =

Scientific classification
- Domain: Eukaryota
- Kingdom: Animalia
- Phylum: Arthropoda
- Class: Insecta
- Order: Lepidoptera
- Superfamily: Noctuoidea
- Family: Erebidae
- Subfamily: Arctiinae
- Genus: Nyctemera
- Species: N. palawanica

Binomial name
- Nyctemera palawanica De Vos & Černý, 1999

Species of moth

Nyctemera palawanica is a moth of the family Erebidae first described by Rob de Vos and Karel Černý in 1999. It is found on Palawan in the Philippines.
