= Nyctemera warmasina =

Scientific classification
- Domain: Eukaryota
- Kingdom: Animalia
- Phylum: Arthropoda
- Class: Insecta
- Order: Lepidoptera
- Superfamily: Noctuoidea
- Family: Erebidae
- Subfamily: Arctiinae
- Genus: Nyctemera
- Species: N. warmasina

Binomial name
- Nyctemera warmasina (Bethune-Baker, 1910)

Synonyms
- Deilemera warmasina Bethune-Baker, 1910

Species of moth

Nyctemera warmasina is a moth of the family Erebidae first described by George Thomas Bethune-Baker in 1910. It is found on New Guinea.
