= Nyctemera hyalina =

Scientific classification
- Domain: Eukaryota
- Kingdom: Animalia
- Phylum: Arthropoda
- Class: Insecta
- Order: Lepidoptera
- Superfamily: Noctuoidea
- Family: Erebidae
- Subfamily: Arctiinae
- Genus: Nyctemera
- Species: N. hyalina

Binomial name
- Nyctemera hyalina (Bethune-Baker, 1910)

Synonyms
- Deilemera hyalina Bethune-Baker, 1910

Species of moth

Nyctemera hyalina is a moth of the family Erebidae first described by George Thomas Bethune-Baker in 1910. It is found on Sulawesi, Seram, Buru, the Moluccas and in New Guinea.

== Subspecies ==
- Nyctemera hyalina hyalina (New Guinea: Arfak Mountains)
- Nyctemera hyalina diaphana Roepke, 1949 (Sulawesi)
- Nyctemera hyalina stresemanni Rothschild, 1915 (Seram, Buru)
