= Nyctemera ploesslo =

Scientific classification
- Domain: Eukaryota
- Kingdom: Animalia
- Phylum: Arthropoda
- Class: Insecta
- Order: Lepidoptera
- Superfamily: Noctuoidea
- Family: Erebidae
- Subfamily: Arctiinae
- Genus: Nyctemera
- Species: N. ploesslo

Binomial name
- Nyctemera ploesslo Černý, 2009

Species of moth

Nyctemera ploesslo is a moth of the family Erebidae. It was described by Karel Černý in 2009 and is found in Thailand.
