= Nyctemera popiya =

Scientific classification
- Domain: Eukaryota
- Kingdom: Animalia
- Phylum: Arthropoda
- Class: Insecta
- Order: Lepidoptera
- Superfamily: Noctuoidea
- Family: Erebidae
- Subfamily: Arctiinae
- Genus: Nyctemera
- Species: N. popiya

Binomial name
- Nyctemera popiya (C. Swinhoe, 1903)

Synonyms
- Deilemera popiya C. Swinhoe, 1903

Species of moth

Nyctemera popiya is a moth of the family Erebidae first described by Charles Swinhoe in 1903. It is found on Java in Indonesia.
