= Nyctemera radiata =

Scientific classification
- Kingdom: Animalia
- Phylum: Arthropoda
- Class: Insecta
- Order: Lepidoptera
- Superfamily: Noctuoidea
- Family: Erebidae
- Subfamily: Arctiinae
- Genus: Nyctemera
- Species: N. radiata

Binomial name
- Nyctemera radiata Walker, 1856

Synonyms
- Nyctemera alternata Walker, 1856; Leptosoma proprium Swinhoe, 1892; Leptosoma eryla Semper, 1899; Leptosoma convexa Semper, 1899; Nyctemera propria loligo Seitz, 1915; Nyctemera alternata semibrunnea Seitz, 1915; Nyctemera latistriga kotoshonis Matsumura, 1930

Species of moth

Nyctemera radiata is a moth of the family Erebidae first described by Francis Walker in 1856. It is found in the Philippines.
