= Nyctemera maculata =

Scientific classification
- Kingdom: Animalia
- Phylum: Arthropoda
- Class: Insecta
- Order: Lepidoptera
- Superfamily: Noctuoidea
- Family: Erebidae
- Subfamily: Arctiinae
- Genus: Nyctemera
- Species: N. maculata

Binomial name
- Nyctemera maculata Walker, 1854

Synonyms
- Leptosoma noviespunctatum Vollenhoven, 1863

Species of moth

Nyctemera maculata is a moth of the family Erebidae first described by Francis Walker in 1854. It is found on Java, Bali, Lombok and Flores.

== Subspecies ==
- Nyctemera maculata maculata (Java)
- Nyctemera maculata variamacula de Vos, 2002 (Bali, Lombok, Flores)
