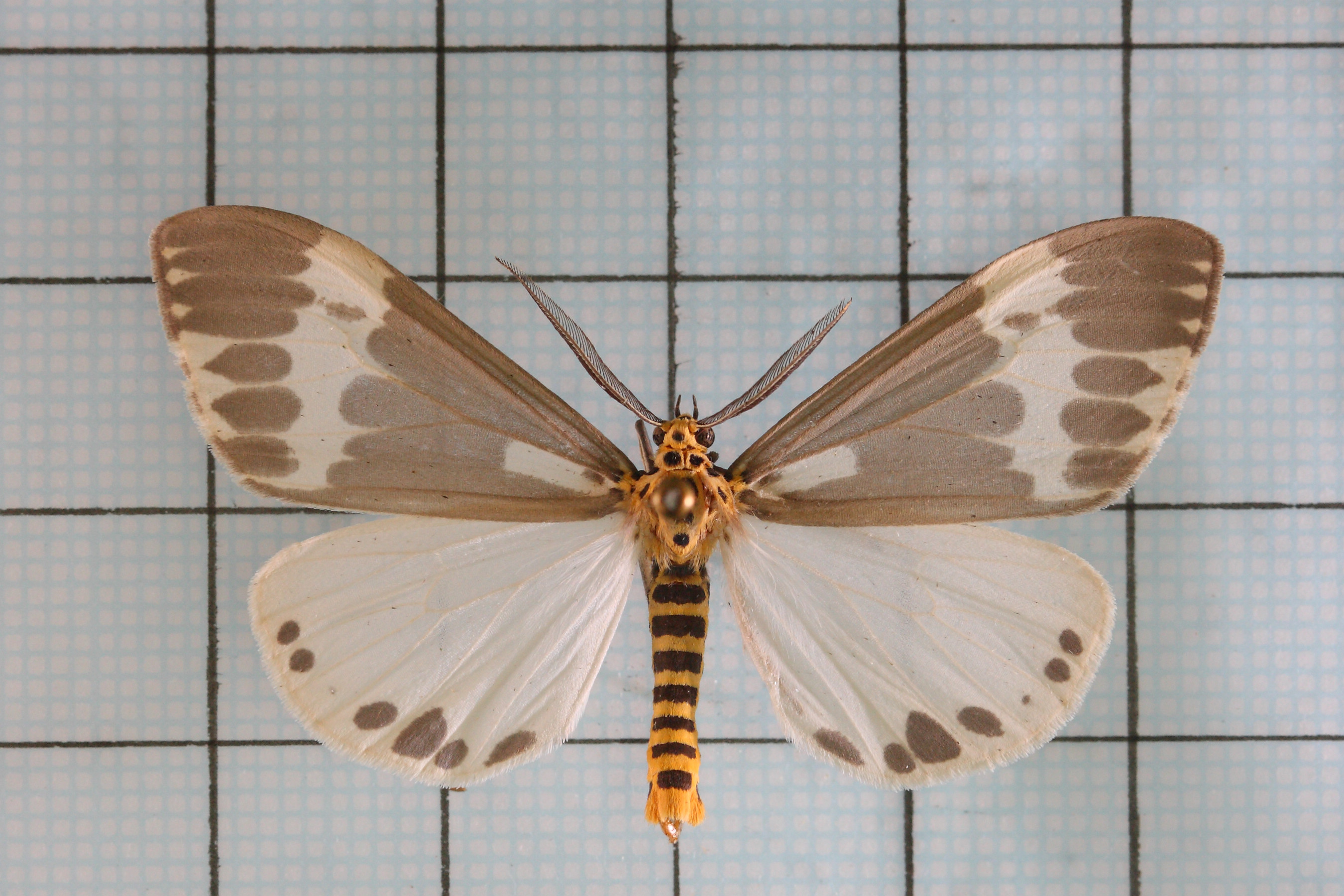
- Nyctemera arctata albofasciata

Scientific classification
- Kingdom: Animalia
- Phylum: Arthropoda
- Class: Insecta
- Order: Lepidoptera
- Superfamily: Noctuoidea
- Family: Erebidae
- Subfamily: Arctiinae
- Genus: Nyctemera
- Species: N. arctata

Binomial name
- Nyctemera arctata Walker, 1856

Synonyms
- Arctata arctata; Nyctemera maculosa Walker, 1864; Nyctemera dentifascia Kalis, 1934; Deilemera arctata albofasciata Wileman, 1911; Leptosoma scalarium Vollenhoven, 1863; Deilemera arctata javana Reich, 1932

= Nyctemera arctata =

Species of moth

Nyctemera arctata is a moth of the family Erebidae. It is found in India, China, Nepal, Bhutan, Myanmar, the Philippines, Taiwan and Indonesia. The species was described by Francis Walker in 1856.

== Subspecies ==
- Nyctemera arctata arctata (Yunnan, Tibet, Nepal, Bhutan, northern India, north-eastern India, Burma)
- Nyctemera arctata albofasciata (Wileman, 1911) (Taiwan, Philippines: Luzon)
- Nyctemera arctata scalarium (Vollenhoven, 1863) (Java)
- Nyctemera arctata zerenoides (Butler, 1881) (Sumatra)
