= Nyctemera gratia =

Scientific classification
- Domain: Eukaryota
- Kingdom: Animalia
- Phylum: Arthropoda
- Class: Insecta
- Order: Lepidoptera
- Superfamily: Noctuoidea
- Family: Erebidae
- Subfamily: Arctiinae
- Genus: Nyctemera
- Species: N. gratia

Binomial name
- Nyctemera gratia (Schultze, 1910)

Synonyms
- Deilemera gratia Schultze, 1910; Deilemera venata Wileman, 1915; Migoplastis philippinensis Rothschild, 1933

Species of moth

Nyctemera gratia is a moth of the family Erebidae first described by Schultze in 1910. It is found on the Philippine islands of Luzon and Negros.
