= Nyctemera angustipenis =

Scientific classification
- Domain: Eukaryota
- Kingdom: Animalia
- Phylum: Arthropoda
- Class: Insecta
- Order: Lepidoptera
- Superfamily: Noctuoidea
- Family: Erebidae
- Subfamily: Arctiinae
- Genus: Nyctemera
- Species: N. angustipenis

Binomial name
- Nyctemera angustipenis Kishida, 1994

Species of moth

Nyctemera angustipenis is a moth of the family Erebidae first described by Yasunori Kishida in 1994. It is found on Luzon in the Philippines.
