= Nyctemera groenendaeli =

Scientific classification
- Domain: Eukaryota
- Kingdom: Animalia
- Phylum: Arthropoda
- Class: Insecta
- Order: Lepidoptera
- Superfamily: Noctuoidea
- Family: Erebidae
- Subfamily: Arctiinae
- Genus: Nyctemera
- Species: N. groenendaeli

Binomial name
- Nyctemera groenendaeli De Vos, 1994

Species of moth

Nyctemera groenendaeli is a moth of the family Erebidae first described by Rob de Vos in 1994. It is found in New Guinea.
