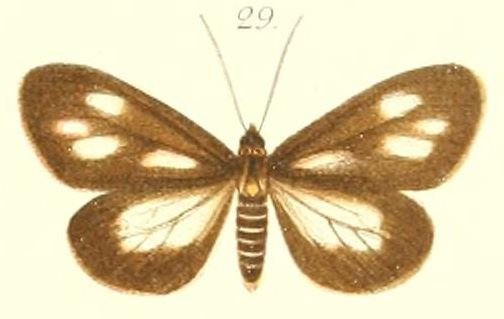

Scientific classification
- Domain: Eukaryota
- Kingdom: Animalia
- Phylum: Arthropoda
- Class: Insecta
- Order: Lepidoptera
- Superfamily: Noctuoidea
- Family: Erebidae
- Subfamily: Arctiinae
- Genus: Nyctemera
- Species: N. quaternarium

Binomial name
- Nyctemera quaternarium Pagenstecher, 1900

= Nyctemera quaternarium =

Species of moth

Nyctemera quaternarium is a moth of the family Erebidae first described by Arnold Pagenstecher in 1900. It is found on the Bismarck Archipelago of Papua New Guinea.
