= Nyctemera swinhoei =

Scientific classification
- Domain: Eukaryota
- Kingdom: Animalia
- Phylum: Arthropoda
- Class: Insecta
- Order: Lepidoptera
- Superfamily: Noctuoidea
- Family: Erebidae
- Subfamily: Arctiinae
- Genus: Nyctemera
- Species: N. swinhoei

Binomial name
- Nyctemera swinhoei de Vos, 2002

Species of moth

Nyctemera swinhoei is a moth of the family Erebidae first described by Rob de Vos in 2002. It is found on the northern Moluccas (Bacan, Halmahera, Morotai, Obi, Ternate).
