= Nyctemera apensis =

Scientific classification
- Domain: Eukaryota
- Kingdom: Animalia
- Phylum: Arthropoda
- Class: Insecta
- Order: Lepidoptera
- Superfamily: Noctuoidea
- Family: Erebidae
- Subfamily: Arctiinae
- Genus: Nyctemera
- Species: N. apensis

Binomial name
- Nyctemera apensis Semper, 1899

Species of moth

Nyctemera apensis is a moth of the family Erebidae first described by Georg Semper in 1899. It is found on Mindanao in the Philippines.
