= Nyctemera trita =

Scientific classification
- Kingdom: Animalia
- Phylum: Arthropoda
- Class: Insecta
- Order: Lepidoptera
- Superfamily: Noctuoidea
- Family: Erebidae
- Subfamily: Arctiinae
- Genus: Nyctemera
- Species: N. trita

Binomial name
- Nyctemera trita Walker, 1854

Synonyms
- Nyctemera herce Pagenstecher, 1901; Nyctemera asiimilis Seitz, 1915; Nyctemera assimilis battakorum Seitz, 1915; Nyctemera seitzi van Eecke, 1927; Eilemera hearca reducta Rothschild, 1920

Species of moth

Nyctemera trita is a moth of the family Erebidae first described by Francis Walker in 1854. It is found on Malacca, Java, Sumatra and Lombok.

== Subspecies ==
- Nyctemera trita trita (Java, Lombok)
- Nyctemera trita tritoides Heylaerts, 1890 (Sumatra)
- Nyctemera trita harca (Swinhoe, 1893) (Malacca)
