= Nyctemera giloloensis =

Scientific classification
- Domain: Eukaryota
- Kingdom: Animalia
- Phylum: Arthropoda
- Class: Insecta
- Order: Lepidoptera
- Superfamily: Noctuoidea
- Family: Erebidae
- Subfamily: Arctiinae
- Genus: Nyctemera
- Species: N. giloloensis

Binomial name
- Nyctemera giloloensis de Vos, 2007

Species of moth

Nyctemera giloloensis is a moth of the family Erebidae. It is found on the northern Moluccan Islands Halmahera and Morotai.

The length of the forewings is about 23 mm.
