= Nyctemera leopoldi =

Scientific classification
- Kingdom: Animalia
- Phylum: Arthropoda
- Class: Insecta
- Order: Lepidoptera
- Superfamily: Noctuoidea
- Family: Erebidae
- Subfamily: Arctiinae
- Genus: Nyctemera
- Species: N. leopoldi

Binomial name
- Nyctemera leopoldi Tams, 1935

Species of moth

Nyctemera leopoldi is a moth of the family Erebidae. It is found in Papua, where it has been recorded from the Bird's Head Peninsula (Arfak Mountains) and the Kobowre (Weyland) Mountains. It has also been recorded from Numfor island.

The length of the forewings is 19–22 mm.
