= Nyctemera kishidai =

Scientific classification
- Domain: Eukaryota
- Kingdom: Animalia
- Phylum: Arthropoda
- Class: Insecta
- Order: Lepidoptera
- Superfamily: Noctuoidea
- Family: Erebidae
- Subfamily: Arctiinae
- Genus: Nyctemera
- Species: N. kishidai

Binomial name
- Nyctemera kishidai De Vos & Černý, 1999

Synonyms
- Nyctemera apoensis Kishida, 1994 (preocc. Semper, 1899)

Species of moth

Nyctemera kishidai is a moth of the family Erebidae first described by Rob de Vos and Karel Černý in 1999. It is found on Mindanao in the Philippines.
