= Nyctemera kiauensis =

Scientific classification
- Kingdom: Animalia
- Phylum: Arthropoda
- Clade: Pancrustacea
- Class: Insecta
- Order: Lepidoptera
- Superfamily: Noctuoidea
- Family: Erebidae
- Subfamily: Arctiinae
- Genus: Nyctemera
- Species: N. kiauensis

Binomial name
- Nyctemera kiauensis Holloway, 1976

Species of moth

Nyctemera kiauensis is a moth of the family Erebidae first described by Jeremy Daniel Holloway in 1976. It is found on Borneo.
