= Nyctemera tenompoka =

Scientific classification
- Kingdom: Animalia
- Phylum: Arthropoda
- Clade: Pancrustacea
- Class: Insecta
- Order: Lepidoptera
- Superfamily: Noctuoidea
- Family: Erebidae
- Subfamily: Arctiinae
- Genus: Nyctemera
- Species: N. tenompoka

Binomial name
- Nyctemera tenompoka Holloway, 1988

Species of moth

Nyctemera tenompoka is a moth of the family Erebidae first described by Jeremy Daniel Holloway in 1988. It is found on Borneo. The habitat consists of secondary montane forests and agricultural terraces on mountain slopes.

The length of the forewings is about 21 mm.
