= Nyctemera kebeae =

Scientific classification
- Kingdom: Animalia
- Phylum: Arthropoda
- Class: Insecta
- Order: Lepidoptera
- Superfamily: Noctuoidea
- Family: Erebidae
- Subfamily: Arctiinae
- Genus: Nyctemera
- Species: N. kebeae

Binomial name
- Nyctemera kebeae (Bethune-Baker, 1904)

Synonyms
- Deilemera kebeae Bethune-Baker, 1904

Species of moth

Nyctemera kebeae is a moth of the family Erebidae first described by George Thomas Bethune-Baker in 1904. It is found on New Guinea.

== Subspecies ==
- Nyctemera kebeae kebeae (Papua New Guinea: Owen Stanley Range)
- Nyctemera kebeae intermedia de Vos, 1997 (Irian Jaya: Star Mountains, north of the Baliem Valley)
- Nyctemera kebeae occidentalis de Vos, 1997 (Irian Jaya: Snow Mountains, Weyland Mountains, Wissel Lakes)
