= Nyctemera contrasta =

Scientific classification
- Domain: Eukaryota
- Kingdom: Animalia
- Phylum: Arthropoda
- Class: Insecta
- Order: Lepidoptera
- Superfamily: Noctuoidea
- Family: Erebidae
- Subfamily: Arctiinae
- Genus: Nyctemera
- Species: N. contrasta

Binomial name
- Nyctemera contrasta De Vos & Černý, 1999

Species of moth

Nyctemera contrasta is a moth of the family Erebidae first described by Rob de Vos and Karel Černý in 1999. It is found in the Philippines (Mindanao, Negros, Palawan).

== Subspecies ==
- Nyctemera contrasta contrasta (Philippines: Mindanao)
- Nyctemera contrasta negrosica De Vos & Černý, 1999 (Philippines: Negros)
- Nyctemera contrasta supracontrasta De Vos & Černý, 1999 (Philippines: Palawan)
