= Nyctemera browni =

Scientific classification
- Domain: Eukaryota
- Kingdom: Animalia
- Phylum: Arthropoda
- Class: Insecta
- Order: Lepidoptera
- Superfamily: Noctuoidea
- Family: Erebidae
- Subfamily: Arctiinae
- Genus: Nyctemera
- Species: N. browni

Binomial name
- Nyctemera browni (Schultze, 1908)

Synonyms
- Deilemera browni Schultze, 1908; Deilemera arctata browni; Nyctemera arctata browni; Deilemera conjuncta Wileman, 1915; Nyctemera conjuncta; Nyctemera arctata scalarium Roepke, 1949 (nec Snellen van Vollenhoven, 1863)

Species of moth

Nyctemera browni is a moth of the family Erebidae first described by Schultze in 1908. It is found in the Philippines and Taiwan.
