= Nyctemera distincta =

Scientific classification
- Kingdom: Animalia
- Phylum: Arthropoda
- Class: Insecta
- Order: Lepidoptera
- Superfamily: Noctuoidea
- Family: Erebidae
- Subfamily: Arctiinae
- Genus: Nyctemera
- Species: N. distincta

Binomial name
- Nyctemera distincta Walker, 1854

Synonyms
- Leptosoma anthracinum Vollenhoven, 1863

Species of moth

Nyctemera distincta is a moth of the family Erebidae first described by Francis Walker in 1854. It is found on Java in Indonesia.
