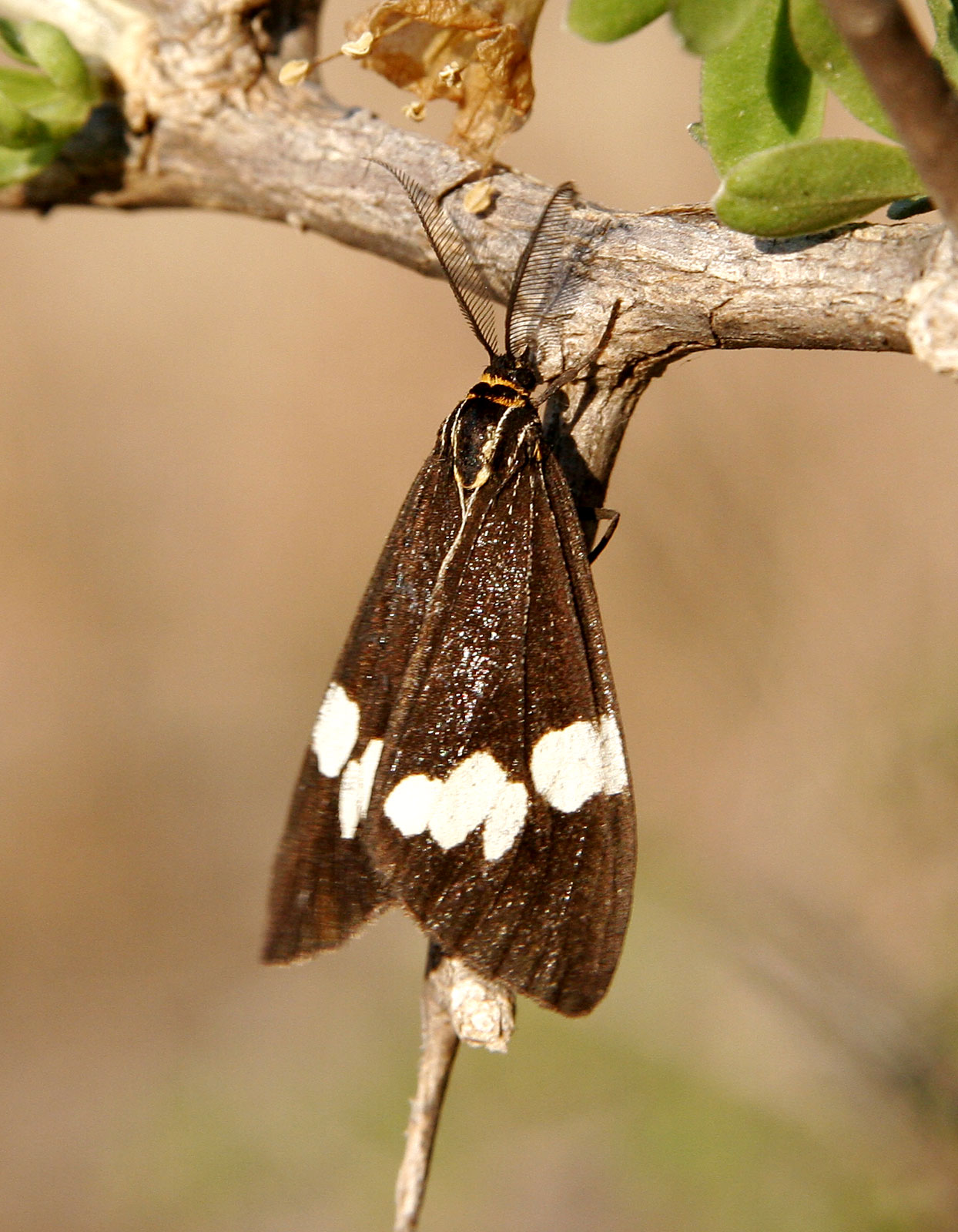
- Nyctemera amica

Scientific classification
- Kingdom: Animalia
- Phylum: Arthropoda
- Clade: Pancrustacea
- Class: Insecta
- Order: Lepidoptera
- Superfamily: Noctuoidea
- Family: Erebidae
- Subfamily: Arctiinae
- Subtribe: Nyctemerina
- Genus: Nyctemera; Hübner, 1820

Synonyms
- Agagles White, 1841; Amathes Gistl, 1848; Arctata Roepke, 1949; Coleta Roepke, 1949; Deilemera Hübner, 1820; Leptosoma Boisduval, 1832; Orphanos Hübner, 1825; Tristania Kirby, 1892; Trypheromera Butler, 1881; Zonosoma Butler, 1881

= Nyctemera =

Genus of moths

Nyctemera is a genus of tiger moths in the family Erebidae first described by Jacob Hübner in 1820. The genus includes the species Nyctemera annulata and Nyctemera amica, which are closely related and are able to interbreed.

== Description ==
They are medium-sized moths, the adults having a wingspan of 35–45 millimetres (1.4–1.8 in). The wings are usually dark with lighter patches, while the body is often aposematically coloured to discourage birds and other visual predators from eating them.

Palpi porrectly upturned. Antennae bipectinate in both sexes, where branches short in females. Forewing with vein 3 from before the angle of cell, vein 5 from above it and vein 6 from upper angle. Vein 7 and 10 from short areole which is formed by the anastomosis of veins 8 and 9. Hindwings with vein 3 from before end of cell and vein 5 from angle or from above it. Veins 6 and 7 stalked or from upper angle. Vein 8 from before middle of all.

== Ecology ==
The slow-flying moths can often be seen feeding at flowers; it is common around its preferred food plants of the daisy family, for example groundsel (and other Senecio spp.), ragworts and Cineraria. The colourful hairy larvae feed openly on the plants, often stripping off all the leaves. The mature larvae will sometimes wander from the plant to pupate. The loosely spun cocoon incorporates some of the larval hairs and may also be found amongst leaves.

== Taxonomy ==
Several species formerly placed here are now assigned to other genera. These include Utetheisa (containing Atasca, Pitasila and Raanya, erstwhile subgenera of Nyctemera), the revalidated Chiromachla, Podomachla and Xylecata, and the newly established Afronyctemera.

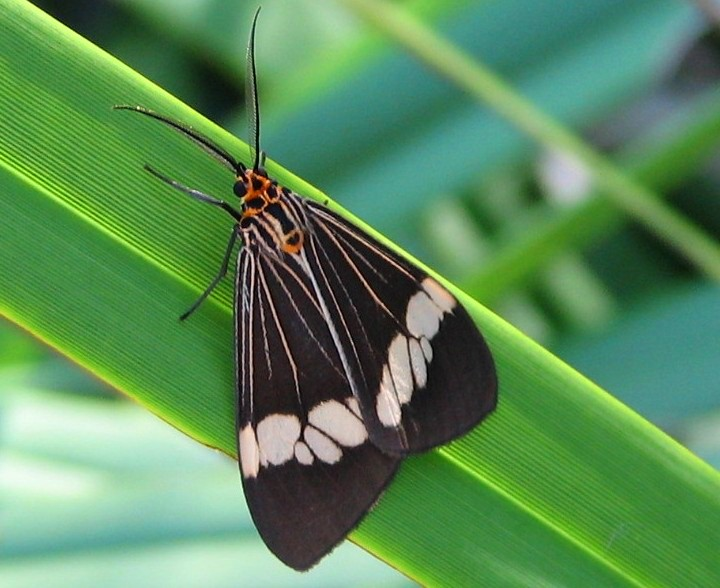
Magpie moth (Nyctemera secundiana) found in central Queensland, Australia

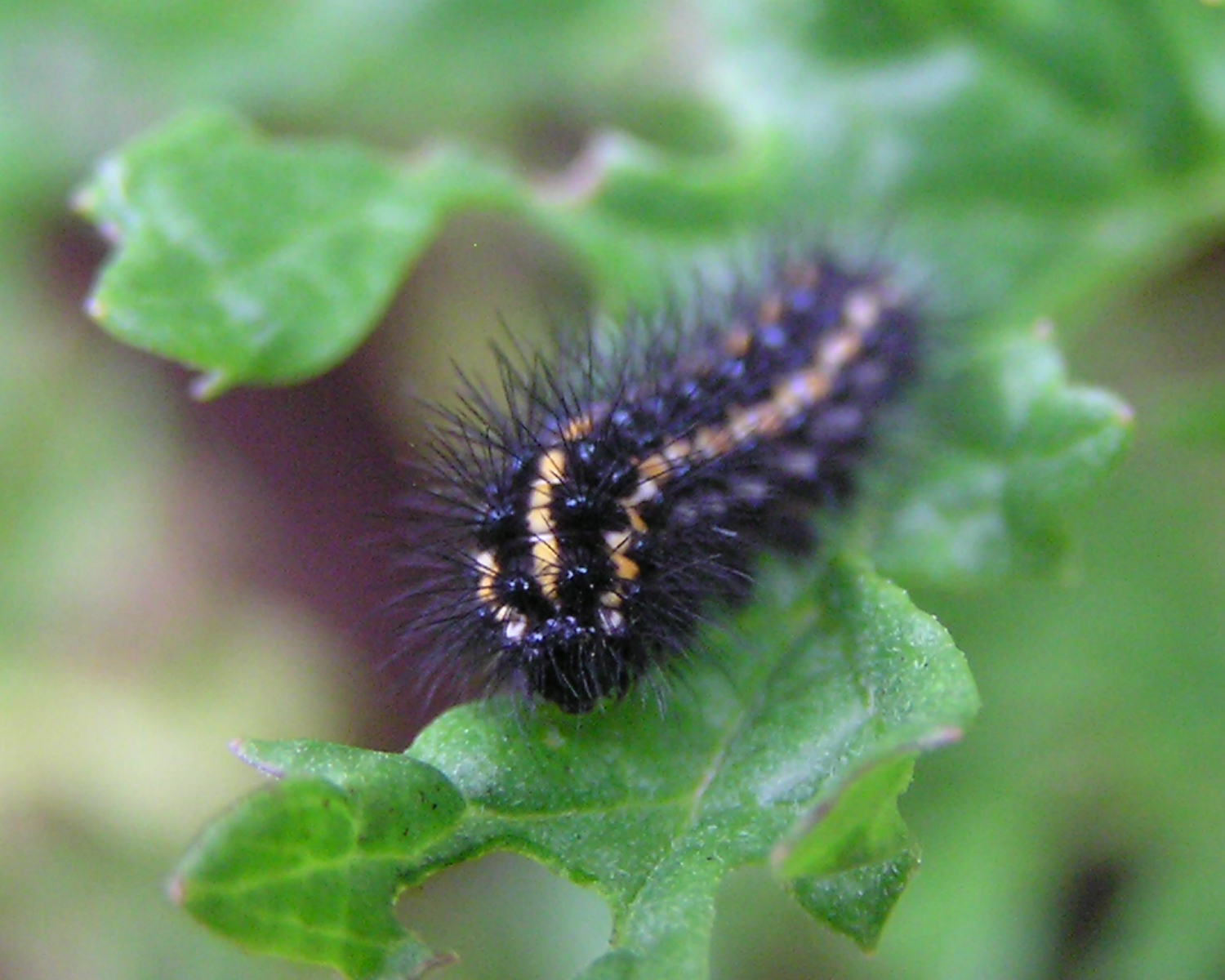
Magpie moth (Nyctemera annulata) caterpillar feeding on ragwort in Wellington, New Zealand

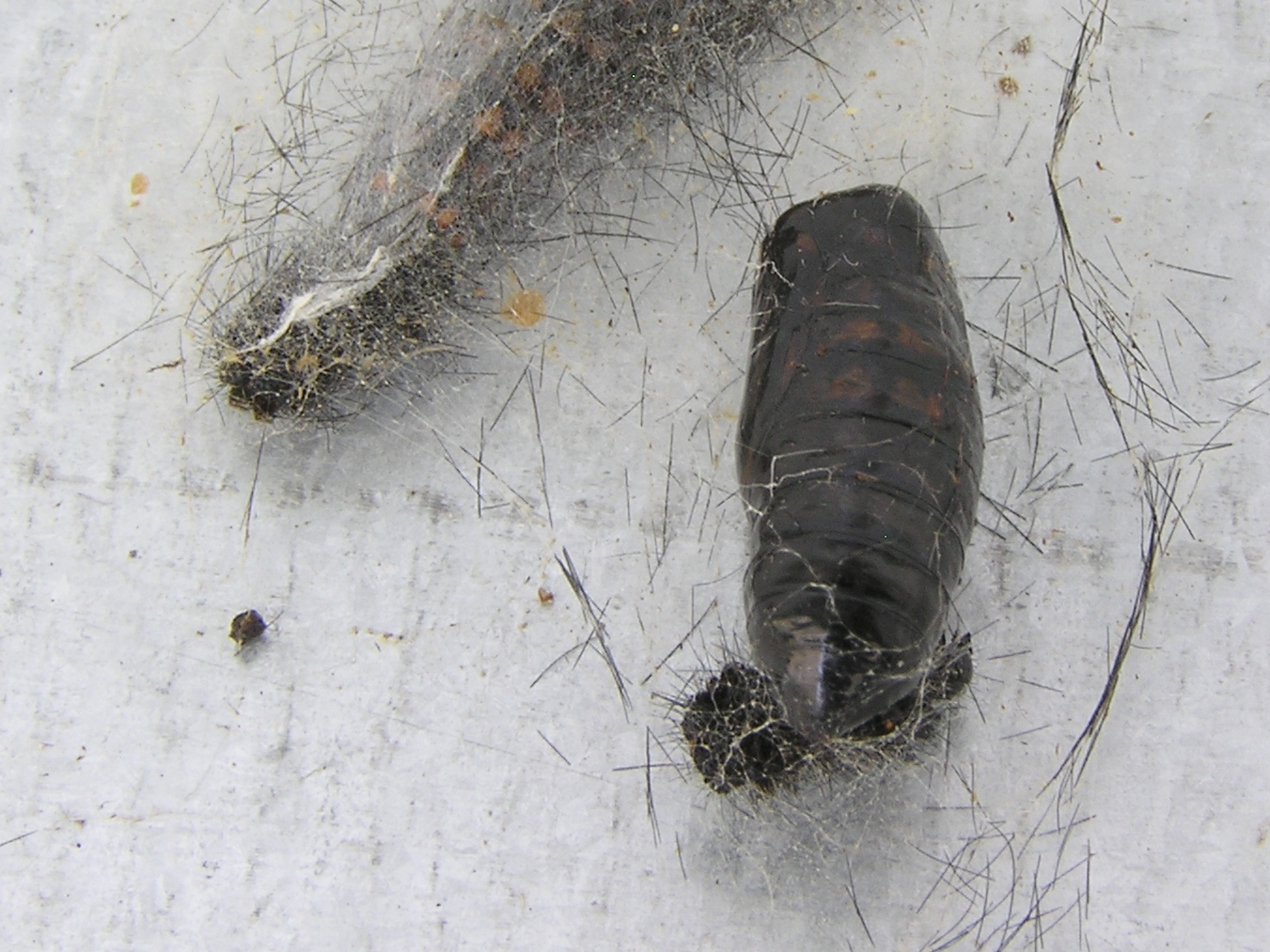
Magpie moth (Nyctemera annulata) cocoon

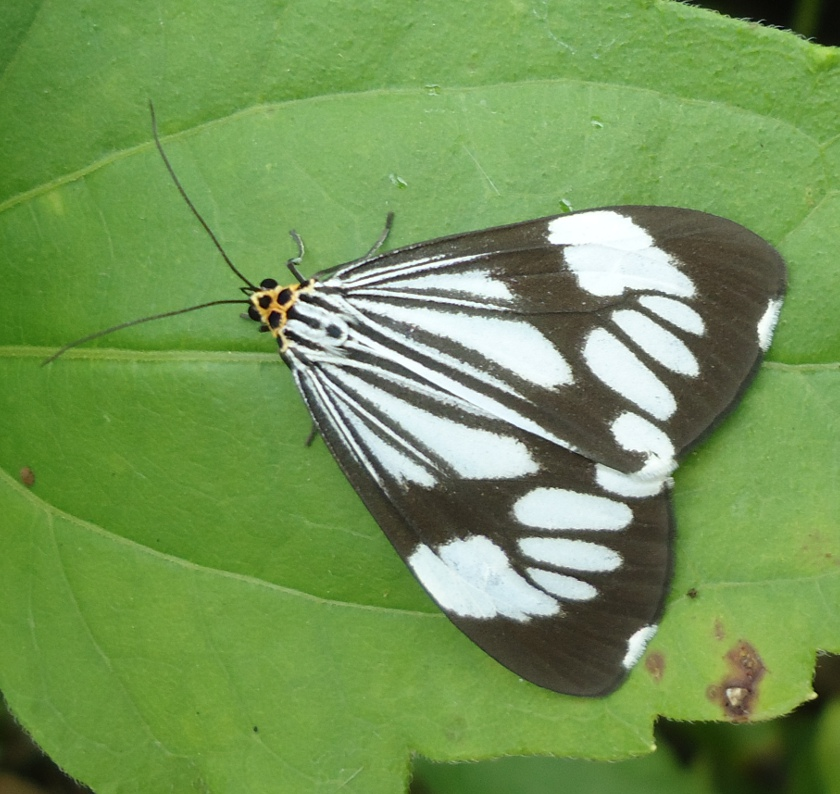
Marbled white moth (Nyctemera coleta) from the Philippines

== Species ==
=== Subgenus Arctata Roepke, 1949 ===
- Nyctemera angustipenis
- Nyctemera arctata
- Nyctemera montata
- Nyctemera browni
- Nyctemera consobriniformis
- Nyctemera gratia
- Nyctemera hyalina
- Nyctemera kinabaluensis
- Nyctemera kishidai
- Nyctemera lunulata
- Nyctemera luzonensis
- Nyctemera owadai
- Nyctemera palawanica
- Nyctemera robusta
- Nyctemera toxopei
- Nyctemera undulata

=== Subgenus Coleta Roepke, 1949 ===
- Nyctemera coleta
- Nyctemera groenendaeli

=== Subgenus Deilemera Hübner, [1820], 1816 ===
- Nyctemera carissima
- Nyctemera evergista
- Nyctemera gerra
- Nyctemera luzonica
- Nyctemera maculata
- Nyctemera muelleri
- Nyctemera swinhoei

=== Subgenus Luctuosana de Vos, 2010 ===
- Nyctemera contrasta
- Nyctemera dentifascia
- Nyctemera herklotsii
- Nyctemera luctuosa
- Nyctemera ludekingii
- Nyctemera simulatrix

=== Subgenus Nyctemera s.str. ===
- Nyctemera amicus
- Nyctemera annulata
- Nyctemera baulus
- Nyctemera cenis
- Nyctemera kala
- Nyctemera kebeae
- Nyctemera lacticinia
- Nyctemera latemarginata
- Nyctemera latistriga
- Nyctemera mastrigti
- Nyctemera obtusa
- Nyctemera pagenstecheri
- Nyctemera pseudokala
- Nyctemera sonticum
- Nyctemera warmasina

=== The Nyctemera (Nyctemera) clathrata species group ===
- Nyctemera clathratum
- Nyctemera dauila
- Nyctemera giloloensis
- Nyctemera latimargo
- Nyctemera leopoldi
- Nyctemera mesolychna
- Nyctemera oninica

=== Subgenus Orphanos Hübner, [1825], 1816 ===
- Nyctemera adversata
- Nyctemera apensis
- Nyctemera calcicola
- Nyctemera clarior
- Nyctemera distincta
- Nyctemera kiauensis
- Nyctemera kinibalina
- Nyctemera lugens
- Nyctemera malaccana
- Nyctemera ploesslo
- Nyctemera popiya
- Nyctemera radiata
- Nyctemera regularis
- Nyctemera sumatrensis
- Nyctemera tenompoka
- Nyctemera tripunctaria

=== Subgenus Tritomera de Vos & Dubatolov, 2010 ===
- Nyctemera trita

=== Unsorted Nyctemera species ===
- Nyctemera formosana (mostly placed as a synonym of Nyctemera carissima)
- Nyctemera genora
- Nyctemera immitans
- Nyctemera quaternarium

=== Afrotropical species transferred into Afronyctemera Dubatolov, 2006 ===
- Nyctemera itokina

=== Afrotropical species transferred into Chiromachla Strand, 1909 ===
- Nyctemera chalcosidia
- Nyctemera gracilis
- Nyctemera insulare
- Nyctemera leuconoe
- Nyctemera pallescens
- Nyctemera perspicua
- Nyctemera restrictum
- Nyctemera seychellensis
- Nyctemera torbeni
- Nyctemera transitella

=== Afrotropical species transferred into Podomachla Strand, 1909 ===
- Nyctemera acraeina
- Nyctemera antinorii
- Nyctemera apicalis
- Nyctemera arieticornis
- Nyctemera chromis
- Nyctemera insularis
- Nyctemera usambarae
- Nyctemera virgo

=== Afrotropical species transferred into Xylecata Swinhoe, 1904 ===
- Nyctemera biformis
- Nyctemera crassiantennata
- Nyctemera druna
- Nyctemera glauce
- Nyctemera hemixantha
- Nyctemera rattrayi
- Nyctemera ugandicola
- Nyctemera uniformis
- Nyctemera xanthura

== Main articles on Nyctemera taxonomy ==
- de Vos, R. 1994 [1995]: Nyctemera groenendaeli spec. nov. from New Guinea (Lepidoptera: Arctiidae, Nyctemerina). Nachrichten des Entomologischen Vereins Apollo, N.F. 15 (4): 481–489.
- de Vos, R. 1995: A revision of Nyctemera consobrina (Hopffer, 1874) with redescription of three subspecies (Lepidoptera: Arctiidae, Nyctemerinae). Nachrichten des Entomologischen Vereins Apollo, N.F. 16 (1): 81–93.
- de Vos, R. 1996: Nyctemera pseudokala sp. nov. and N. mastrigti sp. nov., two new species from Indonesia (Lepidoptera: Arctiidae, Nyctemerinae). Nachrichten des Entomologischen Vereins Apollo, N.F. 17 (3): 301–311.
- de Vos, R. 1997: A revision of Nyctemera kebeae (Bethune-Baker, 1904) (with descriptions of two new subspecies) and N. warmasina (Bethune-Baker, 1910) (Lepidoptera: Arctiidae, Nyctemerinae). Nachrichten des Entomologischen Vereins Apollo, N.F. 18 (1): 1-12.
- de Vos, R. 1997: The identity of Nyctemera simulatrix Walker, 1864 (Lepidoptera: Arctiidae, Nyctemerinae). Nachrichten des Entomologischen Vereins Apollo, N.F. 18 (2-3): 205–210.
- de Vos, R. 2002: Revision of the Nyctemera evergista group (=subgenus Deilemera Hübner) (Lepidoptera: Arctiidae, Arctiinae, Nyctemerini). Nachrichten des Entomologischen Vereins Apollo, N.F. 23 (1/2): 7-32.
- de Vos, R. 2007: Revision of the Nyctemera clathratum complex (Lepidoptera: Arctiidae). Tijdschrift voor Entomologie 150: 39–54.
- de Vos, R. 2007: The Utetheisa species of the subgenera Pitasila, Atasca and Raanya subgen. n. (Insecta, Lepidoptera: Arctiidae). Aldrovandia 3: 31-120.
- de Vos, Rob; Černý, Karel (1999). "A review of the Philippine species of the genus Nyctemera Hübner, [1820] with descriptions of new species and subspecies (Lepidoptera: Arctiidae, Nyctemerinae)" (PDF). Nachrichten des Entomologischen Vereins Apollo. N.F. 20 (2): 133–188.
- de Vos, R., Dubatolov, V.V. 2010: Nyctemerini. In: Dubatolov, V.V., Tiger-moths of Eurasia (Lepidoptera, Arctiidae). Neue Entomologische Nachrichten 65: 11–18.
- Dubatolov, V.V. 2006: On the generic status of the Afrotropical Nyctemera species (Lepidoptera, Arctiidae). Atalanta 37 (1/2): 191–205.
