= Nyctemera clathratum =

Scientific classification
- Kingdom: Animalia
- Phylum: Arthropoda
- Class: Insecta
- Order: Lepidoptera
- Superfamily: Noctuoidea
- Family: Erebidae
- Subfamily: Arctiinae
- Genus: Nyctemera
- Species: N. clathratum

Binomial name
- Nyctemera clathratum (Vollenhoven, 1863)

Synonyms
- Leptosoma clathratum Snellen van Vollenhoven, 1863; Leptosoma absurdum Swinhoe, 1892

Species of moth

Nyctemera clathratum is a moth of the family Erebidae first described by Vollenhoven in 1863. It is found in New Guinea and on the Moluccas (Ambon, Saparua and Seram).
