= Nyctemera latemarginata =

Scientific classification
- Domain: Eukaryota
- Kingdom: Animalia
- Phylum: Arthropoda
- Class: Insecta
- Order: Lepidoptera
- Superfamily: Noctuoidea
- Family: Erebidae
- Subfamily: Arctiinae
- Genus: Nyctemera
- Species: N. latemarginata

Binomial name
- Nyctemera latemarginata Pagenstecher, 1901

Species of moth

Nyctemera latemarginata is a moth of the family Erebidae first described by Arnold Pagenstecher in 1901. It is found in New Guinea.
