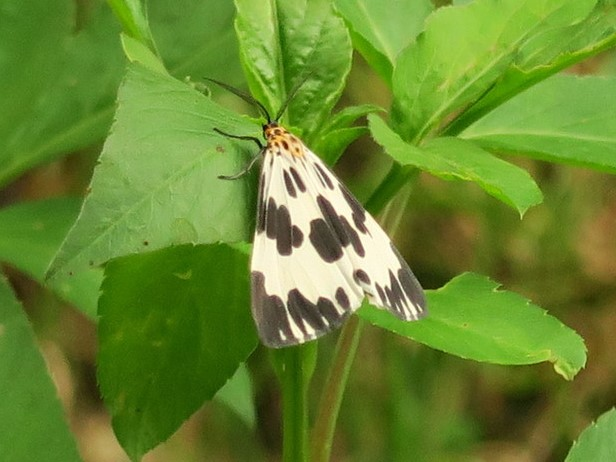

Scientific classification
- Domain: Eukaryota
- Kingdom: Animalia
- Phylum: Arthropoda
- Class: Insecta
- Order: Lepidoptera
- Superfamily: Noctuoidea
- Family: Erebidae
- Subfamily: Arctiinae
- Genus: Nyctemera
- Species: N. cenis

Binomial name
- Nyctemera cenis (Cramer, 1777)

Synonyms
- Phalaena Geometra cenis Cramer, 1777; Nyctemera (Orphanos) interlecta Walker, 1854; Deilemera cenis parva Swinhoe, 1917

= Nyctemera cenis =

Species of moth

Nyctemera cenis is a species of moth in the family Erebidae. It was first described by Pieter Cramer in 1777 and is found in China (Zhejiang, Yunnan), Taiwan, Japan (Ryukyu Islands), the north-western Himalayas, north-eastern India and Myanmar.
