= Nyctemera regularis =

Scientific classification
- Kingdom: Animalia
- Phylum: Arthropoda
- Class: Insecta
- Order: Lepidoptera
- Superfamily: Noctuoidea
- Family: Erebidae
- Subfamily: Arctiinae
- Genus: Nyctemera
- Species: N. regularis

Binomial name
- Nyctemera regularis (Snellen, 1880)

Synonyms
- Leptosoma regularis Snellen, 1880; Senusio picatus Butler, 1881; Nyctemera picata Kirby, 1892

Species of moth

Nyctemera regularis is a moth of the family Erebidae first described by Snellen in 1880. It is found on Sumatra, Java and Borneo.

== Subspecies ==
- Nyctemera regularis regularis (Sumatra)
- Nyctemera regularis crameri Roepke, 1949 (Java)
- Nyctemera regularis snelleni Pagenstecher, 1901 (Borneo)
