= Nyctemera oninica =

Scientific classification
- Domain: Eukaryota
- Kingdom: Animalia
- Phylum: Arthropoda
- Class: Insecta
- Order: Lepidoptera
- Superfamily: Noctuoidea
- Family: Erebidae
- Subfamily: Arctiinae
- Genus: Nyctemera
- Species: N. oninica

Binomial name
- Nyctemera oninica de Vos, 2007

Species of moth

Nyctemera oninica is a moth of the family Erebidae. The species is found in Papua, where it has been recorded from the Onin Peninsula, the Wandammen Peninsula, and Roon Island.

The length of the forewings is 21–22 mm.

== Etymology ==
The species name refers to the type location, the Onin Peninsula.
