= Nyctemera pagenstecheri =

Scientific classification
- Domain: Eukaryota
- Kingdom: Animalia
- Phylum: Arthropoda
- Class: Insecta
- Order: Lepidoptera
- Superfamily: Noctuoidea
- Family: Erebidae
- Subfamily: Arctiinae
- Genus: Nyctemera
- Species: N. pagenstecheri

Binomial name
- Nyctemera pagenstecheri Pagenstecher, 1898

Species of moth

Nyctemera pagenstecheri is a moth of the family Erebidae first described by Arnold Pagenstecher in 1898. It is found on Lombok, Sumbawa, Flores and Borneo (Pulo Laut).
