= Nyctemera dauila =

Scientific classification
- Domain: Eukaryota
- Kingdom: Animalia
- Phylum: Arthropoda
- Class: Insecta
- Order: Lepidoptera
- Superfamily: Noctuoidea
- Family: Erebidae
- Subfamily: Arctiinae
- Genus: Nyctemera
- Species: N. dauila

Binomial name
- Nyctemera dauila de Vos, 2007

Species of moth

Nyctemera dauila is a moth of the family Erebidae. The species is found on Goodenough Island.

The length of the forewings is 21–22 mm.
