= Nyctemera sumatrensis =

Scientific classification
- Domain: Eukaryota
- Kingdom: Animalia
- Phylum: Arthropoda
- Class: Insecta
- Order: Lepidoptera
- Superfamily: Noctuoidea
- Family: Erebidae
- Subfamily: Arctiinae
- Genus: Nyctemera
- Species: N. sumatrensis

Binomial name
- Nyctemera sumatrensis Heylaerts, 1890

Synonyms
- Nyctemera nesites Seitz, 1915; Deilemera instar Rothschild, 1920

Species of moth

Nyctemera sumatrensis is a moth of the family Erebidae first described by Franciscus J. M. Heylaerts in 1890. It is found on Malacca, Sumatra and Java.
