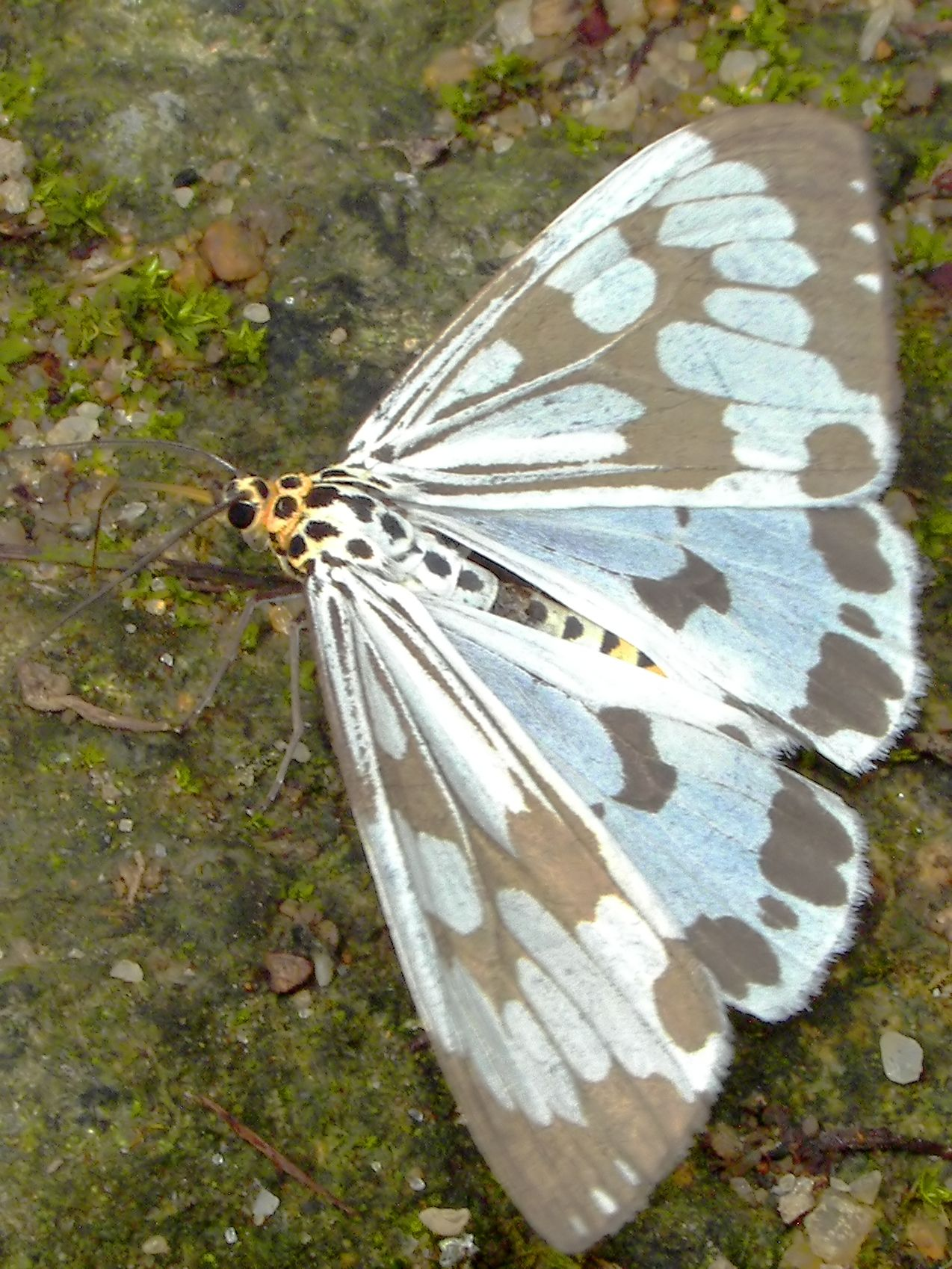

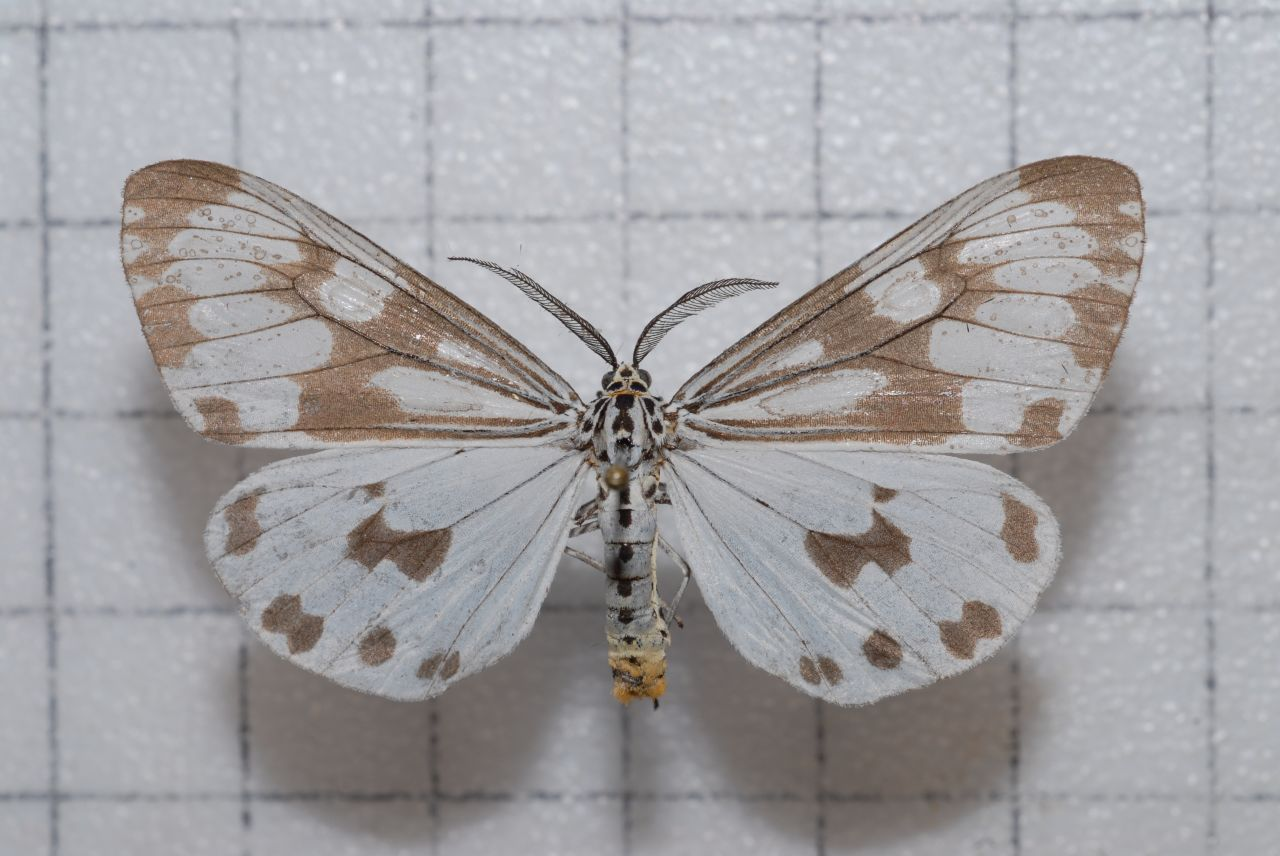

Scientific classification
- Domain: Eukaryota
- Kingdom: Animalia
- Phylum: Arthropoda
- Class: Insecta
- Order: Lepidoptera
- Superfamily: Noctuoidea
- Family: Erebidae
- Subfamily: Arctiinae
- Genus: Nyctemera
- Species: N. adversata

Binomial name
- Nyctemera adversata (Schaller, 1788)

Synonyms
- Phalaena adversata Schaller, 1788; Phalaena Geometra adversata Schaller, 1788; Nyctemera plagifera Walker, 1854; Nyctemera plagifera f. laticolora Reich, 1926

= Nyctemera adversata =

Marbled white moth

Species of moth

Nyctemera adversata, the marbled white moth, is a moth of the family Erebidae first described by Johann Gottlieb Schaller in 1788. It is found in Sri Lanka, Bangladesh, India, Nepal, Myanmar, China territories like Tibet, Sichuan, Yunnan, Guangdong, Hong Kong, Hainan, Guangxi, Hunan, Henan, Zhejiang, Jiangxi, Fujian, Taiwan, Japan (northern part of Honshu Island), Peninsular Malaysia, Thailand, Indonesia (Sumatra, Java and Borneo) Philippines.

Nyctemera adversata is a day-flying species.

The larvae feed on Erechtites, Erigeron, Gynura, Picris, and Senecio species.
