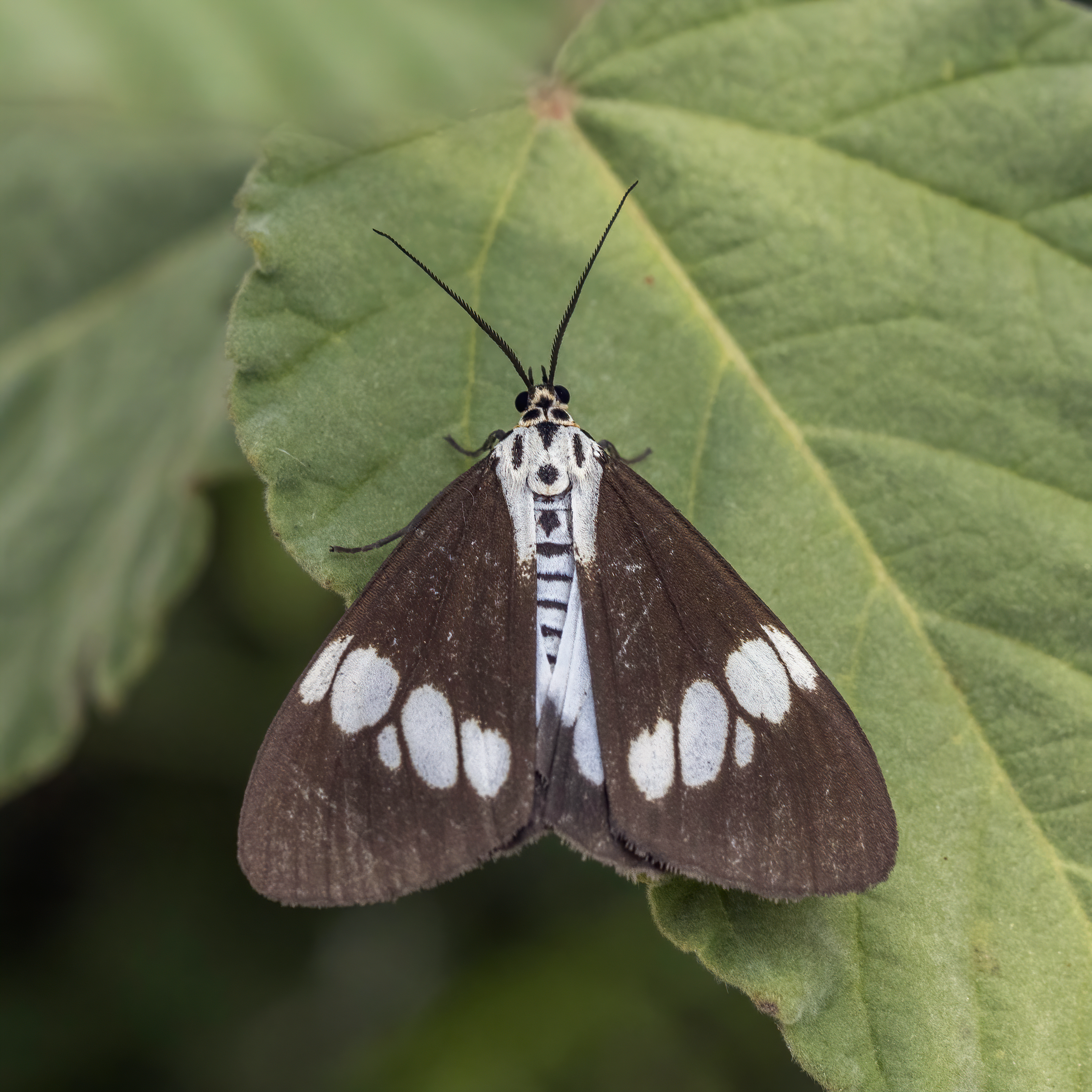

Scientific classification
- Kingdom: Animalia
- Phylum: Arthropoda
- Class: Insecta
- Order: Lepidoptera
- Superfamily: Noctuoidea
- Family: Erebidae
- Subfamily: Arctiinae
- Genus: Nyctemera
- Species: N. lacticinia

Binomial name
- Nyctemera lacticinia Grote, 1873

Synonyms
- Phalaena Geometra lacticinia Cramer, 1775; Deilemera latera Swinhoe, 1917; Deilemera homogona Swinhoe, 1917; Nyctemera latistriga simplicior Bryk, 1937

= Nyctemera lacticinia =

Common nyctemera

Species of moth

Nyctemera lacticinia, the common nyctemera, is a species of moth inf the family Erebidae. The species was first described by Augustus Radcliffe Grote in 1873. It is found in Japan, from the Oriental tropics of India, Sri Lanka, Myanmar to Taiwan, Peninsular Malaysia and Borneo.

== Description ==
The wingspan is about 45 mm. Male absent a tuft of hair on the tibia of foreleg. Head, collar and thorax yellowish white and spotted with black. Abdomen white where the extremity is yellowish. Three black spots on the first segment and slight black bands on the next sex above can be seen. Two paired series of lateral black spots. Forewing hair-brownish. A broad white streak found on the base of inner margin. An oblique post-medial band of five white spots present. Hindwings white with a broad marginal brown band with irregularly curved inner edge.

Larva dull reddish with a dorsal and two lateral series of radiating tufts of fine black hairs arising from black tubercles. Two long forwardly projecting tufts are present on first somite. Pupa reddish brown where rolled-up leaf.

The larvae feed on Santalum species.
