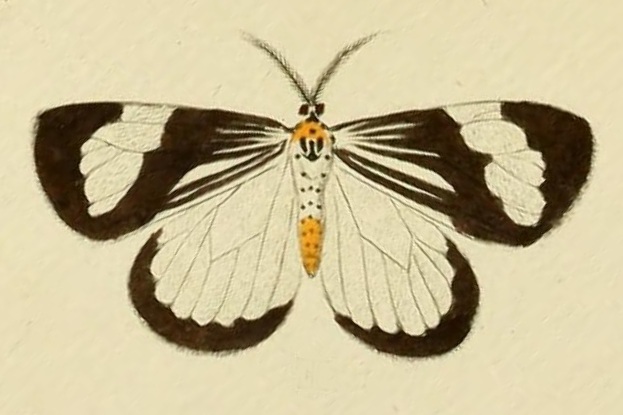
- Illustration from Cramer and Stoll's De Uitlandsche Kapellen, 1779

Scientific classification
- Kingdom: Animalia
- Phylum: Arthropoda
- Class: Insecta
- Order: Lepidoptera
- Superfamily: Noctuoidea
- Family: Erebidae
- Subfamily: Arctiinae
- Genus: Nyctemera
- Species: N. tripunctaria

Binomial name
- Nyctemera tripunctaria (Linnaeus, 1758)

Synonyms
- Phalaena Geometra tripunctaria Linnaeus, 1758; Phalaena petulca Linnaeus, 1768; Nyctemera atralba Hübner, [1820]; Nyctemera perconfusa Roepke, 1948 [1949]; Deilemera aequimargo Rothschild, 1920; Nyctemera tripunctaria elzuniaekruscheae Bryk, 1937; Leptosoma assimile Snellen van Vollenhoven, 1863; Leptosoma confusum Swinhoe, 1892; Leptosoma kondekum Swinhoe, 1892; Deilemera coequalis Swinhoe, 1915; Deilemera absurdum strictifascia Rothschild, 1915; Nyctemera celsa Walker, 1864; Nyctemera tripunctaria candidissima Seitz, 1915; Nyctemera cydippe Weymer, 1885; Deilemera niasana Swinhoe, 1906; Deilemera optata Swinhoe, 1903; Deilemera lombokiana Swinhoe, 1903; Nyctemera floresicola Roepke, 1954; Nyctemera subvelata Walker, 1864; Nyctemera velans Walker, 1864; Leptosoma infuscata Hopffer, 1874

= Nyctemera tripunctaria =

Species of moth

Nyctemera tripunctaria is a moth of the family Erebidae first described by Carl Linnaeus in his 1758 10th edition of Systema Naturae. It is found in southern China, Cambodia, Thailand, Vietnam, Sundaland, the Philippines and on Sulawesi.

Adults are day flying.

== Subspecies ==
- Nyctemera tripunctaria tripunctaria
- Nyctemera tripunctaria aequimargo (Rothschild, 1920)
- Nyctemera tripunctaria assimile (Snellen van Vollenhoven, 1863) (Java)
- Nyctemera tripunctaria celsa Walker, 1864 (Cambodia, southern China)
- Nyctemera tripunctaria cydippe Weymer, 1885 (Nias)
- Nyctemera tripunctaria lombokiana (Swinhoe, 1903)
- Nyctemera tripunctaria simalura Roepke, 1957 (Simalur Island)
- Nyctemera tripunctaria subvelata Walker, 1864 (Sulawesi)
