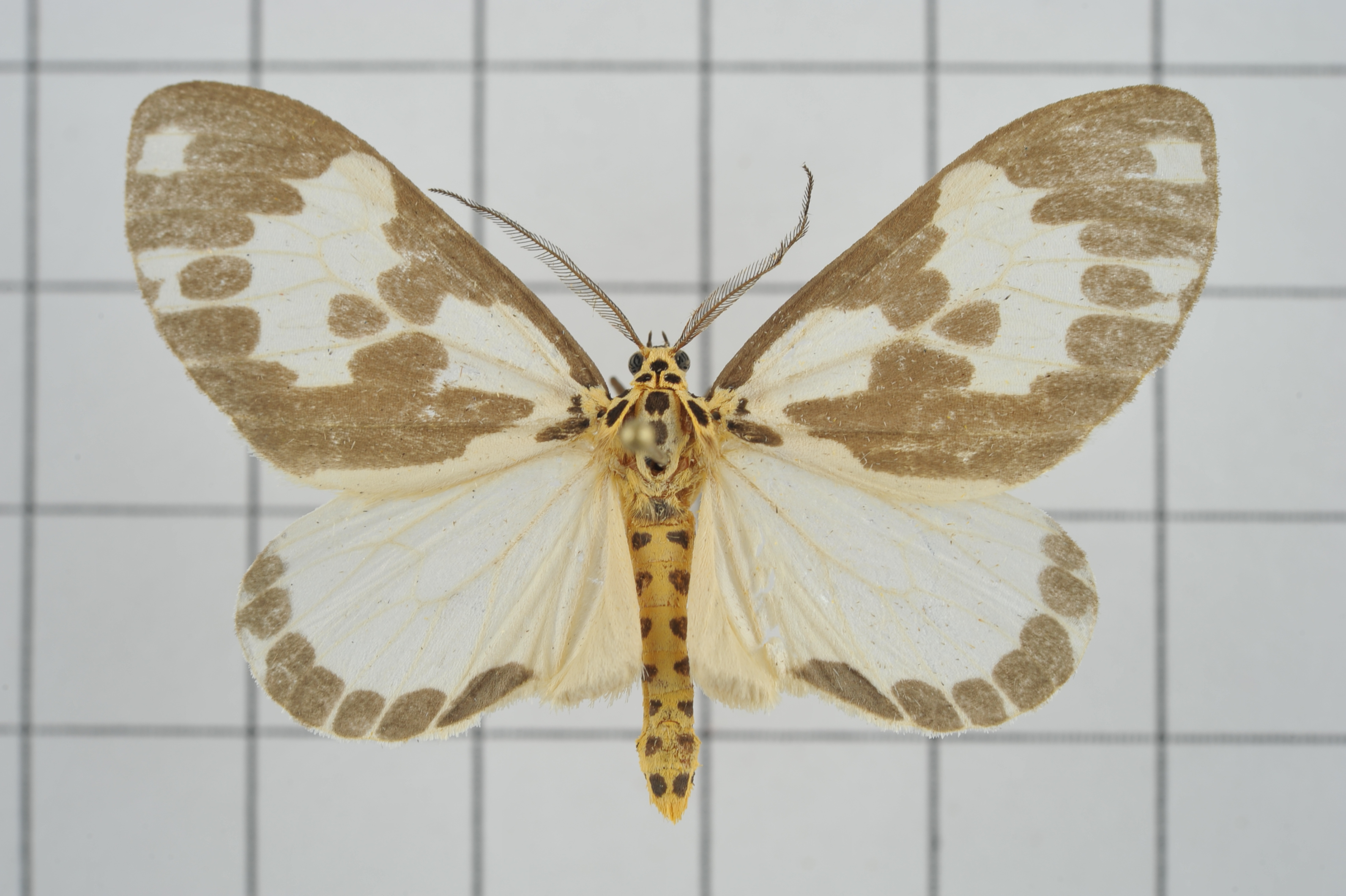
- N. c. formosana

Scientific classification
- Domain: Eukaryota
- Kingdom: Animalia
- Phylum: Arthropoda
- Class: Insecta
- Order: Lepidoptera
- Superfamily: Noctuoidea
- Family: Erebidae
- Subfamily: Arctiinae
- Genus: Nyctemera
- Species: N. carissima

Binomial name
- Nyctemera carissima (C. Swinhoe, 1891)

Synonyms
- Deilemera carissima C. Swinhoe, 1891

= Nyctemera carissima =

Species of moth

Nyctemera carissima is a moth of the family Erebidae first described by Charles Swinhoe in 1891. It is found in China (Zhejiang, Guangdong, Fujian, Hunan), north-eastern India, Nepal, Thailand, Malay Peninsula, Indonesia (northern Sumatra) and Myanmar.
