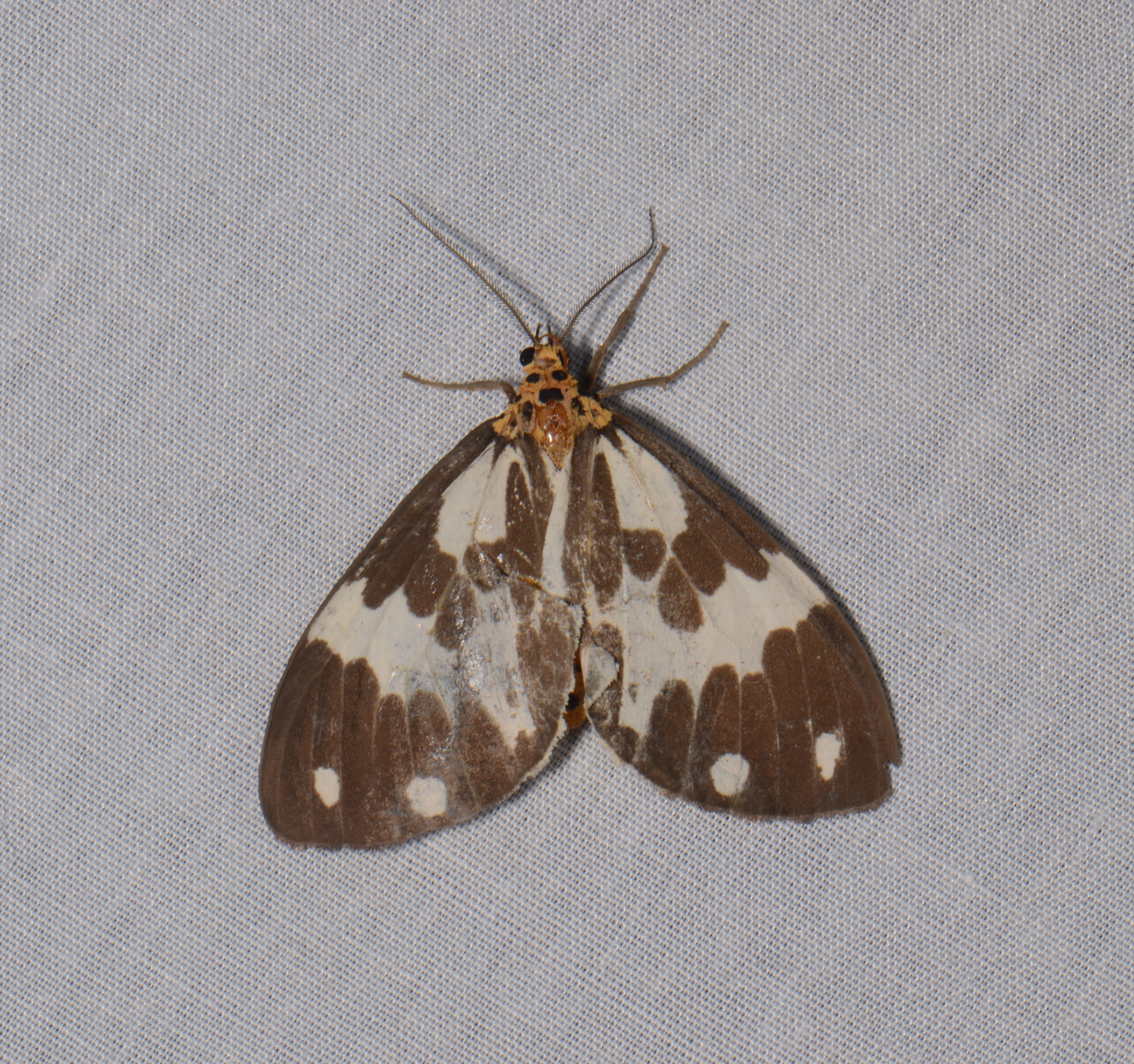

Scientific classification
- Domain: Eukaryota
- Kingdom: Animalia
- Phylum: Arthropoda
- Class: Insecta
- Order: Lepidoptera
- Superfamily: Noctuoidea
- Family: Erebidae
- Subfamily: Arctiinae
- Genus: Nyctemera
- Species: N. muelleri

Binomial name
- Nyctemera muelleri (Vollenhoven, 1863)

Synonyms
- Leptosoma mülleri Vollenhoven, 1863; Deilemera eddela Swinhoe, 1904; Nyctemera muelleri enganica Roepke, 1957

= Nyctemera muelleri =

Species of moth

Nyctemera muelleri is a moth of the family Erebidae first described by Vollenhoven in 1863. It is found on Sumatra, Peninsular Malaysia and Borneo, as well as in southern Myanmar, Thailand, Vietnam and the Philippines (Palawan, Tawitawi).

== Subspecies ==
- Nyctemera muelleri muelleri (southern Burma, Thailand, Vietnam, Malaysia, Sumatra, Borneo, Palawan, Tawitawi)
- Nyctemera muelleri eddela (Swinhoe, 1904) (Engano)
- Nyctemera muelleri mentawaiensis de Vos, 2002 (Mentawai, Sipora, Siberut)
