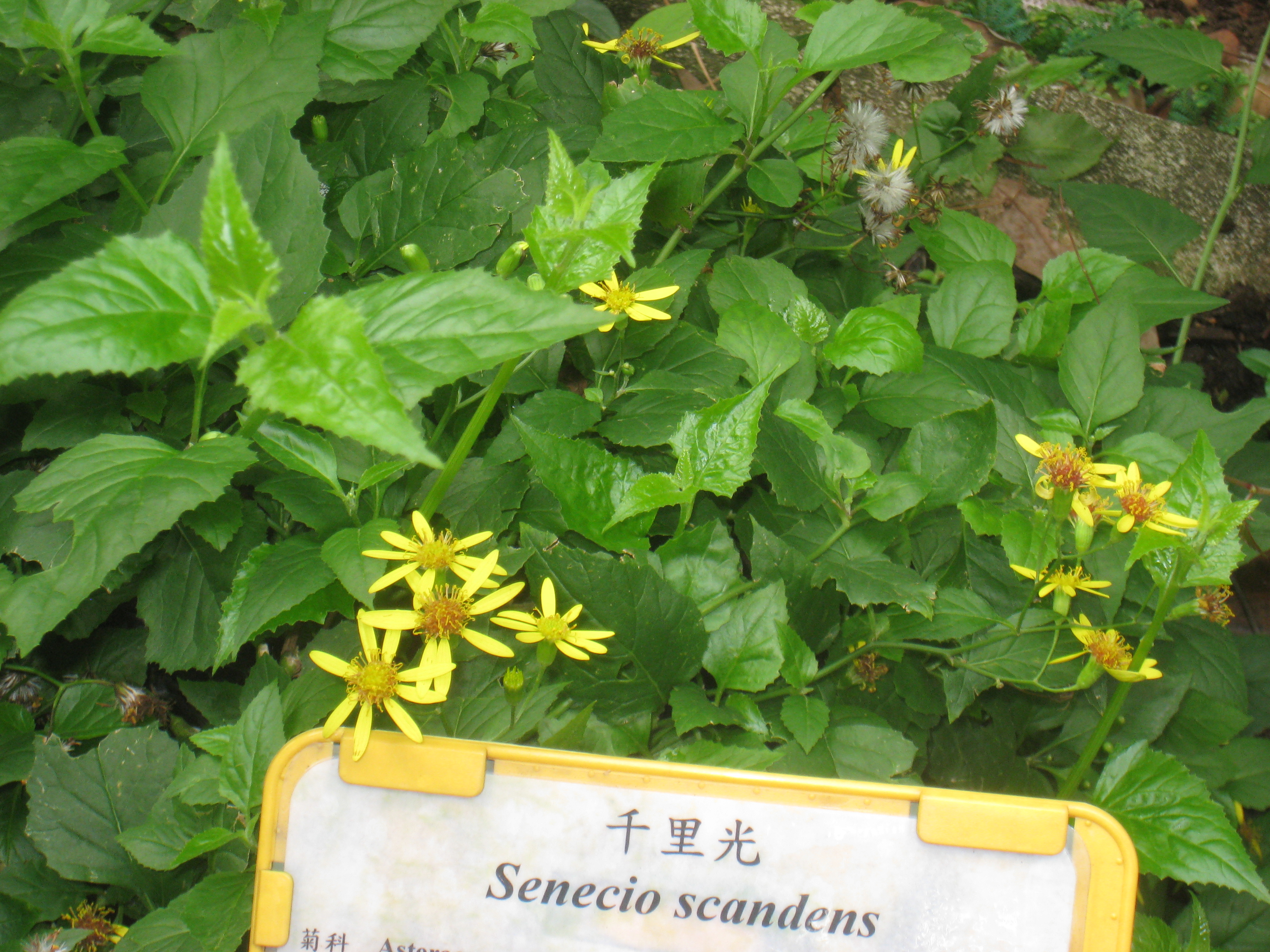
- Specimen in the Hong Kong Zoological and Botanical Gardens

Conservation status
- Least Concern (IUCN 3.1)

Scientific classification
- Kingdom: Plantae
- Clade: Tracheophytes
- Clade: Angiosperms
- Clade: Eudicots
- Clade: Asterids
- Order: Asterales
- Family: Asteraceae
- Genus: Senecio
- Species: S. scandens

Binomial name
- Senecio scandens Buch.-Ham. (1825)

= Senecio scandens =

Species of vine

Senecio scandens, also known as climbing Senecio, is a climber in the family Asteraceae that is native to Southeast Asia and the Indian subcontinent.

== Description ==
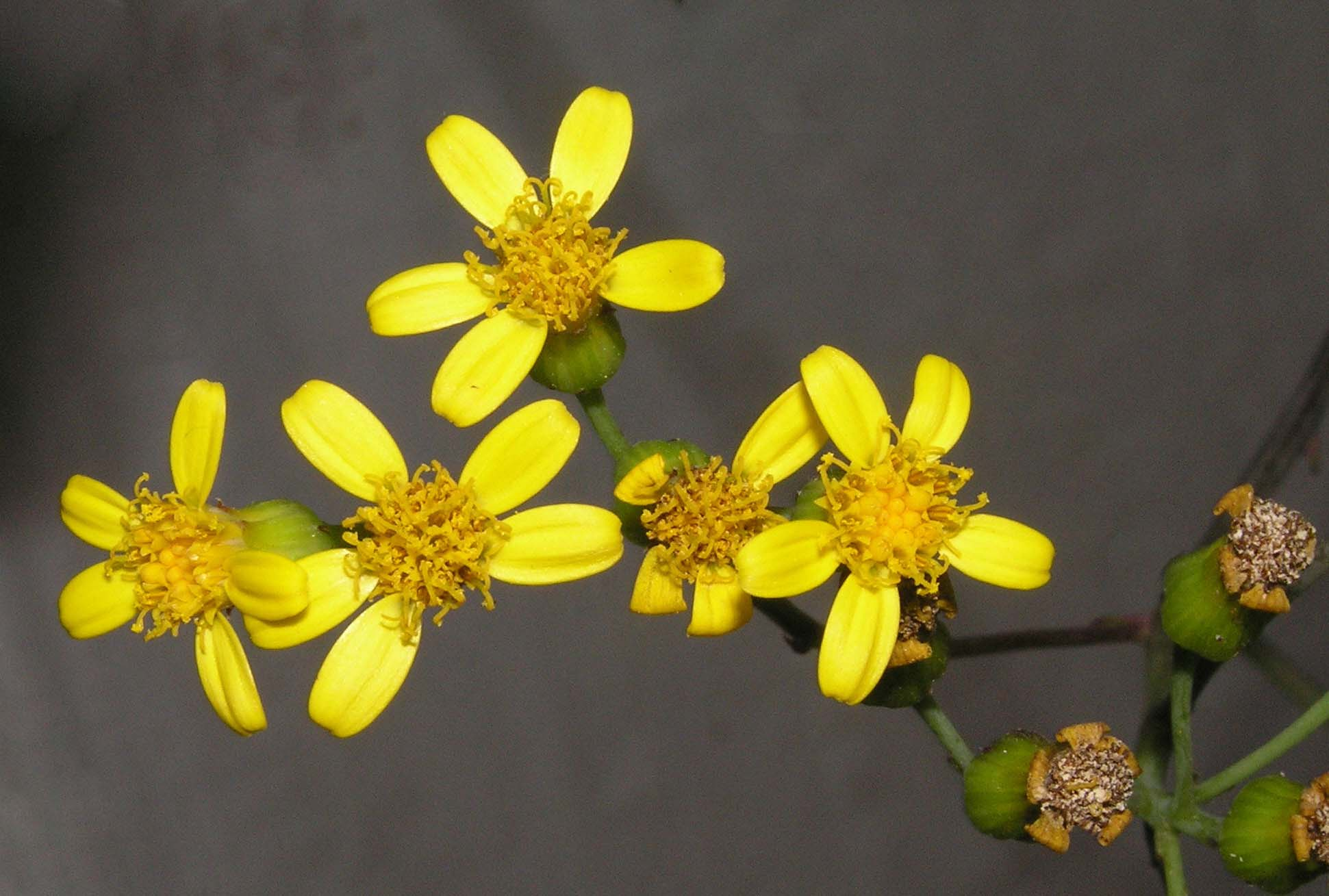
Flowers

Featuring a rhizomatous rootstock, it is a 2–5 metres long evergreen climber that produces slender, scrambling, multibranched woody stems. Frost-tender, it produces yellow daisy-like flowers which are borne in autumn.

== Distribution ==
The plant is native to China, southern Japan, Indian subcontinent, Myanmar, Thailand, Laos, Vietnam, Cambodia, Malaysia, Indonesia (Sulawesi), Philippines.

It is found in forests, brushwood, shrublands, rocks, near buildings, watercourses, on elevations from sea level to 4,000 metres at the highest.

== Medicinal usage ==
The plant is used as a medicinal herb in China, where it is a constituent of more than 100 herbal medicines. The plant contains pyrrolizidine alkaloids. Furthermore, many compounds are present, such as flavonoids, alkaloids, phenolic acids, terpenes, volatile oils and carotenoids, in addition to anti-inflammatory, antimicrobial, anti-leptospirosis, hepatoprotective, antioxidant, antiviral, antitumoral, analgesic, mutagenic, and toxicological activities.
