= Walter Karl Johann Roepke =

Walter Karl Johann Roepke (18 September 1882, Hohensalza – 7 February 1961, Wageningen) was a German entomologist who specialised in Lepidoptera and Coleoptera.

Roepke was born in Hohensalza now in Poland in a family of German origins. He was educated in the University of Berlin and the University of Zürich where he took his PhD degree in 1907 under Maximilian Standfuss (1854–1917). He worked under Standfuss after his degree and conducted experiments on the hybridization of moths. From 1908 to 1911 he was on the staff of the Experiment Station at Salatiga, in Java becoming acting director in 1911−12 and director from 1912 to 1918. From 1918 to 1919 he was entomologist at the Institute for Plant Diseases, Buitenzorg. He was keen on working in the tropics where he bred and studied the biology of numerous insects. Among his discoveries was Hypophryctis dolichoderella, a Tineidae that preyed on the larvae of Dolichoderus ants. He suffered from sprue and returned to the Netherlands and from 1919 he was professor at the Agricultural College, Wageningen. Although working mainly on agricultural pests and diseases he continued to study the lepidoptera of Southeast Asia in his spare time. He published a series titled Rhopalocera Javanica. He retired in 1953.

Roepke was the author of entomological papers on the butterflies of Java and Indomalaya; he described many new taxa.

His collection of Hesperiidae from Indomalaya is in the Rijksmuseum van Natuurlijke Historie in Leiden.
