= List of moths of Seychelles =

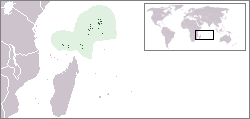
Location of the Seychelles

The moths of the Seychelles represent about 275 known species. The moths (mostly nocturnal) and butterflies (mostly diurnal) together make up the taxonomic order Lepidoptera.

This is a list of moth species which have been recorded on the Seychelles, a 115-island country in the Indian Ocean.

== Alucitidae ==
- Alucita melanodactyla Legrand, 1966
- Alucita seychellensis (T. B. Fletcher, 1910)

== Arctiidae ==
- Amerila aldabrensis (Freyer, 1912)
- Argina astrea (Drury, 1773)
- Eilema aldabrensis (Hampson, 1914)
- Eilema contorta Fryer, 1912
- Eilema lamprocraspis (Hampson, 1914)
- Euchromia folletii (Guérin-Méneville, 1832)
- Exilisia subfusca (Freyer, 1912)
- Mahensia seychellarum Fryer, 1912
- Nyctemera seychellensis (Hampson, 1908)
- Utetheisa lactea (Butler, 1884)
- Utetheisa lotrix (Cramer, 1779)
- Utetheisa pulchella (Linnaeus, 1758)
- Utetheisa pulchelloides Hampson, 1907

== Carposinidae ==
- Meridarchis caementaria Meyrick, 1911

== Choreutidae ==
- Choreutis gratiosa (Meyrick, 1911)

== Coleophoridae ==
- Blastobasis tabernatella (Legrand, 1966)

== Copromorphidae ==
- Copromorpha cryptochlora Meyrick, 1930

== Cosmopterigidae ==
- Bifascioides sindonia (Meyrick, 1911)

== Crambidae ==
- Aethaloessa calidalis (Guenée, 1854)
- Alytana aldabralis (Viette, 1958)
- Autocharis amethystina Swinhoe, 1894
- Autocharis barbieri (Legrand, 1966)
- Bocchoris inspersalis (Zeller, 1852)
- Cadarena pudoraria (Hübner, 1825)
- Chabulina putrisalis (Viette, 1958)
- Chrysocatharylla agraphellus (Hampson, 1919)
- Cirrhochrista mulleralis Legrand, 1957
- Cirrhochrista perbrunnealis T. B. Fletcher, 1910
- Cnaphalocrocis trapezalis (Guenée, 1854)
- Cnaphalocrocis trebiusalis (Walker, 1859)
- Condylorrhiza zyphalis (Viette, 1958)
- Conocramboides seychellellus (T. B. Fletcher, 1910)
- Crocidolomia pavonana (Fabricius, 1794)
- Diaphana indica (Saunders, 1851)
- Duponchelia fovealis Zeller, 1847
- Eurrhyparodes tricoloralis (Zeller, 1852)
- Glyphodes capensis (Walker, 1866)
- Glyphodes duponti de Joannis, 1915
- Haritalodes derogata (Fabricius, 1775)
- Hellula undalis (Fabricius, 1781)
- Herpetogramma licarsisalis (Walker, 1859)
- Hymenoptychis sordida Zeller, 1852
- Lamprosema aldabralis (Viette, 1958)
- Maruca vitrata (Fabricius, 1787)
- Microcrambon paphiellus (Guenée, 1862)
- Nomophila noctuella ([Denis & Schiffermüller], 1775)
- Noorda blitealis Walker, 1859
- Notarcha quaternalis (Zeller, 1852)
- Omiodes dnopheralis (Mabille, 1900)
- Omiodes indicata (Fabricius, 1775)
- Orphanostigma abruptalis (Walker, 1859)
- Palpita vitrealis (Rossi, 1794)
- Pessocosma prolalis (Viette & Legrand, 1958)
- Psara minoralis (Warren, 1892)
- Sameodes cancellalis (Zeller, 1852)
- Stemorrhages sericea (Drury, 1773)
- Stenochora lancinalis (Guenée, 1854)
- Udea ferrugalis (Hübner, 1796)
- Zebronia mahensis (T. B. Fletcher, 1910)

== Elachistidae ==
- Ethmia nigroapicella (Saalmüller, 1880)

== Gelechiidae ==
- Brachmia fuscogramma Janse, 1960
- Dichomeris hortulana (Meyrick, 1918)
- Dichomeris acuminata (Staudinger, 1876)
- Mesophleps safranella (Legrand, 1965)
- Faristenia tamarinda Bippus, 2020
- Thiotricha tenuis (Walsingham, 1891)

== Geometridae ==
- Casuariclystis latifascia (Walker, 1866)
- Chloroclystis gerberae Herbulot, 1964
- Chloroclystis mokensis Prout L. B., 1937
- Chloroclystis oceanica Herbulot, 1962
- Colocleora acharis Herbulot, 1962
- Comostola laesaria (Walker, 1861)
- Comostolopsis simplex Warren, 1902
- Comostolopsis sladeni Prout, 1915
- Comostolopsis stillata (Felder & Rogenhofer, 1875)
- Episteira mouliniei Legrand, 1971
- Erastria leucicolor (Butler, 1875)
- Erastria madecassaria (Boisduval, 1833)
- Eucrostes disparata Walker, 1861
- Gymnoscelis tenera Warren, 1901
- Idaea poecilocrossa (Prout L.B., 1932)
- Idaea pulveraria (Snellen, 1872)
- Isturgia deerraria (Walker, 1861)
- Ozola inexcisata Fryer, 1912
- Phaiogramma stibolepida (Butler, 1879)
- Problepsis deducta Herbulot, 1962
- Scardamia maculata Warren, 1897
- Scopula aspiciens Prout, 1926
- Scopula legrandi Herbulot, 1962
- Scopula minorata (Boisduval, 1833)
- Scopula serena Prout, 1920
- Scopula sparsipunctata (Mabille, 1900)
- Thalassodes antithetica Herbulot, 1964
- Thalassodes quadraria Guenée, 1857
- Xenimpia trizonata (Saalmüller, 1891)

== Glyphipterigidae ==
- Glyphipterix dichalina Meyrick, 1911
- Glyphipterix medica Meyrick, 1911

== Gracillariidae ==
- Acrocercops angelica Meyrick, 1919
- Acrocercops largoplaga Legrand, 1966
- Acrocercops martaella Legrand, 1966
- Acrocercops rhombocosma Meyrick, 1911
- Caloptilia megalaurata Legrand, 1966
- Caloptilia pentaplaca (Meyrick, 1911)
- Caloptilia prosticta (Meyrick, 1909)
- Caloptilia tirantella Legrand, 1966
- Cryptolectica euryphanta (Meyrick, 1911)
- Cuphodes tridora Meyrick, 1911
- Macarostola parolca Meyrick, 1911

== Immidae ==
- Imma francenella Legrand, 1966
- Imma quaestoria Meyrick, 1911

== Lymantriidae ==
- Euproctis pectinata (Freyer, 1912)

== Nepticulidae ==
- Stigmella tropicatella Legrand, 1966

== Noctuidae ==
- Achaea catella Guenée, 1852
- Achaea mercatoria (Fabricius, 1775)
- Achaea violaceofascia (Saalmüller, 1891)
- Acontia malgassica Mabille, 1881
- Acontia rachiastis (Hampson, 1908)
- Acontia transfigurata Wallengren, 1856
- Amyna axis Guenée, 1852
- Anomis flava (Fabricius, 1775)
- Anticarsia rubricans (Boisduval, 1833)
- Argyrogramma signata (Fabricius, 1775)
- Arsina silenalis Guenée, 1862
- Autoba costimacula (Saalmüller, 1880)
- Brevipecten malagasy Viette, 1965
- Callopistria maillardi (Guenée, 1862)
- Callopistria yerburii Butler, 1884
- Chalciope delta (Boisduval, 1833)
- Chasmina tibialis (Fabricius, 1775)
- Chrysodeixis chalcites (Esper, 1789)
- Condica conducta (Walker, 1857)
- Condica pauperata (Walker, 1858)
- Ctenoplusia limbirena (Guenée, 1852)
- Cyligramma latona (Cramer, 1775)
- Dysgonia angularis (Boisduval, 1833)
- Dysgonia torrida (Guenée, 1852)
- Erebus walkeri (Butler, 1875)
- Eublemma ragusana (Freyer, 1844)
- Eublemma rivula (Moore, 1882)
- Eublemmoides apicimacula (Mabille, 1880)
- Eutelia discitriga Walker, 1865
- Eutelia geyeri (Felder & Rogenhofer, 1874)
- Gesonia obeditalis Walker, 1859
- Gracilodes nysa Guenée, 1852
- Grammodes bifasciata (Petagna, 1787)
- Grammodes geometrica (Fabricius, 1775)
- Grammodes stolida (Fabricius, 1775)
- Helicoverpa armigera (Hübner, [1808])
- Hypena conscitalis Walker, 1866
- Hypena obacerralis Walker, [1859]
- Hypena varialis Walker, 1866
- Mocis conveniens (Walker, 1858)
- Mocis frugalis (Fabricius, 1775)
- Mocis mayeri (Boisduval, 1833)
- Mocis proverai Zilli, 2000
- Polydesma umbricola Boisduval, 1833
- Progonia matilei Orhant, 2001
- Progonia oileusalis (Walker, 1859)
- Rhesala moestalis (Walker, 1866)
- Rivula dimorpha Fryer, 1912
- Simplicia extinctalis (Zeller, 1852)
- Spodoptera cilium Guenée, 1852
- Spodoptera littoralis (Boisduval, 1833)
- Spodoptera mauritia (Boisduval, 1833)
- Stictoptera antemarginata Saalmüller, 1880
- Trigonodes exportata Guenée, 1852
- Trigonodes hyppasia (Cramer, 1779)

== Nolidae ==
- Bryophilopsis nesta T. B. Fletcher, 1910
- Earias biplaga Walker, 1866
- Leocyma discophora Hampson, 1912
- Nycteola mauritia (de Joannis, 1906)

== Notodontidae ==
- Iridoplitis malgassica Kiriakoff, 1960

== Oecophoridae ==
- Calicotis animula Meyrick, 1911
- Metachanda trixantha (Meyrick, 1911)
- Pachyrhabda tridora Meyrick, 1911
- Platactis hormathota Meyrick, 1911
- Stathmopoda auriferella (Walker, 1864)
- Stathmopoda biclavis Meyrick, 1911
- Stathmopoda daubanella (Legrand, 1958)
- Stathmopoda epilampra Meyrick, 1911
- Stathmopoda luxuriosa Meyrick, 1911
- Stathmopoda superdaubanella (Legrand, 1958)

== Psychidae ==
- Melasina tabernalis Meyrick, 1911

== Pterophoridae ==
- Hellinsia aldabrensis (T. B. Fletcher, 1910)
- Hepalastis pumilio (Zeller, 1873)
- Lantanophaga pusillidactylus (Walker, 1864)
- Megalorhipida leptomeres (Meyrick, 1886)
- Megalorhipida leucodactylus (Fabricius, 1794)
- Platyptilia claripicta T. B. Fletcher, 1910
- Platyptilia dimorpha T. B. Fletcher, 1910
- Sphenarches anisodactylus (Walker, 1864)
- Sphenarches caffer (Zeller, 1851)
- Stenodacma wahlbergi (Zeller, 1852)
- Stenoptilodes taprobanes (Felder & Rogenhofer, 1875)

== Pyralidae ==
- Ematheudes nigropunctata (Legrand, 1966)
- Endotricha decessalis Walker, 1859
- Endotricha mesenterialis (Walker, 1859)
- Endotricha vinolentalis Ragonot, 1891
- Etiella zinckenella (Treitschke, 1832)
- Hypsopygia mauritialis (Boisduval, 1833)
- Lepipaschia inornata Shaffer & Solis, 1994

== Sphingidae ==
- Acherontia atropos (Linnaeus, 1758)
- Agrius convolvuli (Linnaeus, 1758)
- Cephonodes tamsi Griveaud, 1960
- Daphnis nerii (Linnaeus, 1758)
- Hippotion celerio (Linnaeus, 1758)
- Hippotion eson (Cramer, 1779)
- Hippotion isis Rothschild & Jordan, 1903
- Hippotion osiris (Dalman, 1823)
- Macroglossum alluaudi de Joannis, 1893
- Nephele leighi Joycey & Talbot, 1921
- Temnora fumosa (Walker, 1856)
- Temnora peckoveri (Butler, 1876)

== Thyrididae ==
- Banisia aldabrana (Fryer, 1912)
- Banisia apicale (Freyer, 1912)
- Banisia tibiale (Fryer, 1912)
- Hapana carcealis Whalley, 1971

== Tineidae ==
- Afrocelestis lochaea (Meyrick, 1911)
- Amphixystis beverrasella (Legrand, 1966)
- Amphixystis crobylora (Meyrick, 1911)
- Amphixystis cyanodesma (Meyrick, 1911)
- Amphixystis ensifera (Meyrick, 1911)
- Amphixystis fricata (Meyrick, 1911)
- Amphixystis glomerata (Meyrick, 1911)
- Amphixystis hermatias (Meyrick, 1911)
- Amphixystis ichnora (Meyrick, 1911)
- Amphixystis irenica (Meyrick, 1911)
- Amphixystis lactiflua (Meyrick, 1911)
- Amphixystis multipunctella (Legrand, 1966)
- Amphixystis nephalia (Meyrick, 1911)
- Amphixystis polystrigella (Legrand, 1966)
- Amphixystis rhodothicta (Meyrick, 1911)
- Amphixystis rhothiaula (Meyrick, 1911)
- Amphixystis rorida (Meyrick, 1911)
- Amphixystis roseostrigella (Legrand, 1966)
- Amphixystis selacta (Meyrick, 1911)
- Amphixystis sicaria (Meyrick, 1911)
- Amphixystis tarsota (Meyrick, 1911)
- Archyala pagetodes (Meyrick, 1911)
- Crypsithyris concolorella (Walker, 1863)
- Erechthias calypta (Meyrick, 1911)
- Erechthias eurylyta (Meyrick, 1911)
- Erechthias flavistriata (Walsingham, 1907)
- Erechthias minuscula (Walsingham, 1897)
- Erechthias molynta (Meyrick, 1911)
- Erechthias polyplaga (Legrand, 1966)
- Erechthias scaligera (Meyrick, 1911)
- Erechthias zebrina (Butler, 1881)
- Eudarcia saucropis (Meyrick, 1911)
- Haplotinea insectella (Fabricius, 1794)
- Niditinea fuscella (Linnaeus, 1758)
- Opogona autogama (Meyrick, 1911)
- Opogona florea (Meyrick, 1911)
- Opogona harpalea Meyrick, 1911
- Opogona heliogramma (Meyrick, 1911)
- Opogona lornatella Legrand, 1966
- Opogona phaeochalca Meyrick, 1908
- Opogona sacchari (Bojer, 1856)
- Opogona sultana Meyrick, 1911
- Phereoeca allutella (Rebel, 1892)
- Pitharcha chalinaea Meyrick, 1908
- Proterodesma tomaea Meyrick, 1911
- Scalmatica rimosa Meyrick, 1911
- Setomorpha rutella Zeller, 1852
- Tinea coronata Meyrick, 1911
- Tinea cursoriatella Legrand, 1966
- Tinea milichopa Meyrick, 1911
- Tiquadra gypsatma (Meyrick, 1911)
- Trichophaga mormopis Meyrick, 1935

== Tortricidae ==
- Adoxophyes ergatica Meyrick, 1911
- Bactra legitima Meyrick, 1911
- Brachiolia amblopis (Meyrick, 1911)
- Coniostola stereoma (Meyrick, 1912)
- Crocidosema plebejana Zeller, 1847
- Cryptophlebia caeca Diakonoff, 1969
- Cryptophlebia peltastica (Meyrick, 1921)
- Cydia malesana (Meyrick, 1920)
- Cydia siderocosma (Diakonoff, 1969)
- Dudua aprobola (Meyrick, 1886)
- Eccopsis incultana (Walker, 1863)
- Eccopsis nebulana Walsingham, 1891
- Eucosma chlorobathra Meyrick, 1911
- Eucosma temenitis Meyrick, 1911
- Grapholita limbata Diakonoff, 1969
- Grapholita mesoscia Diakonoff, 1969
- Grapholita miranda (Meyrick, 1911)
- Grapholita rhabdotacra Diakonoff, 1969
- Herpystis physalodes (Meyrick, 1910)
- Herpystis rusticula Meyrick, 1911
- Lobesia vanillana (de Joannis, 1900)
- Megaherpystis eusema Diakonoff, 1969
- Metriophlebia chaomorpha (Meyrick, 1929)
- Neohermenias melanastraptis Diakonoff, 1969
- Olethreutes conchopleura (Meyrick, 1911)
- Olethreutes hygrantis (Meyrick, 1911)
- Phricanthes flexilineana (Walker, 1863)
- Selania exornata (Diakonoff, 1969)
- Statherotis leucaspis (Meyrick, 1902)
- Stenentoma chrysolampra Diakonoff, 1969
- Stenentoma onychosema Diakonoff, 1969

== Uraniidae ==
- Dirades theclata (Guenée, 1858)

== Yponomeutidae ==
- Argyresthia lustralis Meyrick, 1911
