= Oruza rupestre =

Scientific classification
- Domain: Eukaryota
- Kingdom: Animalia
- Phylum: Arthropoda
- Class: Insecta
- Order: Lepidoptera
- Superfamily: Noctuoidea
- Family: Erebidae
- Genus: Oruza
- Species: O. rupestre

Binomial name
- Oruza rupestre Fryer, 1912

Species of moth

Oruza rupestre is a species of moth of the family Erebidae. It is found in Seychelles.

== See also ==
- List of moths of the Seychelles
