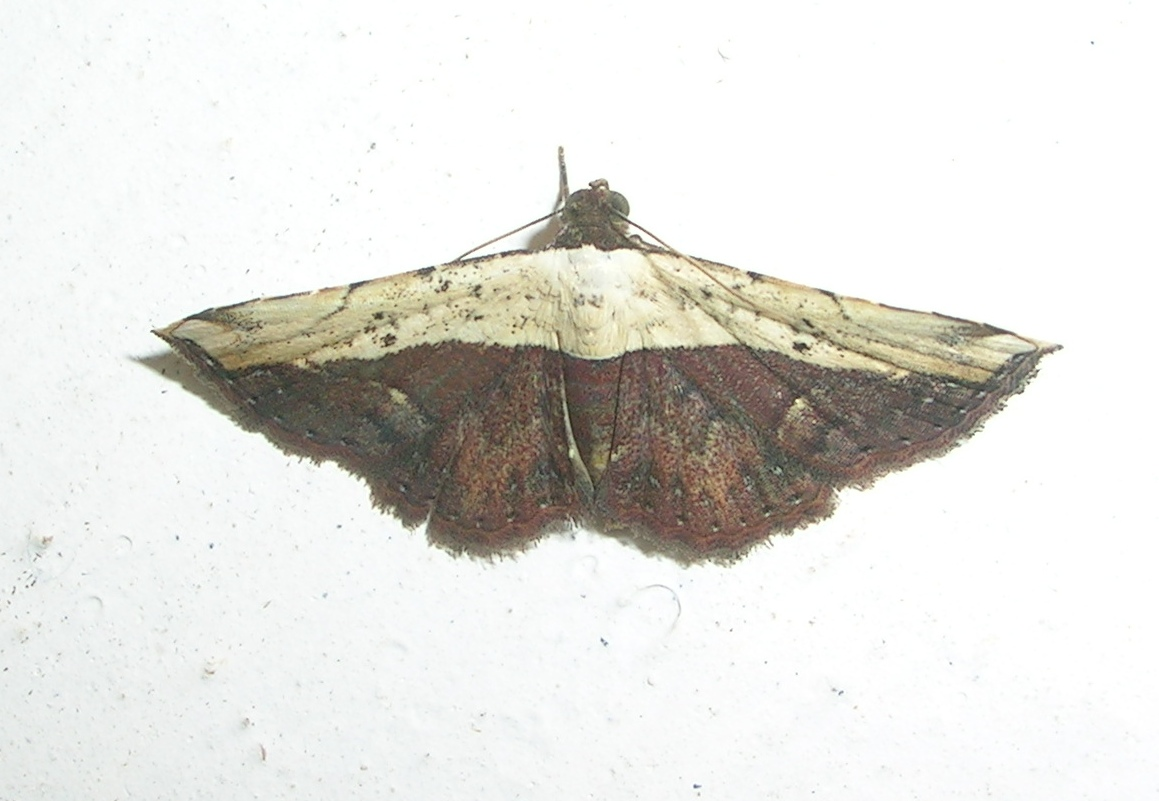

Scientific classification
- Kingdom: Animalia
- Phylum: Arthropoda
- Class: Insecta
- Order: Lepidoptera
- Superfamily: Noctuoidea
- Family: Erebidae
- Genus: Oruza
- Species: O. divisa

Binomial name
- Oruza divisa (Walker, 1862)

Synonyms
- Selenis divisa Walker, 1862; Selenis lauta Butler, 1878; Xanthoptera semirufa Snellen, 1880; Mestleta lathraea Holland, 1894; Zagira bicolora Bethune-Baker, 1906; Selenis semilux Walker 1865; Oruza semilux; Xanthoptera semifusca Snellen, 1880

= Oruza divisa =

Species of moth

Oruza divisa is a species of moth of the family Erebidae first described by Francis Walker in 1862. It is found in Asia, including Hong Kong, Sri Lanka, Sulawesi, Taiwan, Japan and in Africa south of the Sahara, including the Indian Ocean islands.

== Description ==
The wingspan is 16–20 mm. The body is red brown or black brown. Its head is blackish or chestnut. Thorax and costal area of the forewings are pure white, or suffused with reddish ochreous. Sub-apical markings are absent, the fascia being continued to the margin.

== Gallery ==
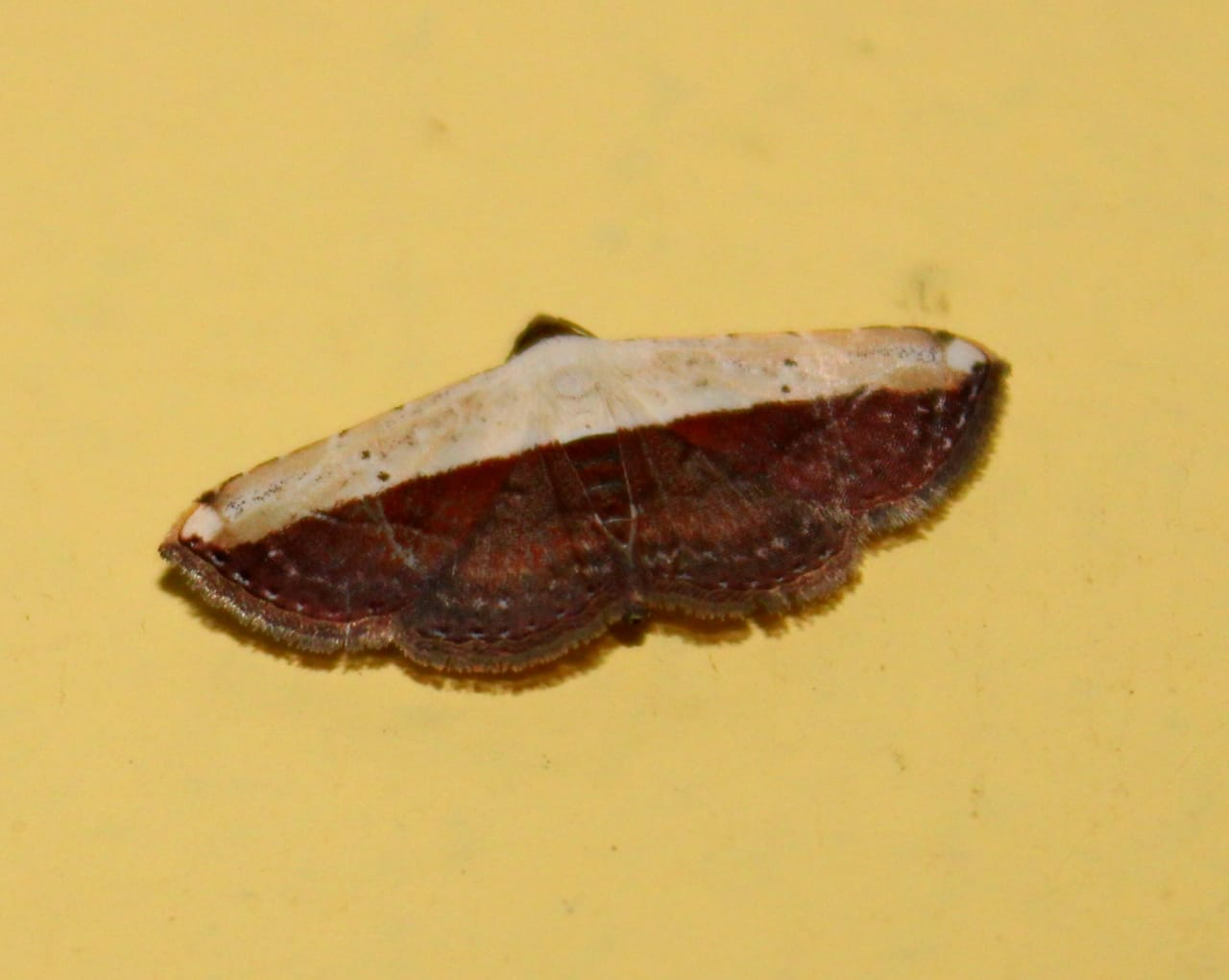
open winged position

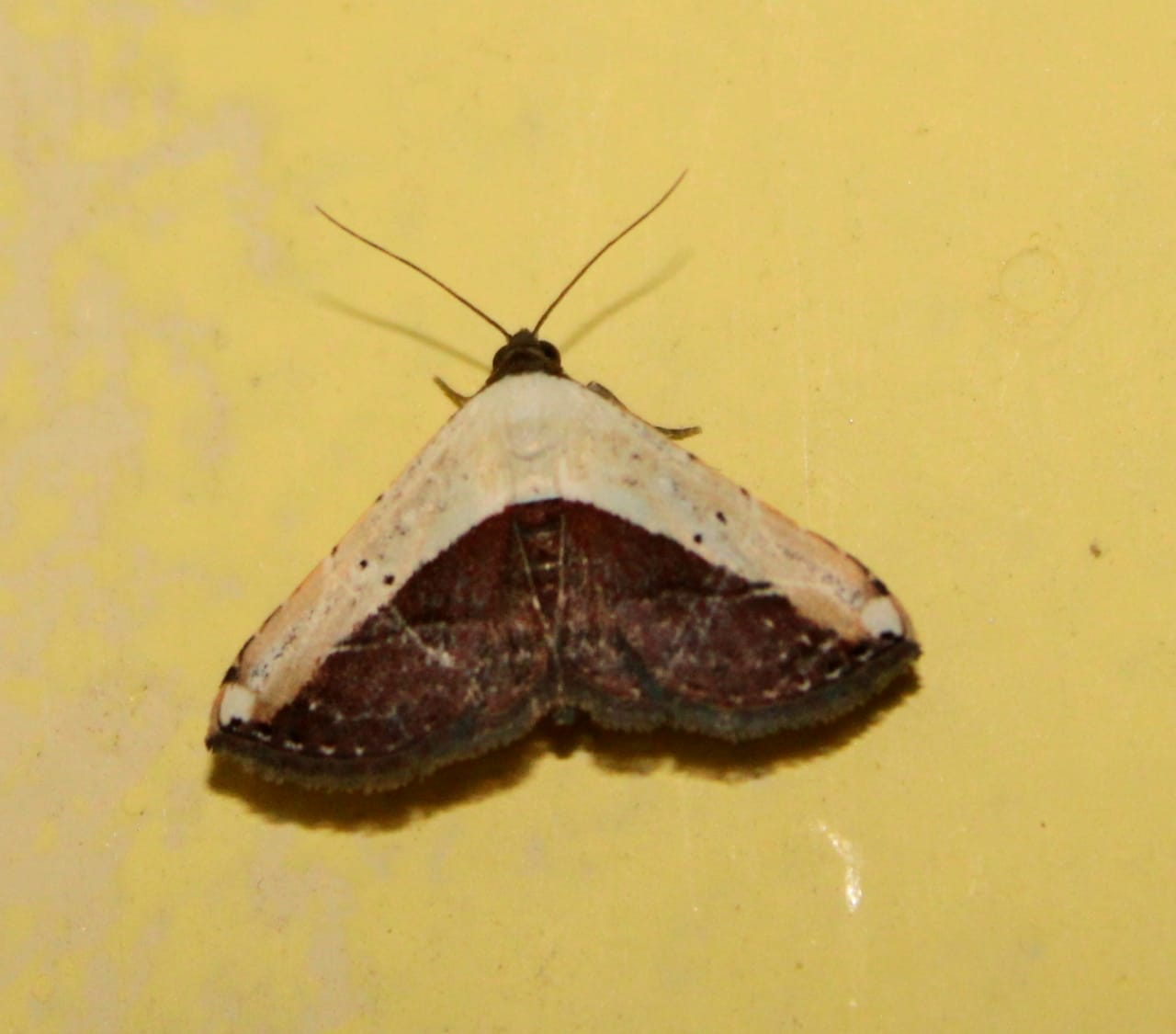
closed winged position
