= Pasiphilodes sayata =

Scientific classification
- Kingdom: Animalia
- Phylum: Arthropoda
- Clade: Pancrustacea
- Class: Insecta
- Order: Lepidoptera
- Family: Geometridae
- Genus: Pasiphilodes
- Species: P. sayata

Binomial name
- Pasiphilodes sayata (Holloway, 1976)

Synonyms
- Chloroclystis oribates sayata Holloway, 1976; Chloroclystis sayata Holloway, 1976; Pasiphila sayata

Species of moth

Pasiphilodes sayata is a moth in the family Geometridae. It is fendemic to Borneo. Their habitat consists of subsummit dwarf forests.
