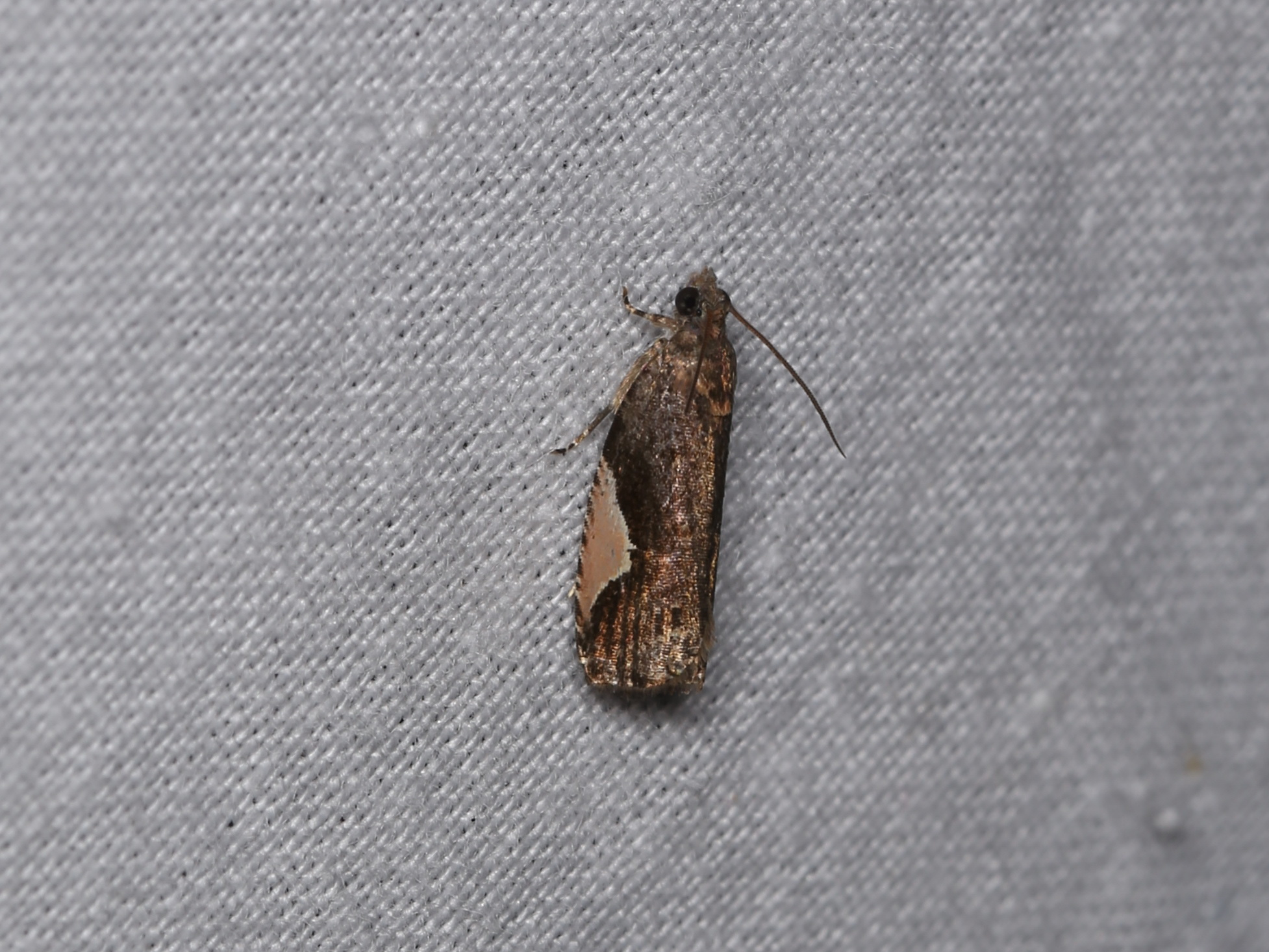

Scientific classification
- Domain: Eukaryota
- Kingdom: Animalia
- Phylum: Arthropoda
- Class: Insecta
- Order: Lepidoptera
- Family: Tortricidae
- Genus: Statherotis
- Species: S. discana

Binomial name
- Statherotis discana (Felder & Rogenhofer, 1875)

Synonyms
- Tortrix discana Felder & Rogenhofer, 1875; Argyroploce discana; Statherotis discana cuneata Diakonoff, 1973; Statherotis discana f. saturata Diakonoff, 1973

= Statherotis discana =

Species of moth

Statherotis discana, the litchi leafroller, is a moth of the family Tortricidae. It is found in Thailand, Taiwan, Japan, the Philippines, India, Java, the Solomon Islands, the Moluccas and New Guinea.

The wingspan is 14–16 mm.

The larvae feed on Litchi chinensis and Nephelium lappaceum.
