= Afrocelestis =

Scientific classification
- Kingdom: Animalia
- Phylum: Arthropoda
- Clade: Pancrustacea
- Class: Insecta
- Order: Lepidoptera
- Family: Tineidae
- Subfamily: Scardiinae
- Genus: Afrocelestis; Gozmány, 1965

Type species
- Afrocelestis evertata Gozmány, 1965

Genus of moths

Afrocelestis is a genus of moths belonging to the family Tineidae.

The name of this genus is derived from Africa+Celestis Meyrick.

It contains small species. Hairs loose, wings short and broad, cilia long. The species have whitish or yellowish ground coloration, the pattern is brownish, consisting of indistinct marginal spots and some transversal striae or stripes.

Male genitalia: resembling Celestica but uncus bilobate and strongly sclerotized. Tegumen very narrow dorsally, valvae tripartite into various shaped lobes of a complicate structure; no gnathos; aedeagus about as long as saccus, tubular and simple, no cornuti or coremata.

== Species ==
Some species of this genus are:

- Afrocelestis evertata Gozmány, 1965
- Afrocelestis inanis Gozmány, 1968
- Afrocelestis lochaea (Meyrick, 1911)
- Afrocelestis minuta (Gozmány, 1965)
- Afrocelestis sacculata Gozmány, 1968
