= Afrocelestis evertata =

Scientific classification
- Kingdom: Animalia
- Phylum: Arthropoda
- Clade: Pancrustacea
- Class: Insecta
- Order: Lepidoptera
- Family: Tineidae
- Genus: Afrocelestis
- Species: A. evertata

Binomial name
- Afrocelestis evertata Gozmány, 1965

Species of moth

Afrocelestis evertata is a moth of the family Tineidae. It was described by Hungarian entomologist László Anthony Gozmány in 1965 and is found in the Democratic Republic of the Congo.

The wingspan of this species is 10 mm. Head, scalp and thorax are light ivory grey with some yellowish suffusion. Its pattern is brownish but not too distinct: a spot on the shoulder, a triangular one at one-third on the costa, three other smaller spots on the costa in the apical third and three even smaller ones on the termen.

The types were provided from Elisabethville (now Lubumbashi) 27-ix-1937 (Ch.Speidel).
