= Pasiphilodes diaboeta =

Scientific classification
- Kingdom: Animalia
- Phylum: Arthropoda
- Clade: Pancrustacea
- Class: Insecta
- Order: Lepidoptera
- Family: Geometridae
- Genus: Pasiphilodes
- Species: P. diaboeta

Binomial name
- Pasiphilodes diaboeta (Prout, 1958)

Synonyms
- Chloroclystis diaboeta Prout, 1958; Pasiphila diaboeta

Species of moth

Pasiphilodes diaboeta is a moth in the family Geometridae. It is endemic to Seram.
