= Pasiphilodes chlorocampsis =

Scientific classification
- Kingdom: Animalia
- Phylum: Arthropoda
- Clade: Pancrustacea
- Class: Insecta
- Order: Lepidoptera
- Family: Geometridae
- Genus: Pasiphilodes
- Species: P. chlorocampsis

Binomial name
- Pasiphilodes chlorocampsis (Prout, 1926)

Synonyms
- Rhinoprora chlorocampsis Prout, 1926; Chloroclystis chlorocampsis; Pasiphila chlorocampsis

Species of moth

Pasiphilodes chlorocampsis is a moth in the family Geometridae. It is found on Peninsular Malaysia and Borneo. The habitat consists of mountainous areas.
