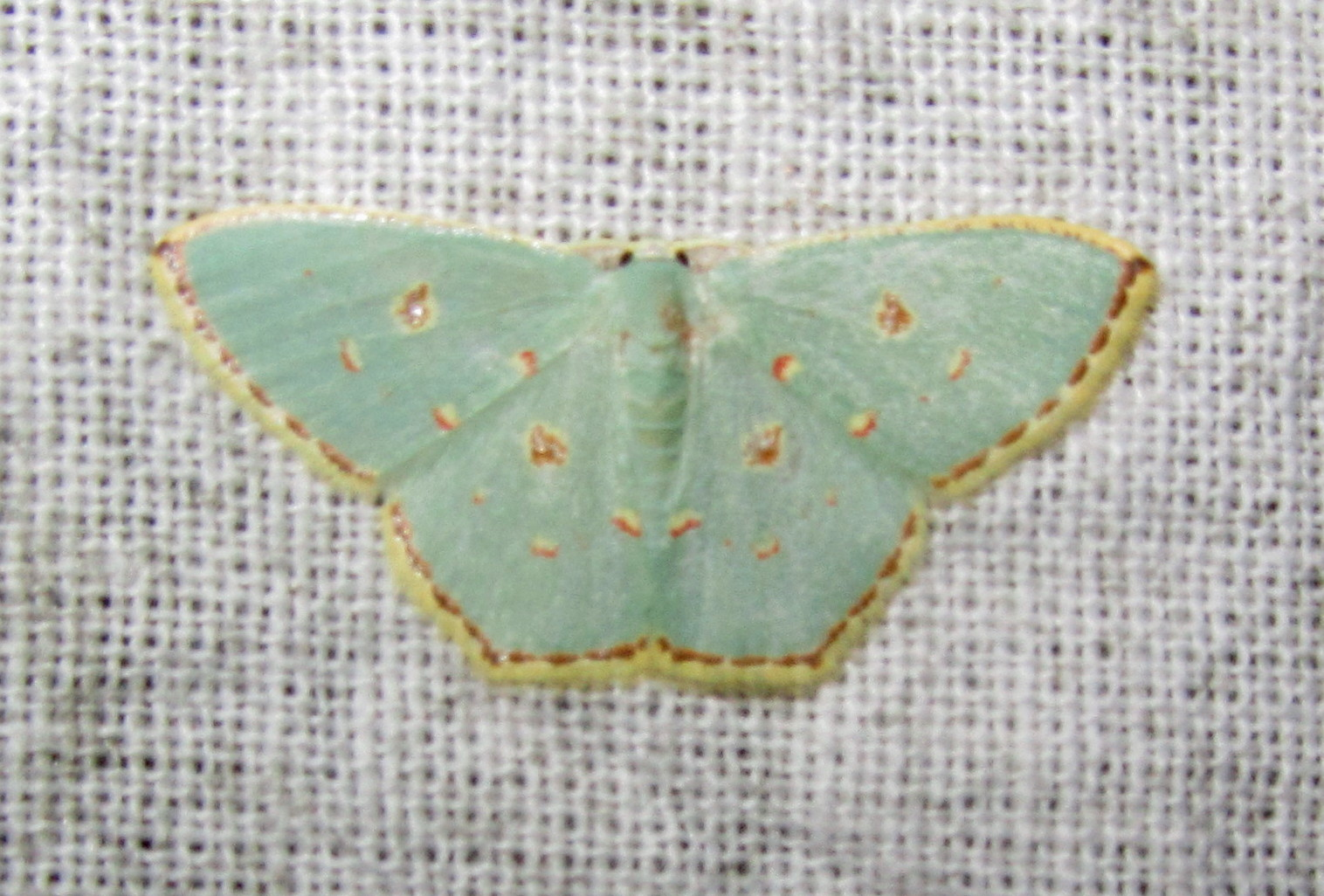
- Comostola laesaria

Scientific classification
- Kingdom: Animalia
- Phylum: Arthropoda
- Class: Insecta
- Order: Lepidoptera
- Family: Geometridae
- Tribe: Hemitheini
- Genus: Comostola; Meyrick, 1888

Synonyms
- Pyrrhorachis Warren, 1896; Leucodesmia Warren, 1899 (preocc. Howard, 1895); Chloeres Turner, 1910

= Comostola =

Genus of moths

Comostola is a genus of moths in the family Geometridae erected by Edward Meyrick in 1888. They are found primarily in Asia and Australia.

== Species ==
- Comostola cedilla Prout, 1917 New Guinea, Queensland, southern Moluccas, Sulawesi, Philippines, Borneo, Sumatra, Peninsular Malaysia
- Comostola chlorargyra (Walker, 1861) India, Andamans, Borneo, Java, Philippines, Sulawesi
- Comostola christinaria Han & Xue, 2009
- Comostola citrolimbaria (Guenée, 1857) Australia
- Comostola conchylias Meyrick, 1889 New Guinea
- Comibaena dispansa Walker, 1861 India
- Comostola dyakaria (Walker, 1861) Borneo, Philippines, Sumatra, Peninsular Malaysia, north-eastern Himalayas
- Comostola enodata Holloway, 1996 Borneo, Sumatra, Singapore, Sulawesi, New Guinea
- Comostola haplophanes Turner, 1910 Australia
- Comostola hauensteini Smetacek, 2004 Kumaon
- Comostola hypotyphla Prout, 1917 India
- Comostola inops Prout, 1912 India
- Comostola iodioides (Lucas, 1891) Australia
- Comostola laesaria (Walker, 1861) Sri Lanka, India, Indochina, southern China, Taiwan, Sundaland, northern Australia, Bismarck Archipelago
- Comostola leucomerata (Walker, 1866) Australia
- Comostola maculata (Moore, 1867) India
- Comostola meritaria (Walker, 1861) Sri Lanka, Taiwan, Sumatra, Borneo,
- Comostola minutata (Druce, 1888) Solomons, Bismarck Archipelago
- Comostola mundata Warren, 1896 India
- Comostola nereidaria (Snellen, 1881) Sulawesi, Borneo, New Guinea, Bismarck Archipelago
- Comostola ocellulata Prout, 1920
- Comostola orestias Prout, 1934 Borneo, Peninsular Malaysia
- Comostola ovifera (Warren, 1893) India
- Comostola prasochroa (Turner, 1931) Australia
- Comostola pyrrhogona (Walker, 1866) India, Indochina, southern China, Taiwan, Vanuatu, New Caledonia, northern Australia, Norfolk Island
- Comostola quantula (Swinhoe, 1886)
- Comostola rhodometopa (Prout, 1913)
- Comostola rhodoselas (Prout, 1928) Samoa, Fiji
- Comostola satoi Inoue, 1986
- Comostola simplex (Warren, 1899) Java
- Comostola stueningi Tautel & Barrion-Dupo, 2017
- Comostola subtiliaria (Bremer, 1864) south-eastern Siberia, Korea, north-eastern Himalayas, southern China
- Comostola turgescens (Prout, 1917) north-eastern Himalayas, Sundaland, Sulawesi
- Comostola virago Prout, 1926 India
- Comostola viridula (Warren, 1903)
