= Statherotis euryphaea =

Scientific classification
- Domain: Eukaryota
- Kingdom: Animalia
- Phylum: Arthropoda
- Class: Insecta
- Order: Lepidoptera
- Family: Tortricidae
- Genus: Statherotis
- Species: S. euryphaea

Binomial name
- Statherotis euryphaea (Turner, 1916)

Synonyms
- Argyroploce euryphaea Turner, 1916; Eucosma leuconephela Turner, 1946

Species of moth

Statherotis euryphaea is a species of moth of the family Tortricidae. It is found in Australia, where it has been recorded from Queensland and New South Wales.

The wingspan is about 18 mm. The forewings are fuscous brown, with some darker costal strigulae (fine streaks) and a brown-whitish dorsal streak. There is a brown spot on the mid-termen, with some brown terminal dots above and below it, as well as a series of dark fuscous dots on the dorsum. The hindwings are dark grey.
