= Chiromachla perspicua =

Scientific classification
- Kingdom: Animalia
- Phylum: Arthropoda
- Class: Insecta
- Order: Lepidoptera
- Superfamily: Noctuoidea
- Family: Erebidae
- Subfamily: Arctiinae
- Genus: Chiromachla
- Species: C. perspicua

Binomial name
- Chiromachla perspicua (Walker, 1854)

Synonyms
- Nyctemera perspicua Walker, 1854; Nyctemera fallax Holland, 1893

Species of moth

Chiromachla perspicua is a moth in the family Erebidae. It is found in Cameroon, the Democratic Republic of Congo, Equatorial Guinea, Gabon, Ghana, Guinea, Nigeria, Sierra Leone, Togo, Uganda and possibly Kenya.
