= Chiromachla transitella =

Scientific classification
- Kingdom: Animalia
- Phylum: Arthropoda
- Class: Insecta
- Order: Lepidoptera
- Superfamily: Noctuoidea
- Family: Erebidae
- Subfamily: Arctiinae
- Genus: Chiromachla
- Species: C. transitella

Binomial name
- Chiromachla transitella (Strand, 1909)

Synonyms
- Deilemera transitella Strand, 1909

Species of moth

Chiromachla transitella is a moth of the family Erebidae. It is found in Tanzania.
