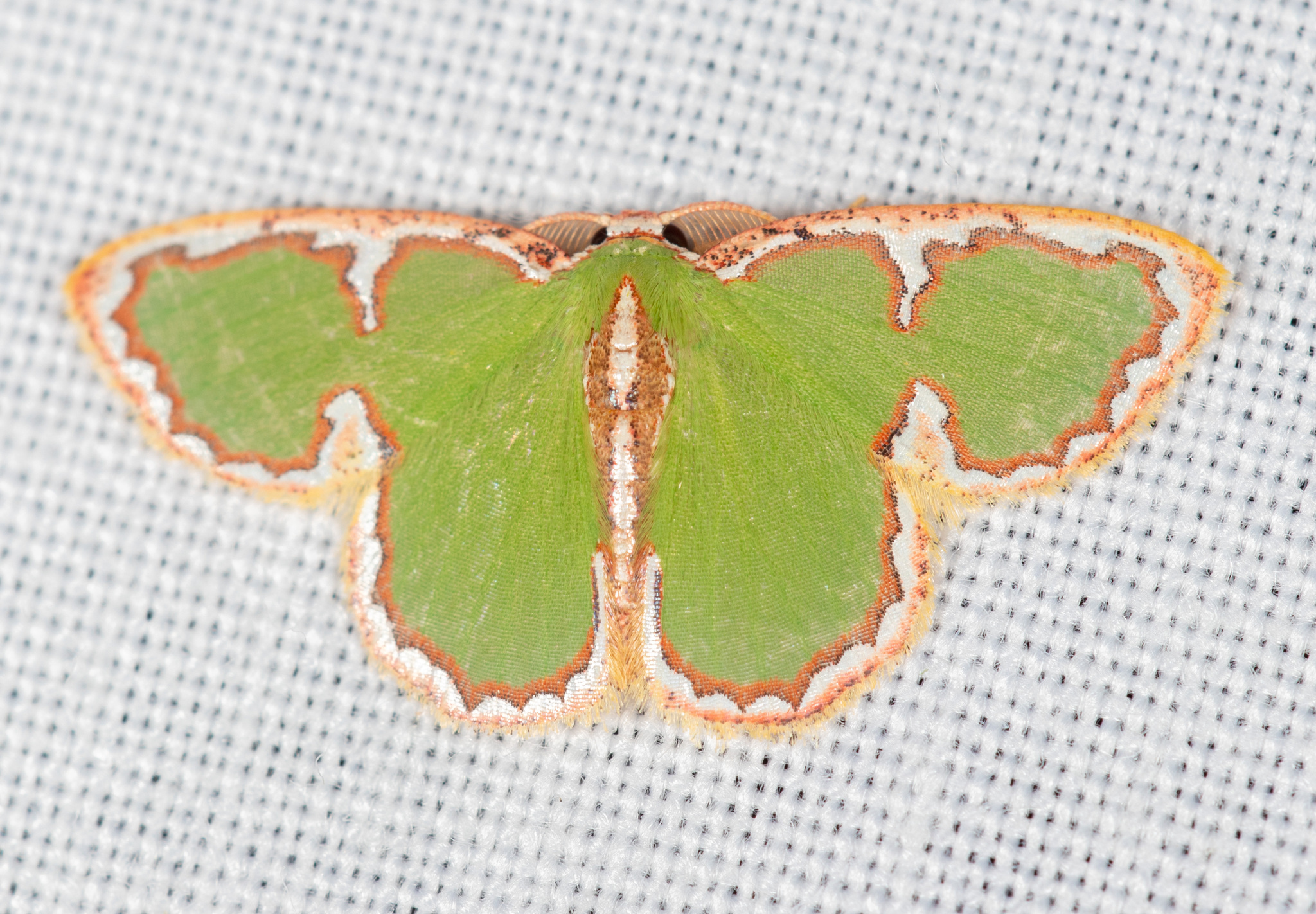

Scientific classification
- Kingdom: Animalia
- Phylum: Arthropoda
- Class: Insecta
- Order: Lepidoptera
- Family: Geometridae
- Genus: Comostola
- Species: C. chlorargyra

Binomial name
- Comostola chlorargyra (Walker, 1861)

Synonyms
- Comibaena chlorargyra Walker, 1886; Leucodesmia confusa Warren, 1905; Comostola hyptiostega Prout, 1935

= Comostola chlorargyra =

Species of moth

Comostola chlorargyra is a moth of the family Geometridae first described by Francis Walker in 1861. It is found in Sri Lanka, the Indian subregion, the Andaman Islands, Borneo, Java, the Philippines, Sulawesi and Australia.

Its wingspan is about 20 mm. It is generally a green moth with irregular white beaded wing margins outlined in brown. The caterpillar is known to feed on Cerbera species, such as Cerbera manghas.
