= Pasiphilodes rufogrisea =

Scientific classification
- Kingdom: Animalia
- Phylum: Arthropoda
- Clade: Pancrustacea
- Class: Insecta
- Order: Lepidoptera
- Family: Geometridae
- Genus: Pasiphilodes
- Species: P. rufogrisea

Binomial name
- Pasiphilodes rufogrisea (Holloway, 1976)

Synonyms
- Chloroclystis rufogrisea Holloway, 1976; Pasiphila rufogrisea

Species of moth

Pasiphilodes rufogrisea is a moth in the family Geometridae. It is found on Borneo.
