= Pasiphilodes viridescens =

Scientific classification
- Domain: Eukaryota
- Kingdom: Animalia
- Phylum: Arthropoda
- Class: Insecta
- Order: Lepidoptera
- Family: Geometridae
- Genus: Pasiphilodes
- Species: P. viridescens

Binomial name
- Pasiphilodes viridescens (Warren, 1895)

Synonyms
- Gymnodisca viridescens Warren, 1895; Pasiphila viridescens; Chloroclystis viridescens

Species of moth

Pasiphilodes viridescens is a moth in the family Geometridae. It is found in Malaysia, New Guinea and possibly Borneo.

The wingspan is about 20 millimetres (0.79 in). The forewings are green and the hindwings are pale cinereous, with traces of three or four dusky curved fasciae.

Larvae have been recorded feeding on Rhododendron species.
