= Pasiphilodes isophrica =

Scientific classification
- Kingdom: Animalia
- Phylum: Arthropoda
- Clade: Pancrustacea
- Class: Insecta
- Order: Lepidoptera
- Family: Geometridae
- Genus: Pasiphilodes
- Species: P. isophrica

Binomial name
- Pasiphilodes isophrica (Prout, 1926)

Synonyms
- Chloroclystis isophrica Prout, 1926; Pasiphila isophrica

Species of moth

Pasiphilodes isophrica is a moth in the family Geometridae. It is found on New Guinea.
