= Bifascioides =

Scientific classification
- Domain: Eukaryota
- Kingdom: Animalia
- Phylum: Arthropoda
- Class: Insecta
- Order: Lepidoptera
- Family: Cosmopterigidae
- Subfamily: Chrysopeleiinae
- Genus: Bifascioides; Kasy, 1968

Genus of moths

Bifascioides is a genus of moth in the family Cosmopterigidae.

== Species ==
- Bifascioides leucomelanella (Rebel, 1916)
- Bifascioides sindonia (Meyrick, 1911)
- Bifascioides yemenellus (Amsel, 1961)
