= Banisia tibiale =

Scientific classification
- Domain: Eukaryota
- Kingdom: Animalia
- Phylum: Arthropoda
- Class: Insecta
- Order: Lepidoptera
- Family: Thyrididae
- Genus: Banisia
- Species: B. tibiale

Binomial name
- Banisia tibiale (Fryer, 1912)

Synonyms
- Rhodoneura tibiale Fryer, 1912

Species of moth

Banisia tibiale is a species of moth of the family Thyrididae. It is found in the Seychelles on Marianne Island and Silhouette Island.

This moths remembers Banisia myrtaea (Drury, 1773) from which it can be distinguished by the swollen hind tibiae of the male. Their wingspan is 29–31 millimetres (1.1–1.2 in).
