= Statherotis decorata =

Scientific classification
- Kingdom: Animalia
- Phylum: Arthropoda
- Class: Insecta
- Order: Lepidoptera
- Family: Tortricidae
- Genus: Statherotis
- Species: S. decorata

Binomial name
- Statherotis decorata Meyrick, 1909

Species of moth

Statherotis decorata is a moth of the family Tortricidae first described by Edward Meyrick in 1909. It is found in Sri Lanka.
