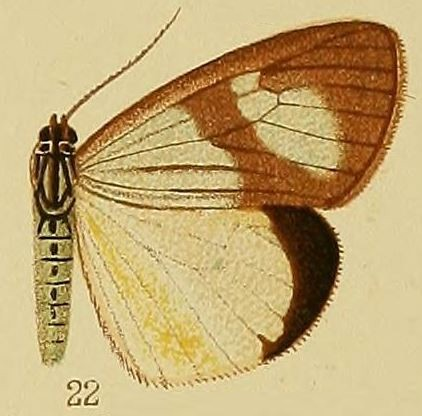

Scientific classification
- Kingdom: Animalia
- Phylum: Arthropoda
- Class: Insecta
- Order: Lepidoptera
- Superfamily: Noctuoidea
- Family: Erebidae
- Subfamily: Arctiinae
- Genus: Chiromachla
- Species: C. chalcosidia

Binomial name
- Chiromachla chalcosidia (Hampson, 1910)

Synonyms
- Deilemera chalcosidia Hampson, 1910; Deilemera chalcosidia var. seriatopunctata Aurivillius, 1925

= Chiromachla chalcosidia =

Species of moth

Chiromachla chalcosidia is a moth of the subfamily Arctiinae. It is found in the Democratic Republic of Congo and Uganda.

== Subspecies ==
- Chiromachla chalcosidia chalcosidia
- Chiromachla chalcosidia seriatopunctata (Aurivillius, 1925) (Democratic Republic of Congo)
