= Pasiphilodes automola =

Scientific classification
- Kingdom: Animalia
- Phylum: Arthropoda
- Clade: Pancrustacea
- Class: Insecta
- Order: Lepidoptera
- Family: Geometridae
- Genus: Pasiphilodes
- Species: P. automola

Binomial name
- Pasiphilodes automola (Prout, 1929)

Synonyms
- Chloroclystis automola Prout, 1929; Pasiphila automola

Species of moth

Pasiphilodes automola is a moth in the family Geometridae. It is found on Seram.
