= Statherotis afonini =

Scientific classification
- Kingdom: Animalia
- Phylum: Arthropoda
- Class: Insecta
- Order: Lepidoptera
- Family: Tortricidae
- Genus: Statherotis
- Species: S. afonini

Binomial name
- Statherotis afonini Razowski, 2009

Species of moth

Statherotis afonini is a moth of the family Tortricidae. It is found in Vietnam.
