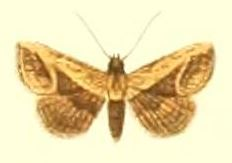

Scientific classification
- Domain: Eukaryota
- Kingdom: Animalia
- Phylum: Arthropoda
- Class: Insecta
- Order: Lepidoptera
- Superfamily: Noctuoidea
- Family: Erebidae
- Genus: Oruza
- Species: O. stragulata

Binomial name
- Oruza stragulata (Pagenstecher, 1900)

Synonyms
- Zagira stragulata Pagenstecher, 1900; Zagira strigulata (sic) Pagenstecher, 1900; Oruza pratti Bethune-Baker, 1906

= Oruza stragulata =

Species of moth

Oruza stragulata is a species of moth of the family Erebidae. It is found from Japan to Australia
