= Bifascioides yemenellus =

Scientific classification
- Domain: Eukaryota
- Kingdom: Animalia
- Phylum: Arthropoda
- Class: Insecta
- Order: Lepidoptera
- Family: Cosmopterigidae
- Genus: Bifascioides
- Species: B. yemenellus

Binomial name
- Bifascioides yemenellus (Amsel, 1961)

Synonyms
- Bifascia yemenella Amsel, 1961; Bifascia yemenellus; Bifascioides yemenella

Species of moth

Bifascioides yemenellus is a moth in the family Cosmopterigidae. It is found in Yemen and southern Iran.
