= Statherotis agitata =

Scientific classification
- Kingdom: Animalia
- Phylum: Arthropoda
- Class: Insecta
- Order: Lepidoptera
- Family: Tortricidae
- Genus: Statherotis
- Species: S. agitata

Binomial name
- Statherotis agitata (Meyrick, 1909)

Synonyms
- Proschistis agitata Meyrick, 1009

Species of moth

Statherotis agitata is a moth of the family Tortricidae first described by Edward Meyrick in 1909. It is found in Sri Lanka.
