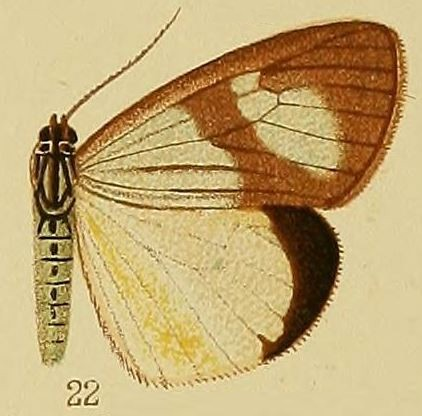
- Chiromachla chalcosidia

Scientific classification
- Domain: Eukaryota
- Kingdom: Animalia
- Phylum: Arthropoda
- Class: Insecta
- Order: Lepidoptera
- Superfamily: Noctuoidea
- Family: Erebidae
- Subfamily: Arctiinae
- Tribe: Arctiini
- Subtribe: Nyctemerina
- Genus: Chiromachla; Strand, 1909

= Chiromachla =

Genus of moths

Chiromachla is a genus of tiger moths in the family Erebidae.

== Species ==
- Chiromachla chalcosidia Hampson, 1910
- Chiromachla gracilis
- Chiromachla insulare
- Chiromachla leuconoe
- Chiromachla pallescens
- Chiromachla perspicua
- Chiromachla restrictum
- Chiromachla seychellensis
- Chiromachla torbeni
- Chiromachla transitella
