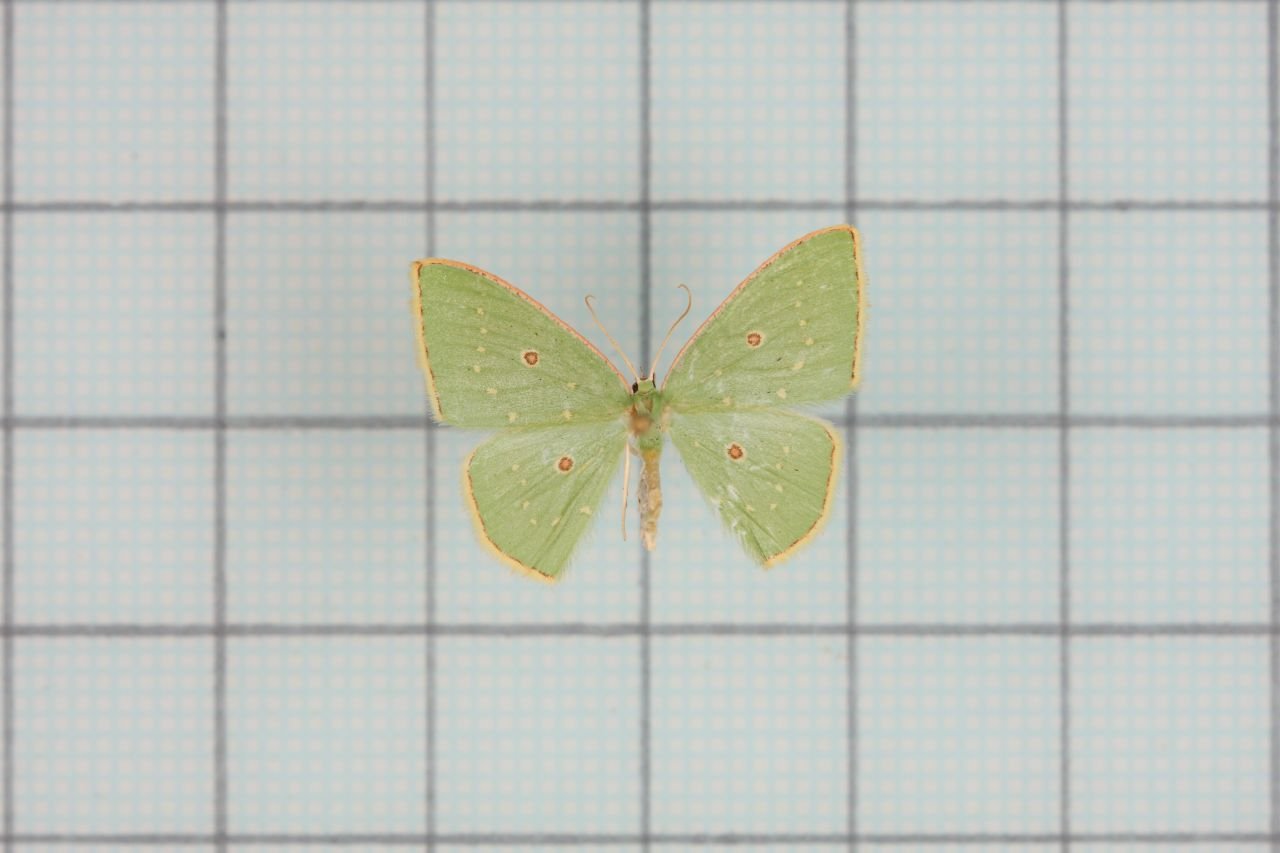

Scientific classification
- Kingdom: Animalia
- Phylum: Arthropoda
- Clade: Pancrustacea
- Class: Insecta
- Order: Lepidoptera
- Family: Geometridae
- Genus: Comostola
- Species: C. ocellulata

Binomial name
- Comostola ocellulata Prout, 1920

= Comostola ocellulata =

Species of moth

Comostola ocellulata is a moth of the family Geometridae. It is found in Taiwan.
