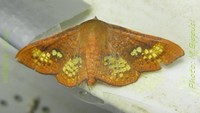

Scientific classification
- Kingdom: Animalia
- Phylum: Arthropoda
- Class: Insecta
- Order: Lepidoptera
- Family: Thyrididae
- Genus: Banisia
- Species: B. clathrula

Binomial name
- Banisia clathrula (Guenée, 1877)

Synonyms
- Striglina clathrula Guenée, 1877

= Banisia clathrula =

Species of moth

Banisia clathrula is a species of moth of the family Thyrididae. It is found in Mauritius and Réunion.

Its wingspan is around 35 mm.

== See also ==
- List of moths of Réunion
- List of moths of Mauritius
