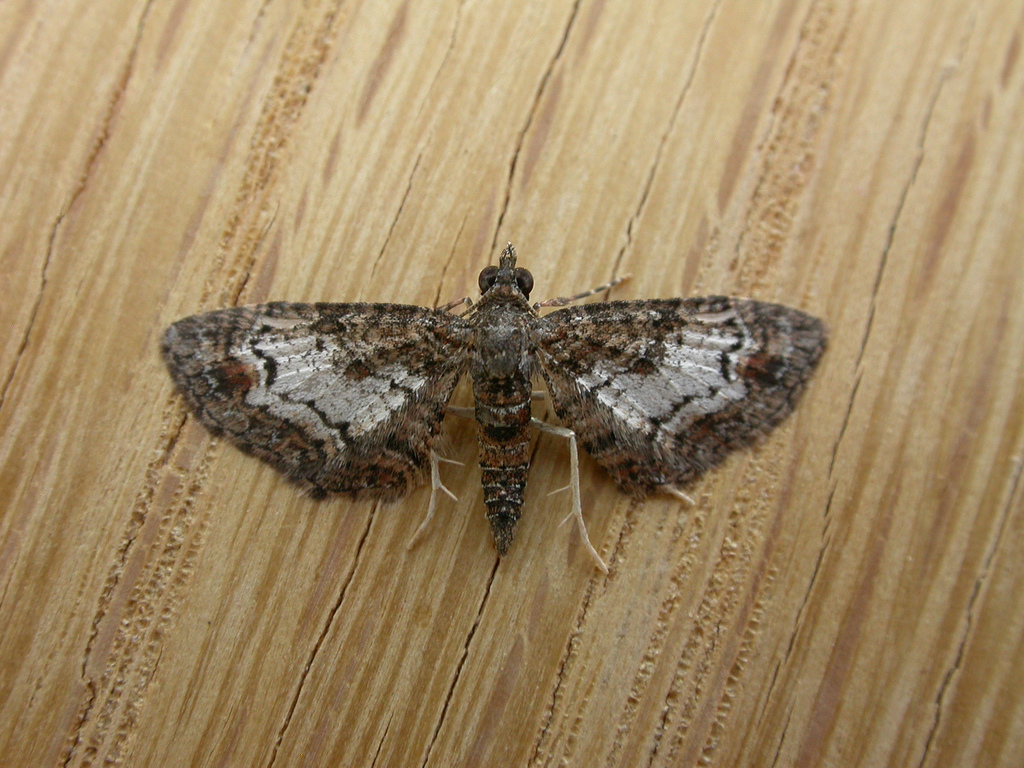
- Chloroclystis testulata

Scientific classification
- Domain: Eukaryota
- Kingdom: Animalia
- Phylum: Arthropoda
- Class: Insecta
- Order: Lepidoptera
- Family: Geometridae
- Subfamily: Larentiinae
- Tribe: Eupitheciini
- Genus: Pasiphilodes; Warren, 1895

= Pasiphilodes =

Genus of moths

Pasiphilodes is a genus of moths in the family Geometridae first described by Warren in 1895.

== Species ==
- Pasiphilodes automola
- Pasiphilodes chlorocampsis
- Pasiphilodes diaboeta
- Pasiphilodes diaschista
- Pasiphilodes eurystalides
- Pasiphilodes fractiscripta
- Pasiphilodes hypodela
- Pasiphilodes isophrica
- Pasiphilodes luteata
- Pasiphilodes nina
- Pasiphilodes regularis
- Pasiphilodes rubrifusa
- Pasiphilodes rufogrisea
- Pasiphilodes sayata
- Pasiphilodes subpalpata
- Pasiphilodes subtrita
- Pasiphilodes testulata
- Pasiphilodes viridescens
