= Pasiphilodes rubrifusa =

Scientific classification
- Domain: Eukaryota
- Kingdom: Animalia
- Phylum: Arthropoda
- Class: Insecta
- Order: Lepidoptera
- Family: Geometridae
- Genus: Pasiphilodes
- Species: P. rubrifusa

Binomial name
- Pasiphilodes rubrifusa (Warren, 1895)

Synonyms
- Gymnodisca rubrifusa Warren, 1895; Chloroclystis rubrifusa; Pasiphila rubrifusa

Species of moth

Pasiphilodes rubrifusa is a moth in the family Geometridae. It is found on Peninsular Malaysia and Borneo.
