= Pasiphilodes regularis =

Scientific classification
- Domain: Eukaryota
- Kingdom: Animalia
- Phylum: Arthropoda
- Class: Insecta
- Order: Lepidoptera
- Family: Geometridae
- Genus: Pasiphilodes
- Species: P. regularis

Binomial name
- Pasiphilodes regularis (Warren, 1895)

Synonyms
- Rhinoprora regularis Warren, 1895; Pasiphila regularis; Chloroclystis viridimargo Prout, 1958

Species of moth

Pasiphilodes regularis is a moth in the family Geometridae. It is found on Peninsular Malaysia.
