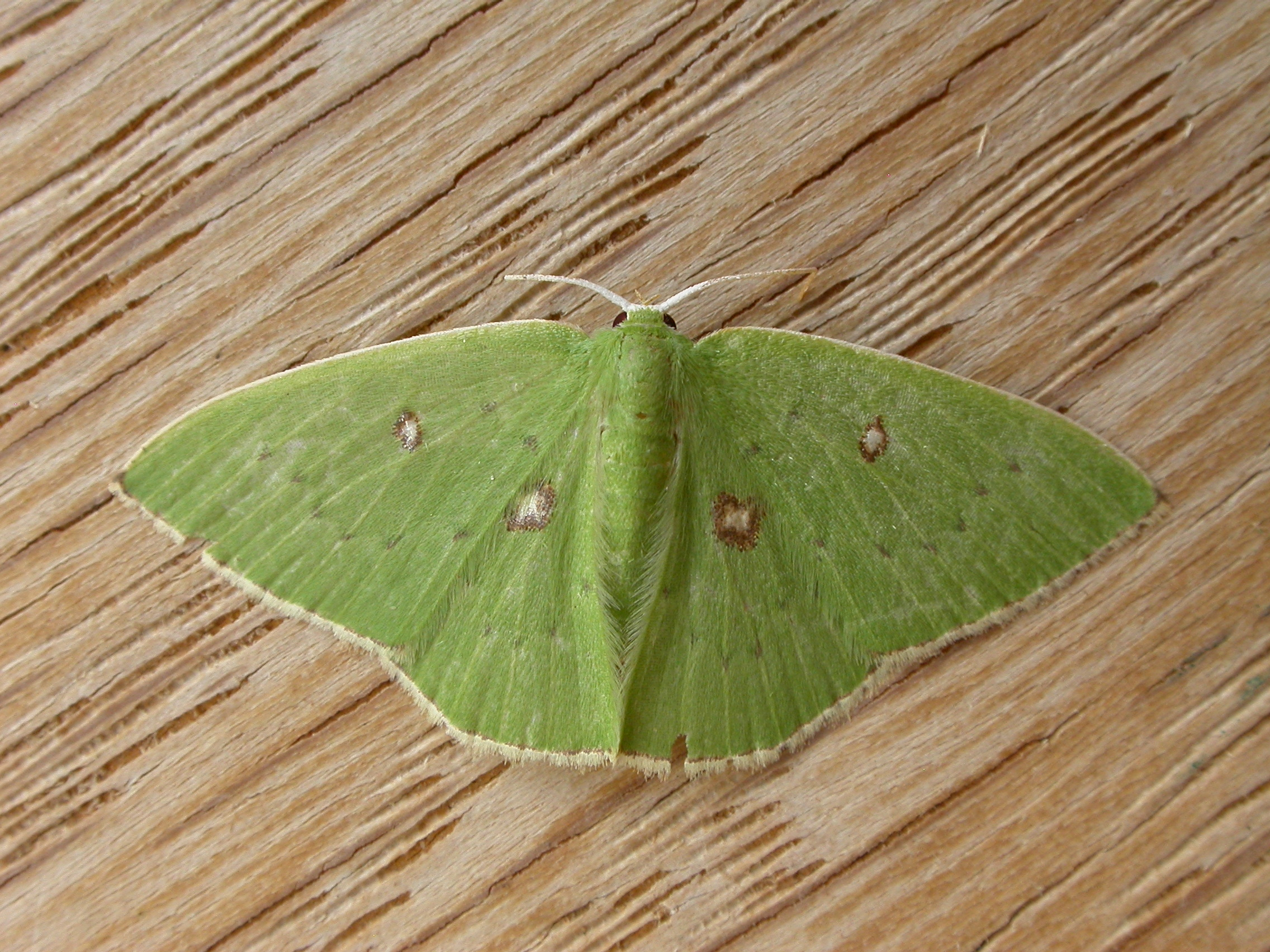

Scientific classification
- Kingdom: Animalia
- Phylum: Arthropoda
- Class: Insecta
- Order: Lepidoptera
- Family: Geometridae
- Genus: Comostola
- Species: C. leucomerata

Binomial name
- Comostola leucomerata (Walker, 1866)

Synonyms
- Chlorochroma leucomerata Walker, 1866

= Comostola leucomerata =

Species of moth

Comostola leucomerata is a species of moth of the family Geometridae. It is known from rainforests in New South Wales and Queensland.

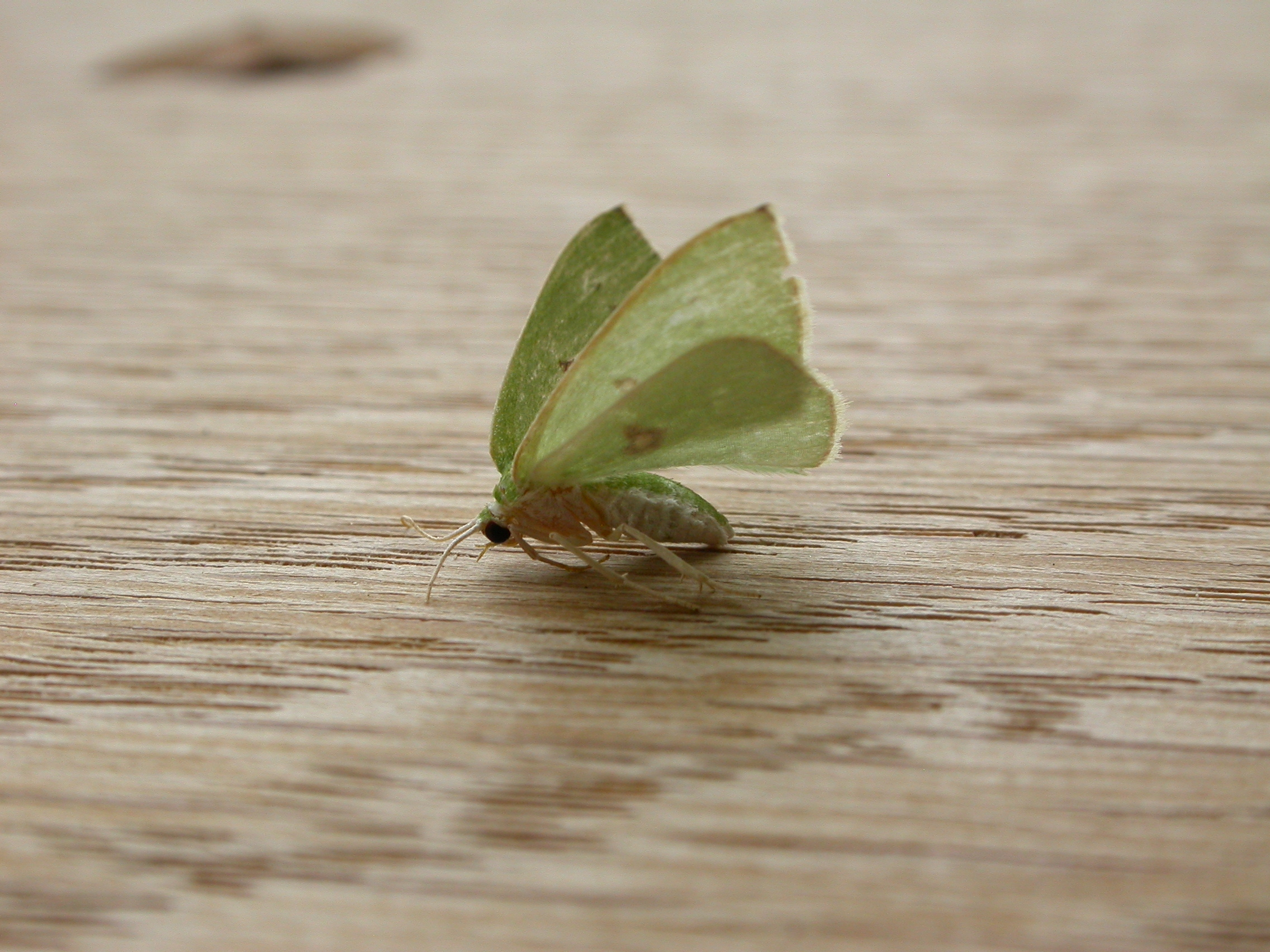
