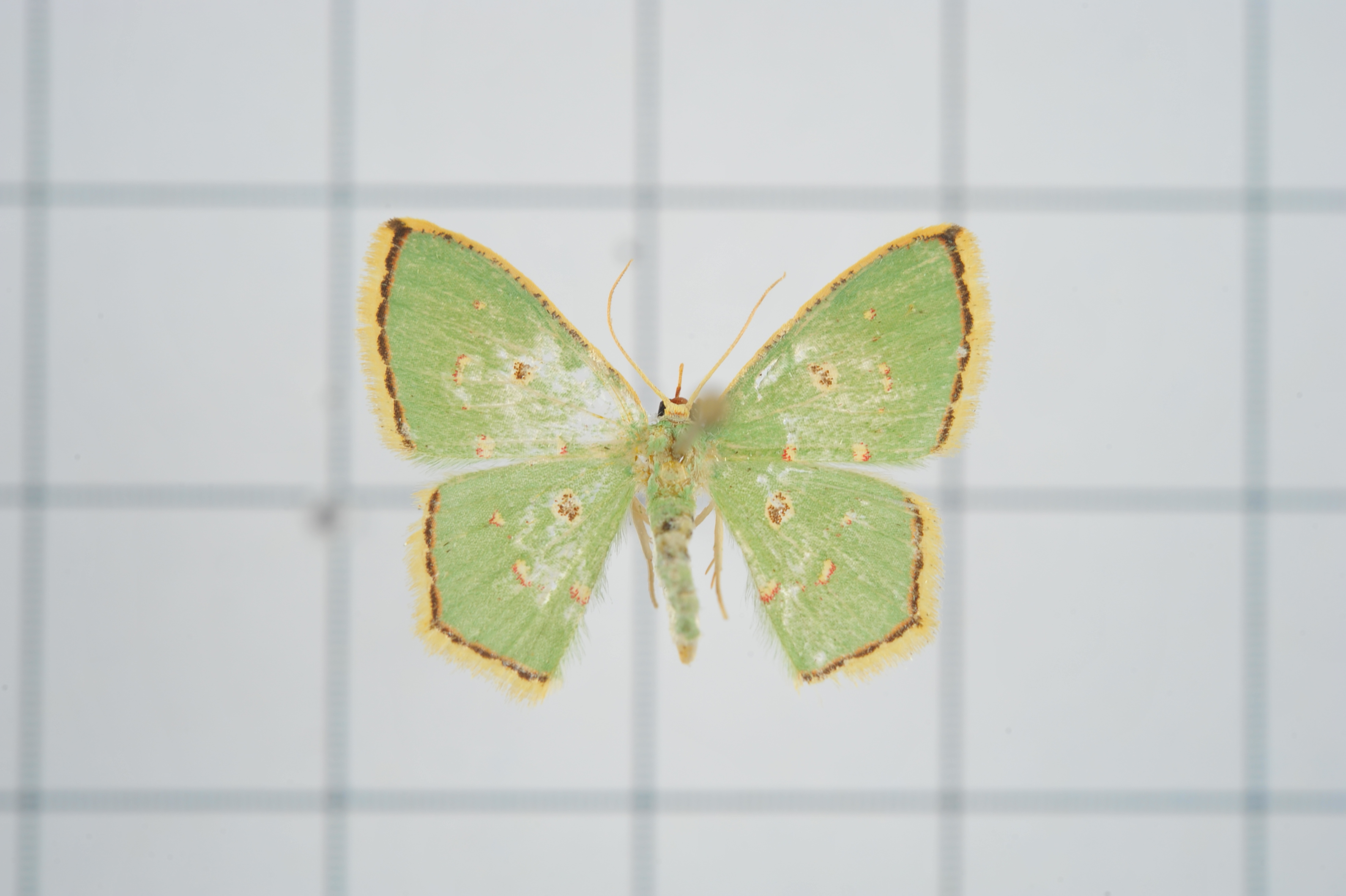
- Comostola subtiliaria demeritaria

Scientific classification
- Kingdom: Animalia
- Phylum: Arthropoda
- Clade: Pancrustacea
- Class: Insecta
- Order: Lepidoptera
- Family: Geometridae
- Genus: Comostola
- Species: C. subtiliaria

Binomial name
- Comostola subtiliaria (Bremer, 1864)

Synonyms
- Euchloris subtiliaria Bremer, 1864; Racheospila nympha Butler, 1881; Comostola demeritaria Prout, 1917; Comostola demeritaria vapida Prout, 1934; Comostola subtiliaria insulata Inoue, kawazoei Inoue, 1963; Comostola meritaria Walker sensu Holloway, 1976

= Comostola subtiliaria =

Species of moth

Comostola subtiliaria is a moth of the family Geometridae first described by Otto Vasilievich Bremer in 1864. It is a widespread species which is found in Korea and adjacent parts of Siberia, Japan, Borneo, Sumatra, India (north-east Himalaya), South China, Taiwan, Borneo, Sumatra, and Sri Lanka.

The moth is generally green with a discal spot in its hindwing which is more regular and square than other species. The caterpillar is known to feed on Malus, Eurya and Viburnum species.

== Subspecies ==
Four subspecies are recognized.

- Comostola subtiliaria demeritaria Prout, 1917 - Taiwan
- Comostola subtiliaria insulata Inoue, 1963 - Japan
- Comostola subtiliaria kawazoei Inoue, 1963
- Comostola subtiliaria nympha Butler, 1881

== Gallery ==
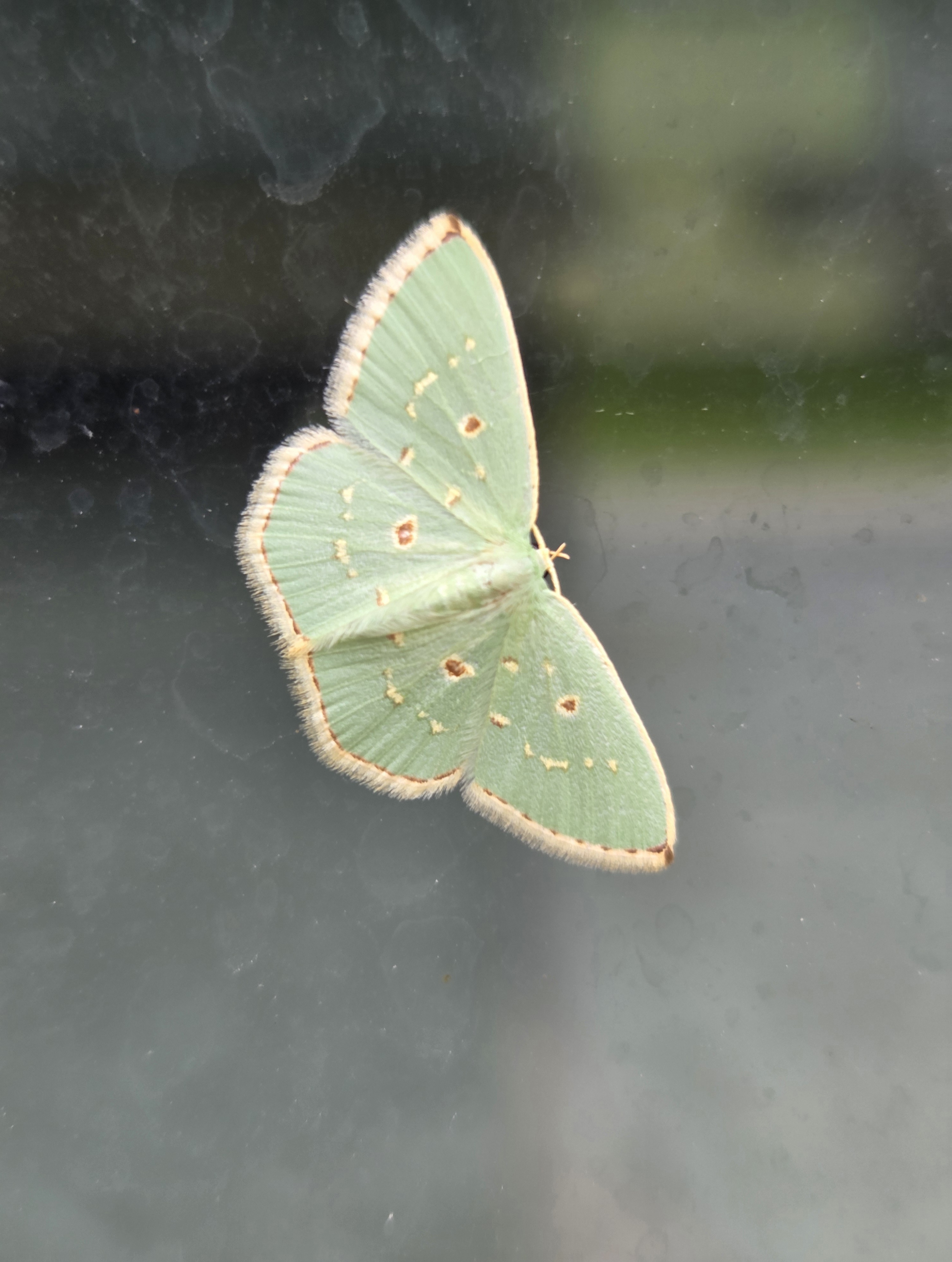
Live

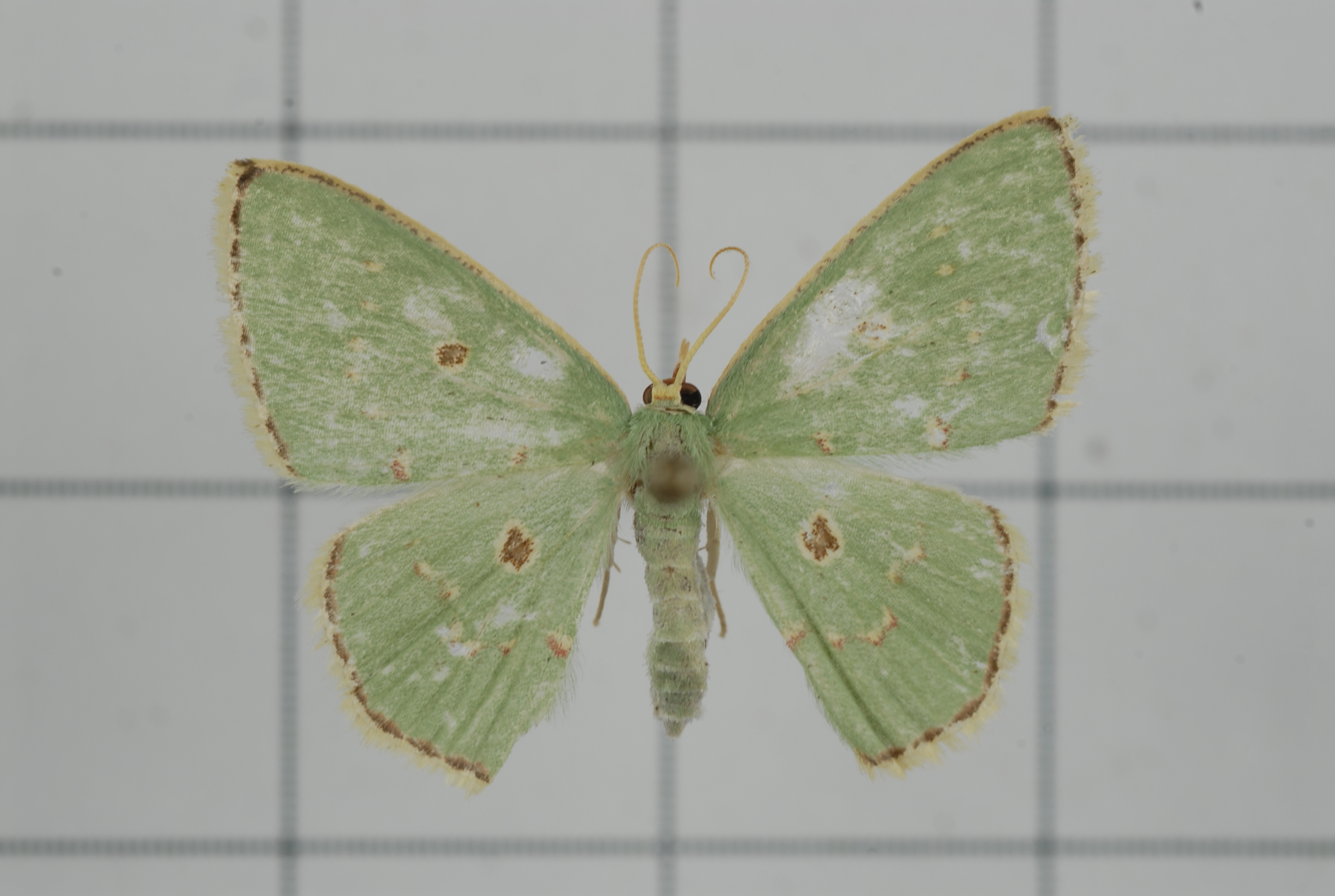
Subspecies demeritaria

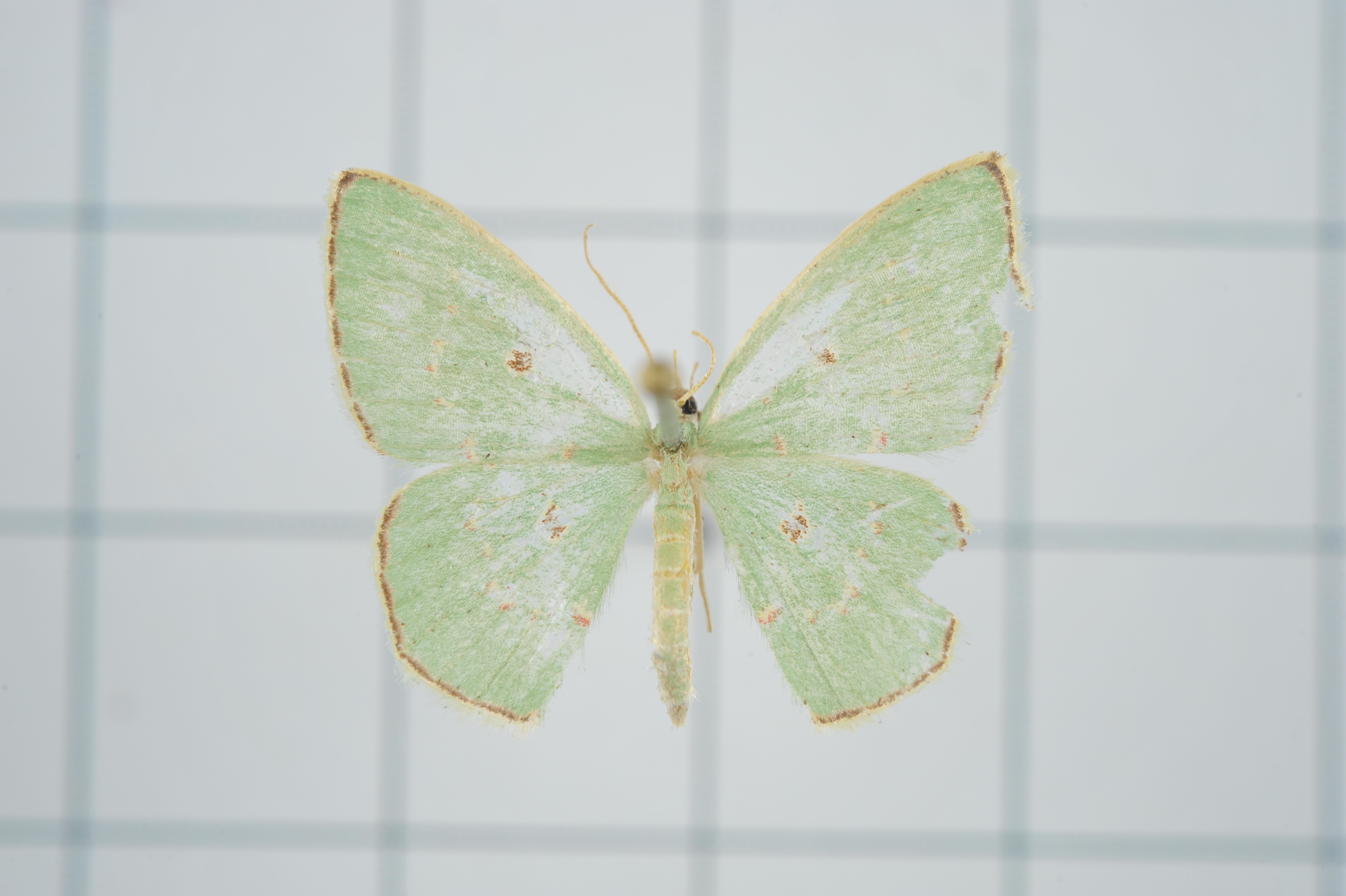
Subspecies demeritaria
