= Pasiphilodes fractiscripta =

Scientific classification
- Kingdom: Animalia
- Phylum: Arthropoda
- Clade: Pancrustacea
- Class: Insecta
- Order: Lepidoptera
- Family: Geometridae
- Genus: Pasiphilodes
- Species: P. fractiscripta

Binomial name
- Pasiphilodes fractiscripta (Prout, 1958)

Synonyms
- Chloroclystis subpalpata fractiscripta Prout, 1958; Pasiphila fractiscripta

Species of moth

Pasiphilodes fractiscripta is a moth in the family Geometridae. It is found on Luzon.
