= Pasiphilodes diaschista =

Scientific classification
- Kingdom: Animalia
- Phylum: Arthropoda
- Clade: Pancrustacea
- Class: Insecta
- Order: Lepidoptera
- Family: Geometridae
- Genus: Pasiphilodes
- Species: P. diaschista

Binomial name
- Pasiphilodes diaschista (Prout, 1958)

Synonyms
- Chloroclystis diaschista Prout, 1958; Pasiphila diaschista

Species of moth

Pasiphilodes diaschista is a moth in the family Geometridae. It is endemic to New Guinea.
