= Statherotis =

Scientific classification
- Domain: Eukaryota
- Kingdom: Animalia
- Phylum: Arthropoda
- Class: Insecta
- Order: Lepidoptera
- Family: Tortricidae
- Tribe: Olethreutini
- Genus: Statherotis; Meyrick, 1909

Genus of tortrix moths

Statherotis is a genus of moths belonging to the subfamily Olethreutinae of the family Tortricidae.

== Species ==
- Statherotis abathodes Diakonoff, 1973
- Statherotis afonini Razowski, 2009
- Statherotis agitata (Meyrick, 1909)
- Statherotis amaeboea (Lower, 1896)
- Statherotis ancosema (Meyrick, 1932)
- Statherotis antisema Diakonoff, 1973
- Statherotis aspidias (Meyrick, 1909)
- Statherotis ateuches Razowski, 2013
- Statherotis atrifracta Diakonoff, 1973
- Statherotis batrachodes (Meyrick, 1911)
- Statherotis catharosema Diakonoff, 1973
- Statherotis catherota Meyrick, 1928
- Statherotis decorata Meyrick, 1909
- Statherotis diakonoffi Kuznetzov, 1988
- Statherotis discana (Felder & Rogenhofer, 1875)
- Statherotis euryphaea (Turner, 1916)
- Statherotis holotricha Diakonoff, 1973
- Statherotis iricolor (Meyrick, 1930)
- Statherotis leucaspis (Meyrick, in Gardiner, 1902)
- Statherotis licnuphora Diakonoff, 1973
- Statherotis micrandra Diakonoff, 1973
- Statherotis olenarcha (Meyrick, 1931)
- Statherotis pendulata (Meyrick, 1911)
- Statherotis perculta Diakonoff, 1973
- Statherotis polychlora Diakonoff, 1973
- Statherotis porphyrochlora Diakonoff, 1973
- Statherotis semaeophora Diakonoff, 1973
- Statherotis solomonensis (Bradley, 1957)
- Statherotis tapinopa Diakonoff, 1973
- Statherotis tetrarcha (Meyrick, 1920)
- Statherotis towadaensis Kawabe, 1978
- Statherotis toxosema (Turner, 1946)
- Statherotis transsecta Diakonoff, 1973

== See also ==
- List of Tortricidae genera
