= Chiromachla torbeni =

Scientific classification
- Kingdom: Animalia
- Phylum: Arthropoda
- Class: Insecta
- Order: Lepidoptera
- Superfamily: Noctuoidea
- Family: Erebidae
- Subfamily: Arctiinae
- Genus: Chiromachla
- Species: C. torbeni

Binomial name
- Chiromachla torbeni (Wiltshire, 1983)

Synonyms
- Nyctemera torbeni Wiltshire, 1983

Species of moth

Chiromachla torbeni is a moth of the family Erebidae. It is found in Saudi Arabia and Yemen.
