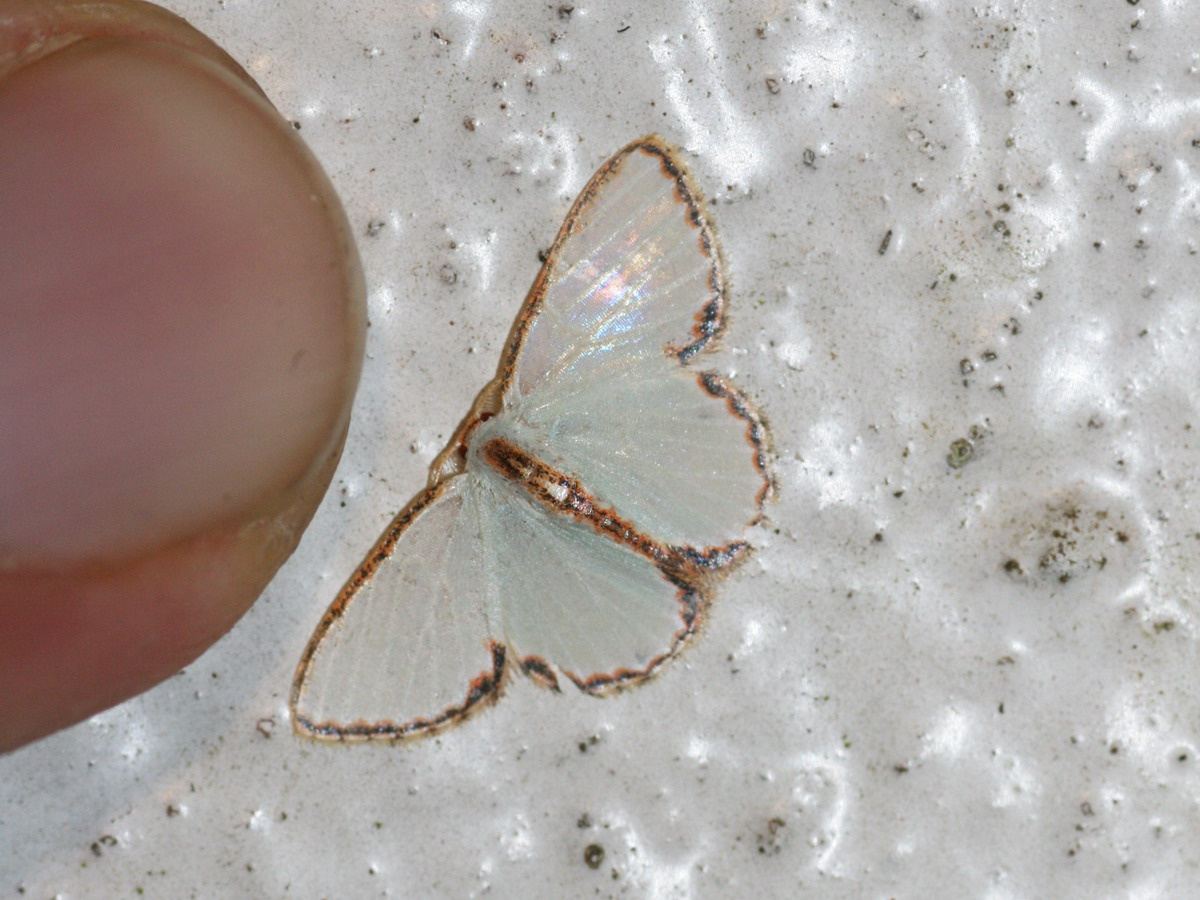

Scientific classification
- Kingdom: Animalia
- Phylum: Arthropoda
- Class: Insecta
- Order: Lepidoptera
- Family: Geometridae
- Genus: Comostola
- Species: C. pyrrhogona

Binomial name
- Comostola pyrrhogona (Walker, 1866)

Synonyms
- Eucrostis pyrrhogona Walker, 1866; Jodis marginata Lucas, 1895; Pyrrhorachis cornuta Warren, 1896; Pyrrhorachis pyrrhogona augustata Prout, 1917; Pyrrhorachis cornuta callicrossa Prout, 1934; Pyrrhorachis cornuta pisochlora Prout, 1934; Pyrrhorachis cornuta woodfordi Prout, 1934; Pyrrhorachis pyrrhogona succornuta Prout, 1937; Pyrrhorachis cornuta exquisitata D. S. Fletcher, 1957; Pyrrhorachis pyrrhogona subcrenulata Holloway, 1977

= Comostola pyrrhogona =

Species of moth

Comostola pyrrhogona is a moth of the family Geometridae described by Francis Walker in 1866. It is found in the Indo-Australian tropics from India, Sri Lanka to Taiwan, and east to Vanuatu, New Caledonia, northern Australia and Norfolk Island.

== Description ==
The wingspan is about 15–18 mm. Hindwings with veins 3 and 4 stalked. Antennae of male bipectinated (comb like on both sides) to two-thirds length. Palpi with second and third joints long and slender. Forewings with straight discocellulars. Veins 3, 4 and 6 to 11 stalked. Female pale bluish. Head rufous. A rufous dorsal stripe found on vertex of thorax and abdomen. Forewings with costa, and both wings with the outer margin are orange reddish, with black scales and spots irrorated (sprinkled) with silver. Ventral side whitish. Male genitalia include a slender spine enfolded in the sacculus.
