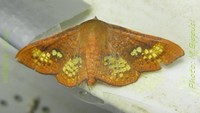
- Banisia clathrula

Scientific classification
- Kingdom: Animalia
- Phylum: Arthropoda
- Class: Insecta
- Order: Lepidoptera
- Family: Thyrididae
- Genus: Banisia; Walker, 1863

Type species
- Banisia fenistrifera Walker, 1863

Synonyms
- Durdara Moore, 1882; Neobanisia Whalley, 1967; Trophoessa Turner, 1911; Vernifilia Schultze, 1907

= Banisia =

Genus of moths

Banisia is a genus of moths of the family Thyrididae.

== Species ==
Some species of this genus are:

- Banisia aldabrana (Fryer, 1912)
- Banisia antiopa (Viette, 1954)
- Banisia apicale (Fryer, 1912)
- Banisia clathrula (Guenée, 1877)
- Banisia fuliginea (Whalley, 1971)
- Banisia furva (Warren, 1905)
- Banisia inoptata (Whalley, 1971)
- Banisia joccatia (Whalley, 1971)
- Banisia myrtaea (Drury, 1773)
- Banisia myrsusalis (Walker, 1859)
- Banisia tibiale (Fryer, 1912)
- Banisia zamia (Whalley, 1971)
