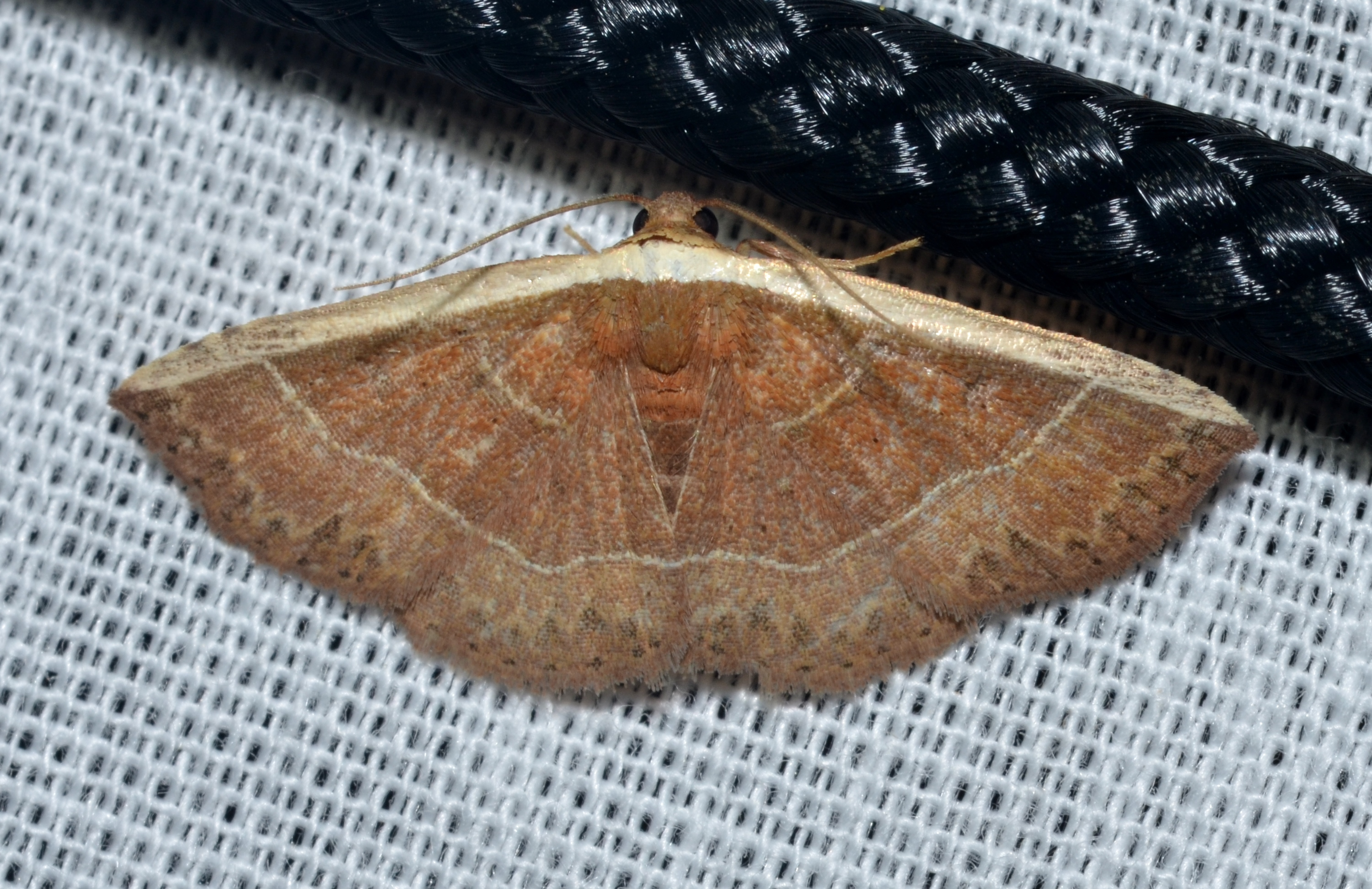

Scientific classification
- Kingdom: Animalia
- Phylum: Arthropoda
- Clade: Pancrustacea
- Class: Insecta
- Order: Lepidoptera
- Superfamily: Noctuoidea
- Family: Erebidae
- Genus: Oruza
- Species: O. albocostaliata

Binomial name
- Oruza albocostaliata (Packard, 1876)

= Oruza albocostaliata =

Species of moth

Oruza albocostaliata, the white edge moth, is a moth in the family Erebidae. The species was first described by Alpheus Spring Packard in 1876. It is found in North America.

The MONA or Hodges number for Oruza albocostaliata is 9025.
