= Chiromachla gracilis =

Scientific classification
- Kingdom: Animalia
- Phylum: Arthropoda
- Clade: Pancrustacea
- Class: Insecta
- Order: Lepidoptera
- Superfamily: Noctuoidea
- Family: Erebidae
- Subfamily: Arctiinae
- Genus: Chiromachla
- Species: C. gracilis

Binomial name
- Chiromachla gracilis (Saalmüller, 1884 )

Synonyms
- Nyctemera gracilis Saalmüller, 1884

Species of moth

Chiromachla gracilis is a moth of the family Erebidae. It is found in Madagascar.
