= Chiromachla leuconoe =

Scientific classification
- Domain: Eukaryota
- Kingdom: Animalia
- Phylum: Arthropoda
- Class: Insecta
- Order: Lepidoptera
- Superfamily: Noctuoidea
- Family: Erebidae
- Subfamily: Arctiinae
- Genus: Chiromachla
- Species: C. leuconoe

Binomial name
- Chiromachla leuconoe (Hopffer, 1857)

Synonyms
- Nyctemera leuconoe Hopffer, 1858; Deilemera leuconoe ab. limbalis Strand, 1909

Species of moth

Chiromachla leuconoe is a moth of the family Erebidae. It is found in the Democratic Republic of Congo, Ethiopia, Kenya, Malawi, Mozambique, South Africa, Sudan, Tanzania, Uganda and Zambia.

== Subspecies ==
- Chiromachla leuconoe leuconoe
- Chiromachla leuconoe limbalis (Strand, 1909) (Tanzania, Uganda)
