= Pasiphilodes luteata =

Scientific classification
- Kingdom: Animalia
- Phylum: Arthropoda
- Clade: Pancrustacea
- Class: Insecta
- Order: Lepidoptera
- Family: Geometridae
- Genus: Pasiphilodes
- Species: P. luteata

Binomial name
- Pasiphilodes luteata (Holloway, 1976)

Synonyms
- Chloroclystis luteata Holloway, 1976; Pasiphila luteata

Species of moth

Pasiphilodes luteata is a moth in the family Geometridae. It is found on Borneo.

The forewings have a pale golden-yellow ground colour with vinous-brown markings.
