= Chiromachla insulare =

Scientific classification
- Kingdom: Animalia
- Phylum: Arthropoda
- Clade: Pancrustacea
- Class: Insecta
- Order: Lepidoptera
- Superfamily: Noctuoidea
- Family: Erebidae
- Subfamily: Arctiinae
- Genus: Chiromachla
- Species: C. insulare

Binomial name
- Chiromachla insulare (Boisduval, 1833)

Synonyms
- Leptosoma insulare Boisduval, 1833; Leptosoma consors Butler, 1879; Nyctemera insularis Mabille, 1879; Nyctemera rasana Mabille, 1879; Deilemera howa Strand, 1909; Deilemera pallescens madagascarica Strand, 1909

Species of moth

Chiromachla insulare is a moth of the family Erebidae. It is found in Comoros, Madagascar, Mauritius, Réunion, and Tanzania.

The larvae feed on Crassocephalum rubens and Senecio acetosaefolius.
