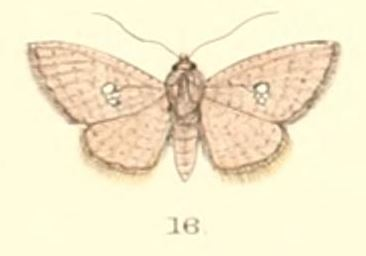

Scientific classification
- Kingdom: Animalia
- Phylum: Arthropoda
- Class: Insecta
- Order: Lepidoptera
- Family: Thyrididae
- Genus: Banisia
- Species: B. myrsusalis

Binomial name
- Banisia myrsusalis (Walker, 1859)

Synonyms
- Pyralis elaralis Walker, 1859; Durdara zonula Swinhoe, 1885; Durdara lobata Moore, 1882; Durdara pyraliata Moore, 1882

= Banisia myrsusalis =

Sapodilla borer

Species of moth

Banisia myrsusalis, the sapodilla borer or sapota midrib folder, is a species of moth of the family Thyrididae. It was described by Francis Walker in 1859 and is found in North America, Brazil, Australia, southern Asia (India, Sri Lanka) and Africa (Madagascar, South Africa).

== Description ==
The wingspan is about 2 cm. Palpi with the third joint of moderate length. Antennae nearly simple in both sexes. Outer margin of both wings nearly evenly curved. Body greyish brown, where some specimens with a slight red or pink tinge. Wings are somewhat lineally striated with dark brown. Forewings with the costa yellow. Cilia fuscous on forewing and white on hindwing. Ventral side is silvery grey where striae are prominent and chestnut brown in colour. Forewings with two brownish postmedial and one sub-apical patch.

== Ecology ==
A host plant of this species is sapodilla (Manilkara zapota), a Sapotaceae. Total life cycle of a male and a female is experimentally proved about 40.8 ± 3.97 and 45.35 ± 4.08 days, respectively.

== Subspecies ==
- Banisia myrsusalis cinereola Felder, Felder & Rogenhofer, 1875
- Banisia myrsusalis elaralis (Walker, 1859)
- Banisia myrsusalis sumatrensis Whalley, 1976

== Host plants ==
- Manilkara zapota
- Mimusops elengi
- Pouteria caimito
- Madhuca latifolia
- Terminalia tomentosa
