= Pasiphilodes hypodela =

Scientific classification
- Kingdom: Animalia
- Phylum: Arthropoda
- Clade: Pancrustacea
- Class: Insecta
- Order: Lepidoptera
- Family: Geometridae
- Genus: Pasiphilodes
- Species: P. hypodela

Binomial name
- Pasiphilodes hypodela (Prout, 1926)

Synonyms
- Chloroclystis hypodela Prout, 1926; Pasiphila hypodela

Species of moth

Pasiphilodes hypodela is a moth in the family Geometridae. It is endemic to New Guinea.
