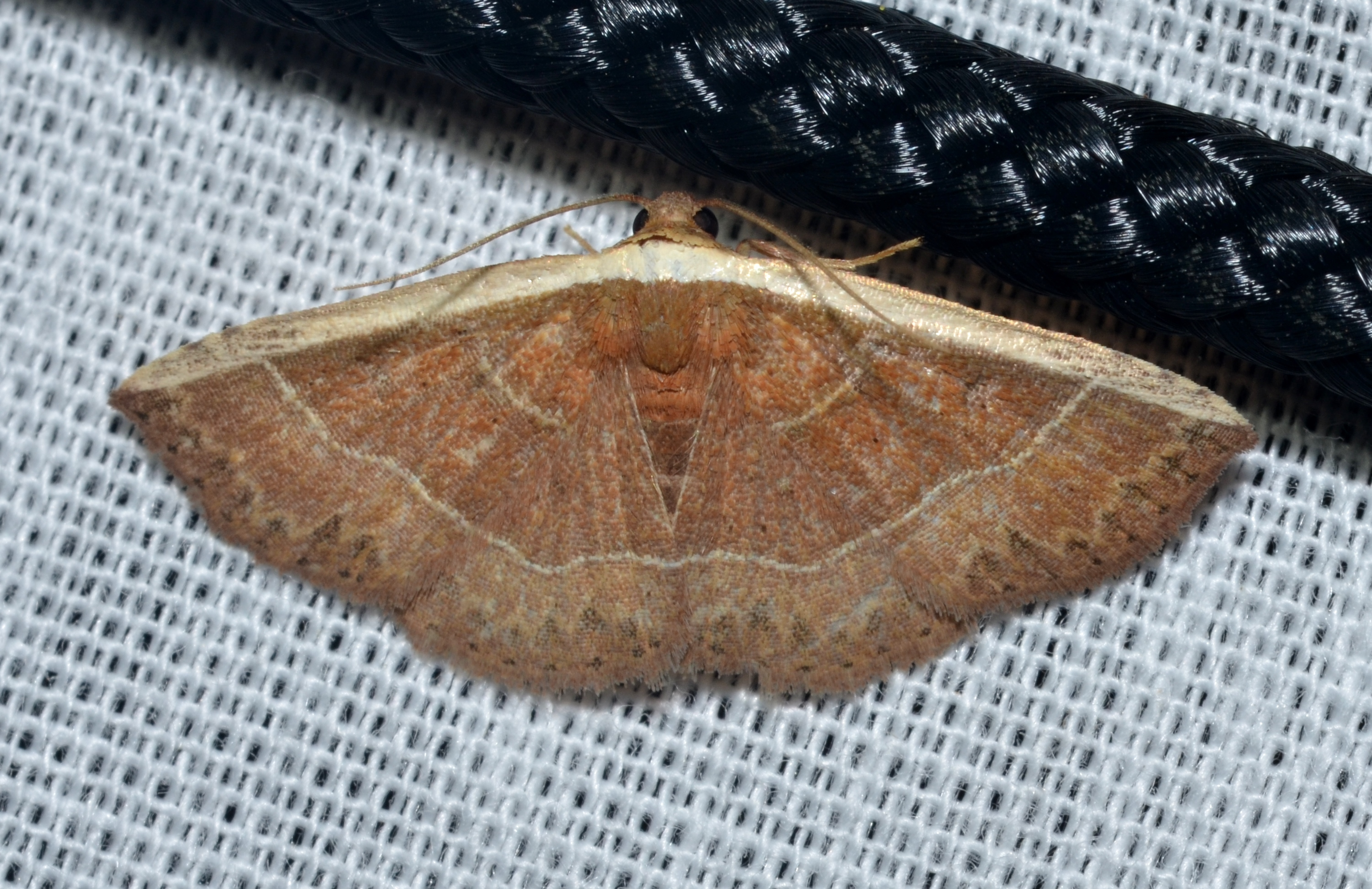
- Oruza albocostaliata

Scientific classification
- Kingdom: Animalia
- Phylum: Arthropoda
- Class: Insecta
- Order: Lepidoptera
- Superfamily: Noctuoidea
- Family: Erebidae
- Subfamily: Boletobiinae
- Genus: Oruza; Walker, 1862

Synonyms
- Curvatula Staudinger, 1892

= Oruza =

Genus of moths

Oruza is a genus of moths of the family Erebidae erected by Francis Walker in 1862.

== Description ==
Palpi upturned, reaching vertex of head, where the second joint hairy in front and third joint minute. Antennae of male ciliated and with bristles at the joints. Thorax and abdomen slightly scaled. Forelegs with hairy tibia and femur. Hindlegs of male with outer side hairy tibia and tarsi, with long short scaly spurs. Hindwings with long hairy tibia and tarsi in both sides and scaly spurs. Forewings rather elongate, with round apex. Vein 8 anastomosing with veins 9 and 10 to form the areole. Hindwings with stalked veins 3 and 4. Larva with two pairs of abdominal prolegs.

== Taxonomy ==
The genus has previously been classified in the subfamily Aventiinae within Erebidae or in the subfamily Acontiinae of the family Noctuidae.

== Species ==
- Oruza albigutta Wileman, 1914
- Oruza albocostaliata Packard, 1876 – white edge moth
- Oruza albocostata Druce, 1899
- Oruza atriapicata Hampson, 1910
- Oruza bipunctata Warren, 1913
- Oruza cariosa Lucas, 1894
- Oruza cervinipennis Warren, 1913
- Oruza chalcogramma Bryk, 1949
- Oruza chionocraspis Hampson, 1918
- Oruza costaloides Poole, 1983
- Oruza costata Walker, 1862
- Oruza crocodeta Turner, 1903
- Oruza dasycara Prout, 1926
- Oruza discisigna Warren, 1913
- Oruza divisa Walker, 1862
- Oruza dolichognatha Hampson, 1918
- Oruza dorsinotata Warren, 1913
- Oruza doto Schaus, 1914
- Oruza glaucotorna Hampson, 1910
- Oruza inclinata Berio, 1963
- Oruza kavatcha Holloway, 1979
- Oruza kuehni Warren, 1913
- Oruza lacteicosta Hampson, 1898
- Oruza latifera Walker, 1869
- Oruza leucocraspia Hampson, 1910
- Oruza leucostigma Turner, 1945
- Oruza lithochroma Turner, 1929
- Oruza maerens Turner, 1936
- Oruza megalospila Turner, 1933
- Oruza microstigma Warren, 1913
- Oruza mira Butler, 1879
- Oruza morma Swinhoe, 1901
- Oruza narabuta Holloway, 1979
- Oruza obliquaria Marumo, 1936
- Oruza particolor Warren, 1913
- Oruza rectangulata Warren, 1913
- Oruza rectilineata Hampson, 1910
- Oruza rufata Warren, 1913
- Oruza rufiplaga Bethune-Baker, 1906
- Oruza rupestre Fryer, 1912
- Oruza semilux Walker, 1865
- Oruza seminivea Warren, 1913
- Oruza sordida Wileman & West, 1929
- Oruza stragulata Pagenstecher, 1900
- Oruza submira Sugi, Sugi, Kuroko, Moriuti & Kawabe, 1982
- Oruza unipuncta Warren, 1913
- Oruza xanthoptera Hampson, 1902
- Oruza yoshinoensis Wileman, 1911
