= Oruza albocostata =

Scientific classification
- Domain: Eukaryota
- Kingdom: Animalia
- Phylum: Arthropoda
- Class: Insecta
- Order: Lepidoptera
- Superfamily: Noctuoidea
- Family: Erebidae
- Subfamily: Boletobiinae
- Genus: Oruza
- Species: O. albocostata

Binomial name
- Oruza albocostata (H. Druce, 1899)

Species of moth

Oruza albocostata is a species of moth in the family Erebidae first described by Herbert Druce in 1899. It is found in North America.

The MONA or Hodges number for Oruza albocostata is 9026.
