= Bifascioides leucomelanella =

Scientific classification
- Domain: Eukaryota
- Kingdom: Animalia
- Phylum: Arthropoda
- Class: Insecta
- Order: Lepidoptera
- Family: Cosmopterigidae
- Genus: Bifascioides
- Species: B. leucomelanella

Binomial name
- Bifascioides leucomelanella (Rebel, 1916)

Synonyms
- Elachista leucomelanella Rebel, 1916; Bifascioides leucomelanellus; Ascalenia leucomelanella; Ascalenia pirastica Meyrick, 1936; Limnoecia heterosticta Meyrick, 1917

Species of moth

Bifascioides leucomelanella is a moth in the family Cosmopterigidae. It is found in Libya, Egypt and on Malta. It has also been recorded from Sudan, Iran, Saudi Arabia and the United Arab Emirates.

The wingspan is 6–7 mm. Adults have been recorded in February and from May to the end of August. There is probably more than one generation per year.
