= Pasiphilodes nina =

Scientific classification
- Domain: Eukaryota
- Kingdom: Animalia
- Phylum: Arthropoda
- Class: Insecta
- Order: Lepidoptera
- Family: Geometridae
- Genus: Pasiphilodes
- Species: P. nina

Binomial name
- Pasiphilodes nina (Robinson, 1975)

Synonyms
- Chloroclystis nina Robinson, 1975; Pasiphila nina

Species of moth

Pasiphilodes nina is a moth in the family Geometridae. It is found on Fiji.
