= Pasiphilodes subpalpata =

Scientific classification
- Kingdom: Animalia
- Phylum: Arthropoda
- Clade: Pancrustacea
- Class: Insecta
- Order: Lepidoptera
- Family: Geometridae
- Genus: Pasiphilodes
- Species: P. subpalpata

Binomial name
- Pasiphilodes subpalpata (Prout, 1958)

Synonyms
- Chloroclystis subpalpata Prout, 1958; Pasiphila subpalpata

Species of moth

Pasiphilodes subpalpata is a moth in the family Geometridae. It is found on Peninsular Malaysia and Borneo.
