= Pasiphilodes eurystalides =

Scientific classification
- Kingdom: Animalia
- Phylum: Arthropoda
- Clade: Pancrustacea
- Class: Insecta
- Order: Lepidoptera
- Family: Geometridae
- Genus: Pasiphilodes
- Species: P. eurystalides

Binomial name
- Pasiphilodes eurystalides (Prout, 1932)

Synonyms
- Chloroclystis eurystalides Prout, 1932; Pasiphila eurystalides

Species of moth

Pasiphilodes eurystalides is a moth in the family Geometridae. It is found on Borneo.
