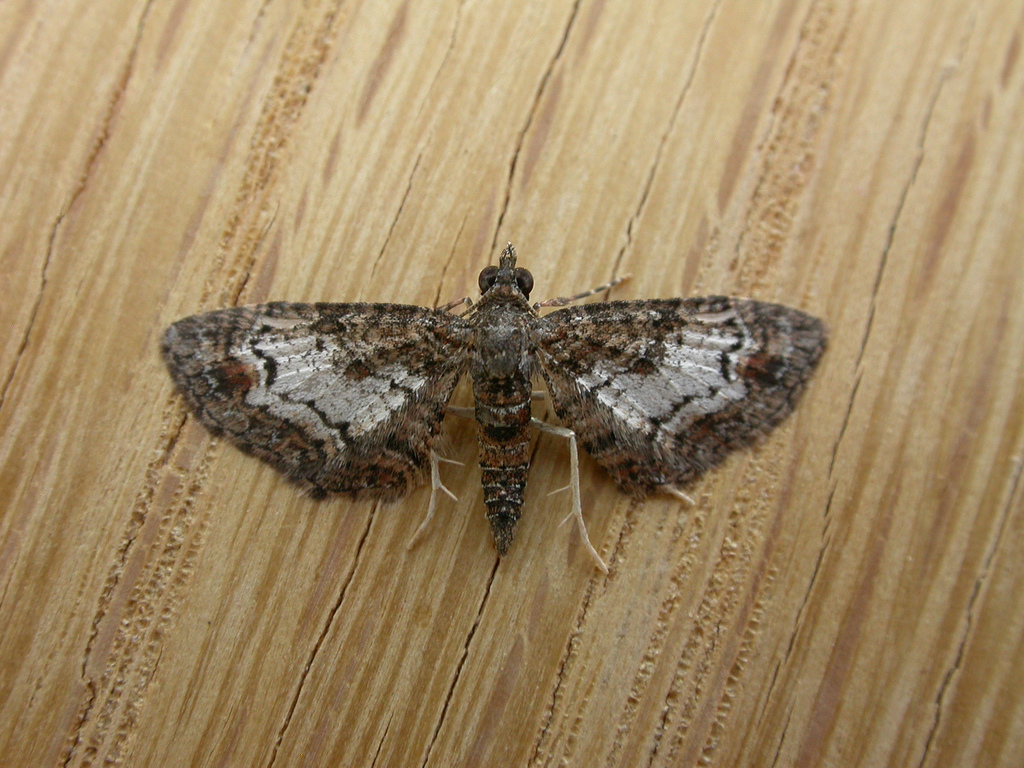

Scientific classification
- Kingdom: Animalia
- Phylum: Arthropoda
- Clade: Pancrustacea
- Class: Insecta
- Order: Lepidoptera
- Family: Geometridae
- Genus: Pasiphilodes
- Species: P. testulata

Binomial name
- Pasiphilodes testulata (Guenée, 1857)

Synonyms
- Eupithecia testulata Guenée, [1858]; Chloroclystis testulata; Scotosia denotata Walker, 1862; Phrissogonus denotatus Meyrick, 1891; Scotosia humerata Walker, 1862; Phibalapteryx parvulata Walker, [1863]; Chloroclystis nobbsi Holloway, 1977; Pasiphila testulata (Guenée, 1857); Phrissogonus testulatus (Guenée, 1857)

= Pasiphilodes testulata =

Species of moth

Pasiphilodes testulata, the pome looper, is a moth of the family Geometridae. The species was first described by Achille Guenée in 1857. It is found in Tasmania and on Norfolk Island, as well as in New Zealand and on the Chatham Islands and Kermadec Islands.

== Subspecies ==
- Pasiphilodes testulata testulata
- Pasiphilodes testulata nobbsi (Holloway, 1977)

== Behaviour ==
Adults of this species are attracted to light and have been collected via a mercury vapour light trap.
