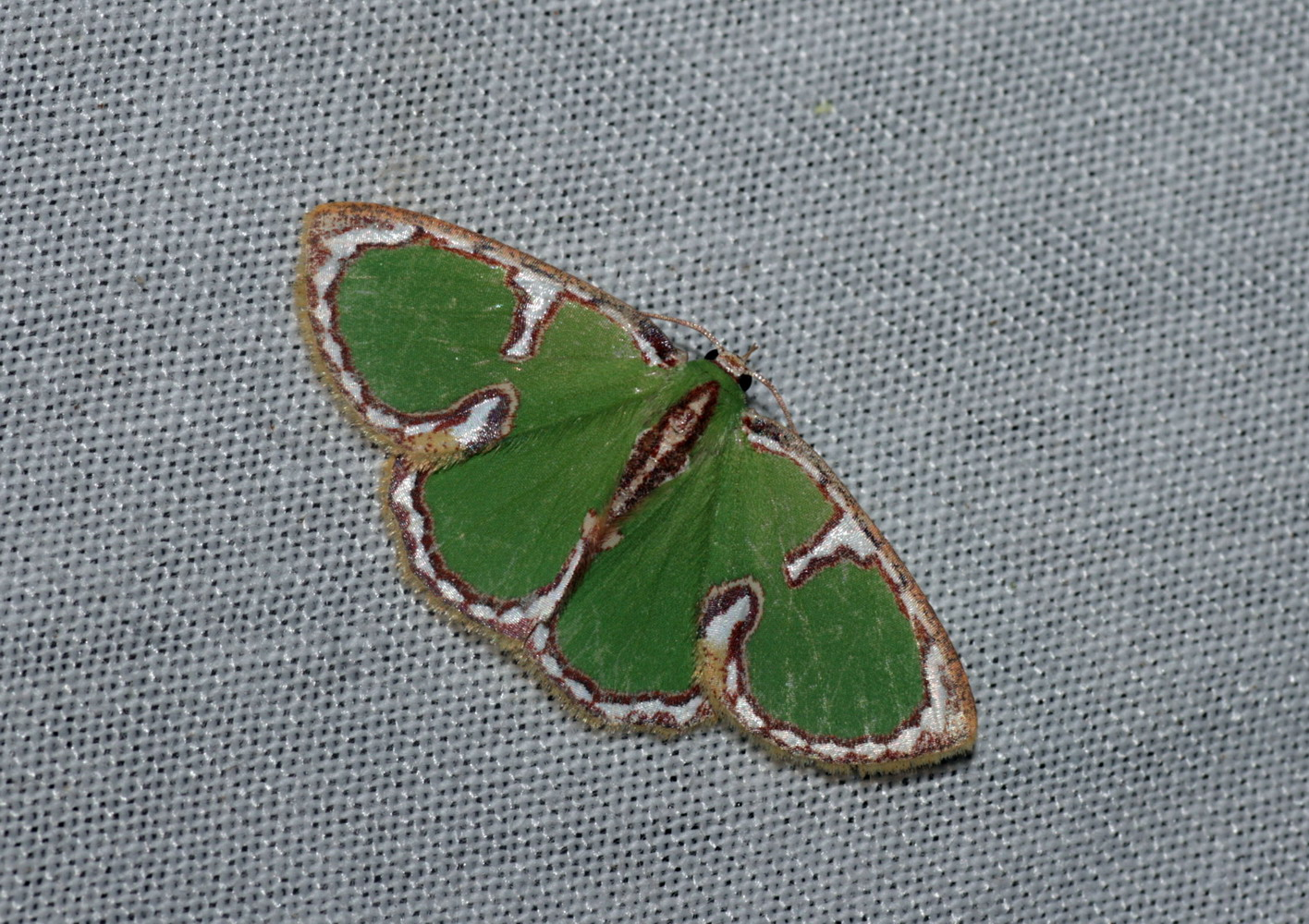

Scientific classification
- Kingdom: Animalia
- Phylum: Arthropoda
- Clade: Pancrustacea
- Class: Insecta
- Order: Lepidoptera
- Family: Geometridae
- Genus: Comostola
- Species: C. cedilla

Binomial name
- Comostola cedilla Prout, 1917

= Comostola cedilla =

Species of moth

Comostola cedilla are a species of moth of the family Geometridae. It is found in New Guinea, Queensland, the southern Moluccas, Sulawesi, the Philippines, Borneo, Sumatra and Peninsular Malaysia.
