= Statherotis ateuches =

Scientific classification
- Kingdom: Animalia
- Phylum: Arthropoda
- Class: Insecta
- Order: Lepidoptera
- Family: Tortricidae
- Genus: Statherotis
- Species: S. ateuches

Binomial name
- Statherotis ateuches Razowski, 2013

Species of moth

Statherotis ateuches is a species of moth of the family Tortricidae. It is found in New Caledonia in the southwest Pacific Ocean.

The wingspan is about 22 mm.
