= Chiromachla restrictum =

Scientific classification
- Domain: Eukaryota
- Kingdom: Animalia
- Phylum: Arthropoda
- Class: Insecta
- Order: Lepidoptera
- Superfamily: Noctuoidea
- Family: Erebidae
- Subfamily: Arctiinae
- Genus: Chiromachla
- Species: C. restrictum

Binomial name
- Chiromachla restrictum (Butler, 1894)

Synonyms
- Leptosoma restrictum Butler, 1894

Species of moth

Chiromachla restrictum is a moth of the family Erebidae. It is found in Democratic Republic of Congo, Ethiopia, Ghana, Kenya, Nigeria, Tanzania and Uganda.
