= Glyphipterix medica =

Scientific classification
- Kingdom: Animalia
- Phylum: Arthropoda
- Clade: Pancrustacea
- Class: Insecta
- Order: Lepidoptera
- Family: Glyphipterigidae
- Genus: Glyphipterix
- Species: G. medica

Binomial name
- Glyphipterix medica Meyrick, 1911

Species of moth

Glyphipterix medica is a moth in the family Glyphipterigidae. It is known from South Africa and the Seychelles.
