= Chiromachla seychellensis =

Scientific classification
- Kingdom: Animalia
- Phylum: Arthropoda
- Class: Insecta
- Order: Lepidoptera
- Superfamily: Noctuoidea
- Family: Erebidae
- Subfamily: Arctiinae
- Genus: Chiromachla
- Species: C. seychellensis

Binomial name
- Chiromachla seychellensis (Hampson, 1908)

Synonyms
- Deilemera seychellensis Hampson, 1908

Species of moth

Chiromachla seychellensis is a moth of the family Erebidae. It is found in the Seychelles.
