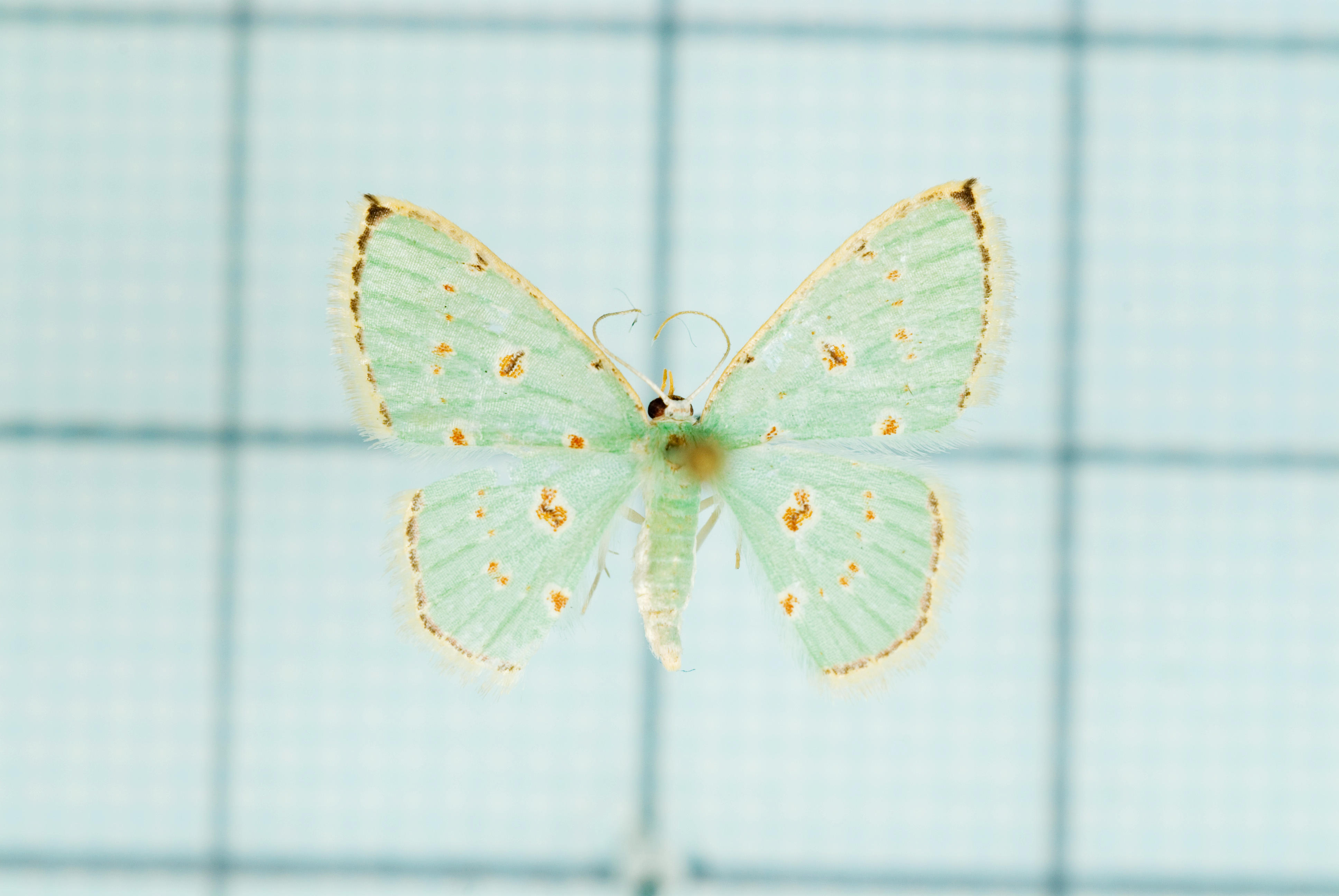
- Mounted specimen
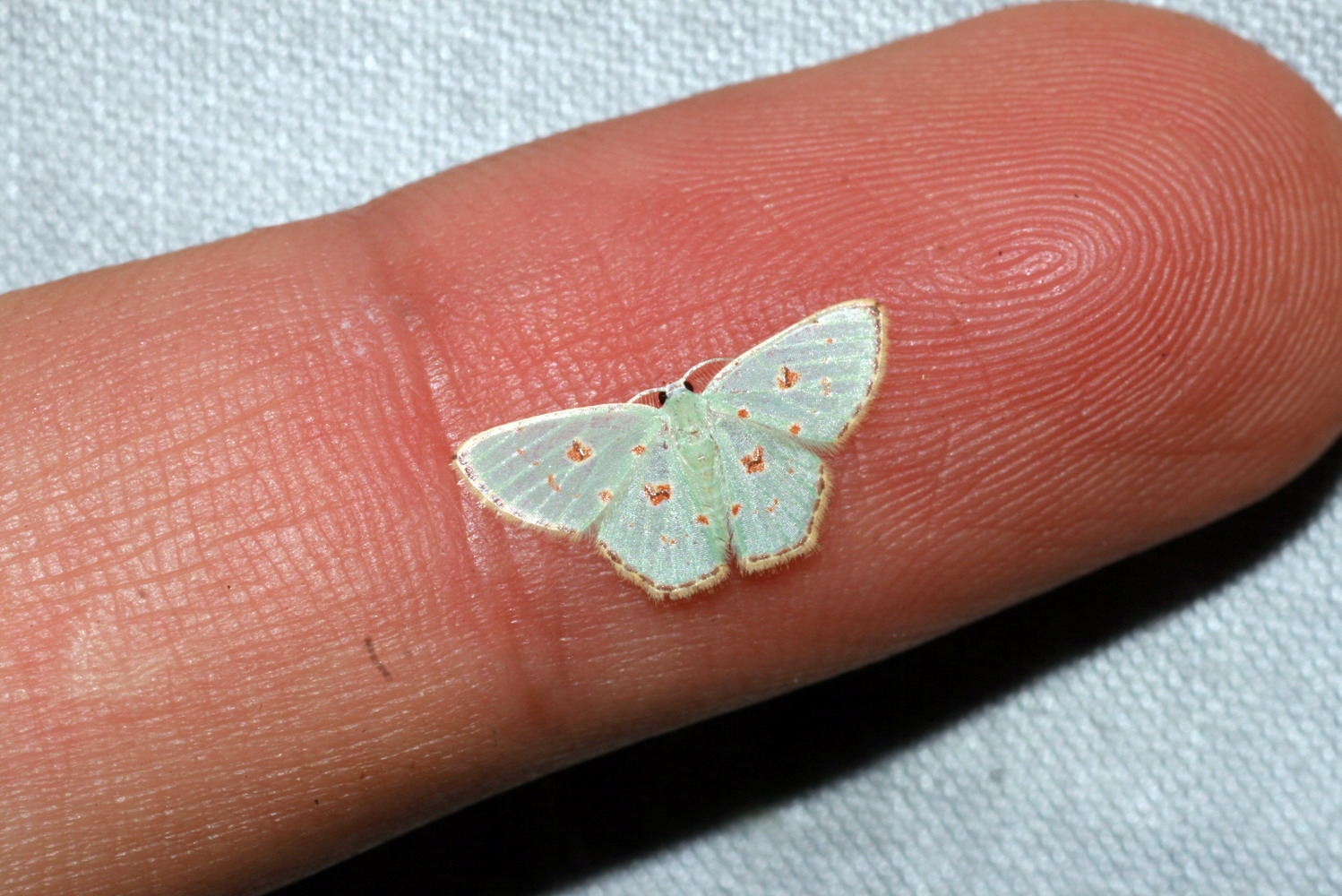
- Living specimen

Scientific classification
- Kingdom: Animalia
- Phylum: Arthropoda
- Class: Insecta
- Order: Lepidoptera
- Family: Geometridae
- Genus: Comostola
- Species: C. laesaria

Binomial name
- Comostola laesaria (Walker, 1861)

Synonyms
- Iodis laesaria Walker, 1861; Eucrostis perlepidaria Walker, 1866

= Comostola laesaria =

Species of moth

Comostola laesaria is a moth of the family Geometridae first described by Francis Walker in 1861. It is found in Sri Lanka, India, Indochina, southern China, Taiwan, Sundaland, northern Australia, Singapore, and the Bismarck Archipelago.

The wingspan is about 20 mm.

Larvae feed on the flowers of various plants, including Buchanania, Mangifera, Terminalia carolinensis, Melastomataceae, Melaleuca and Dimocarpus species. They are pale green or brown.
