= Pasiphilodes subtrita =

Scientific classification
- Kingdom: Animalia
- Phylum: Arthropoda
- Class: Insecta
- Order: Lepidoptera
- Family: Geometridae
- Genus: Pasiphilodes
- Species: P. subtrita

Binomial name
- Pasiphilodes subtrita (Walker, 1866)

Synonyms
- Eupithecia subtrita Walker, 1866; Chloroclystis oceanica Herbulot, 1962; Pasiphilodes oceanica; Chloroclystis aeneta Prout, 1958; Chloroclystis aucta Herbulot, 1963; Chloroclystis fluctuosa Prout, 1934; Pasiphila lepta Meyrick, 1886; Chloroclystis mempta Prout, 1928; Chloroclystis rotumensis Robinson, 1975; Chloroclystis woodjonesi Prout, 1958

Species of moth

Pasiphilodes subtrita is a moth in the family Geometridae. It is found on the Marshall Islands, Woodlark Island, Tahiti, in Tonga and on Fiji, Rotuma, Samoa, Borneo, the Andamans, the Cocos-Keeling Islands, the Seychelles and Aldabra.
