= Banisia aldabrana =

Scientific classification
- Domain: Eukaryota
- Kingdom: Animalia
- Phylum: Arthropoda
- Class: Insecta
- Order: Lepidoptera
- Family: Thyrididae
- Genus: Banisia
- Species: B. aldabrana

Binomial name
- Banisia aldabrana (Fryer, 1912)

Synonyms
- Rhodoneura aldabrana Fryer, 1912

Species of moth

Banisia aldabrana is a species of moth of the family Thyrididae. It is found in the Seychelles on the islands of Aldabra, Menai and Cosmoledo and in South Africa.

The forewings of this species are light fuscous brown, tinged with rufous and uniformly striated with darker brown. The female is wholly suffused with brick red.

Their wingspan is 15 to 18 mm.

== Subspecies ==
- Banisia aldabrana aldabrana (from Seychelles)
- Banisia aldabrana cana Whalley, 1971 (South Africa)
