= Afrocelestis lochaea =

Scientific classification
- Kingdom: Animalia
- Phylum: Arthropoda
- Class: Insecta
- Order: Lepidoptera
- Family: Tineidae
- Genus: Afrocelestis
- Species: A. lochaea

Binomial name
- Afrocelestis lochaea (Meyrick, 1911)

Synonyms
- Scardia lochaea Meyrick, 1911

Species of moth

Afrocelestis lochaea is a moth of the family Tineidae. It was described in 1911 by Edward Meyrick and is found on the Seychelles.
