= Scopula sparsipunctata =

Scientific classification
- Domain: Eukaryota
- Kingdom: Animalia
- Phylum: Arthropoda
- Class: Insecta
- Order: Lepidoptera
- Family: Geometridae
- Genus: Scopula
- Species: S. sparsipunctata

Binomial name
- Scopula sparsipunctata (Mabille, 1900)

Synonyms
- Acidalia sparsipunctata Mabille, 1900

Species of geometer moth in subfamily Sterrhinae

Scopula sparsipunctata is a moth of the family Geometridae. It is found on Madagascar and the Seychelles.

== Subspecies ==
- Scopula sparsipunctata sparsipunctata (Madagascar)
- Scopula sparsipunctata menaiensis Legrand, 1958 (Seychelles: Menai, Cosmoledo and Aldabra)
