= Statherotis leucaspis =

Scientific classification
- Kingdom: Animalia
- Phylum: Arthropoda
- Class: Insecta
- Order: Lepidoptera
- Family: Tortricidae
- Genus: Statherotis
- Species: S. leucaspis

Binomial name
- Statherotis leucaspis (Meyrick, 1902)

Synonyms
- Eucosma leucaspis Meyrick, in Gardiner, 1902; Argyroploce leucaspis Meyrick, 1909; Olethreutes leucaspis Clarke, 1958; Statherotis leucaspis Diakonoff, 1973

Species of moth

Statherotis leucaspis is a moth of the family Tortricidae first described by Edward Meyrick in 1902. It is found in Thailand, the Maldives, Java, the Marshall Islands, the Ellice Islands, India, Sri Lanka and the Seychelles.

The wingspan is 13.5–14 mm (0.53–0.55 in) for males and 12–15 mm (0.47–0.59 in) for females.
