= Scopula aspiciens =

Scientific classification
- Kingdom: Animalia
- Phylum: Arthropoda
- Clade: Pancrustacea
- Class: Insecta
- Order: Lepidoptera
- Family: Geometridae
- Genus: Scopula
- Species: S. aspiciens

Binomial name
- Scopula aspiciens Prout, 1926

Species of geometer moth in subfamily Sterrhinae

Scopula aspiciens is a moth of the family Geometridae. It was described by Prout in 1926. It is endemic to Madagascar.
