= Scopula legrandi =

Scientific classification
- Kingdom: Animalia
- Phylum: Arthropoda
- Class: Insecta
- Order: Lepidoptera
- Family: Geometridae
- Genus: Scopula
- Species: S. legrandi

Binomial name
- Scopula legrandi Herbulot, 1962

Species of geometer moth in subfamily Sterrhinae

Scopula legrandi is a moth of the family Geometridae. It was described by Claude Herbulot in 1962. It is found on the Seychelles.

The species was originally described from specimens collected on the island of Mahé in the Seychelles, with its holotype and paratypes deposited in major natural history collections. According to the Afromoths online database of Afrotropical moths, Scopula legrandi has confirmed records from multiple locations within the Seychelles archipelago.
