= Bifascioides sindonia =

Scientific classification
- Kingdom: Animalia
- Phylum: Arthropoda
- Class: Insecta
- Order: Lepidoptera
- Family: Cosmopterigidae
- Genus: Bifascioides
- Species: B. sindonia

Binomial name
- Bifascioides sindonia (Meyrick, 1911)

Synonyms
- Cholotis sindonia Meyrick, 1911

Species of moth

Bifascioides sindonia is a moth in the family Cosmopterigidae. It is found on Aldabra in the Seychelles.

This species has a wingspan of 7–8 mm. The forewings are dark purplish-fuscous with a rather broad ochreous-white fascia near the base.
