= Stigmella tropicatella =

Scientific classification
- Kingdom: Animalia
- Phylum: Arthropoda
- Class: Insecta
- Order: Lepidoptera
- Family: Nepticulidae
- Genus: Stigmella
- Species: S. tropicatella

Binomial name
- Stigmella tropicatella Legrand, 1965

Species of moth

Stigmella tropicatella is a moth of the family Nepticulidae. It was described by Henry Legrand in 1965. It is known from the Seychelles.
