= Acrocercops angelica =

Scientific classification
- Domain: Eukaryota
- Kingdom: Animalia
- Phylum: Arthropoda
- Class: Insecta
- Order: Lepidoptera
- Family: Gracillariidae
- Genus: Acrocercops
- Species: A. angelica

Binomial name
- Acrocercops angelica Meyrick, 1919

Species of moth

Acrocercops angelica is a moth of the family Gracillariidae. It is known from the Seychelles.

The larvae feed on Calophyllum inophyllum, Hibiscus abelmoschus and Krukoviella obovata. They probably mine the leaves of their host plant.
