= Banisia apicale =

Scientific classification
- Domain: Eukaryota
- Kingdom: Animalia
- Phylum: Arthropoda
- Class: Insecta
- Order: Lepidoptera
- Family: Thyrididae
- Genus: Banisia
- Species: B. apicale

Binomial name
- Banisia apicale (Fryer, 1912)

Synonyms
- Rhodoneura apicale Fryer, 1912

Species of moth

Banisia apicale is a species of moth of the family Thyrididae. It is found in the Seychelles on Silhouette Island.

Their wingspan is 26 millimetres (1.0 in).
