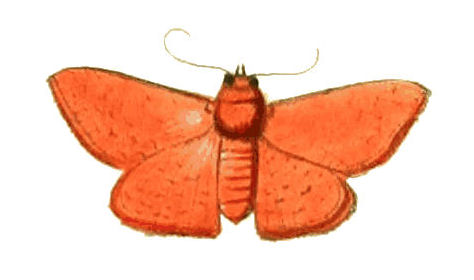

Scientific classification
- Domain: Eukaryota
- Kingdom: Animalia
- Phylum: Arthropoda
- Class: Insecta
- Order: Lepidoptera
- Family: Thyrididae
- Genus: Banisia
- Species: B. myrtaea

Binomial name
- Banisia myrtaea (Drury, 1773)

Synonyms
- Phalaena myrtaea Drury, 1773

= Banisia myrtaea =

Species of moth

Banisia myrtaea is a species of moth of the family Thyrididae. It was first described by Dru Drury in 1773 from Madras.

== Description ==
Upper side: antennæ brown and setaceous. Palpi, head, neck, thorax, abdomen, and wings reddish flesh-coloured; the latter having some very faint waved lines crossing them. Cilia dark brown. Under side: breast, sides, legs, and abdomen coloured as on the upper side. Wings yellowish, with many small narrow streaks. On the external edges of the anterior wings is a dark brown patch, near the tips. Cilia dark brown. Wing-span 1¼ inches (32 mm).
