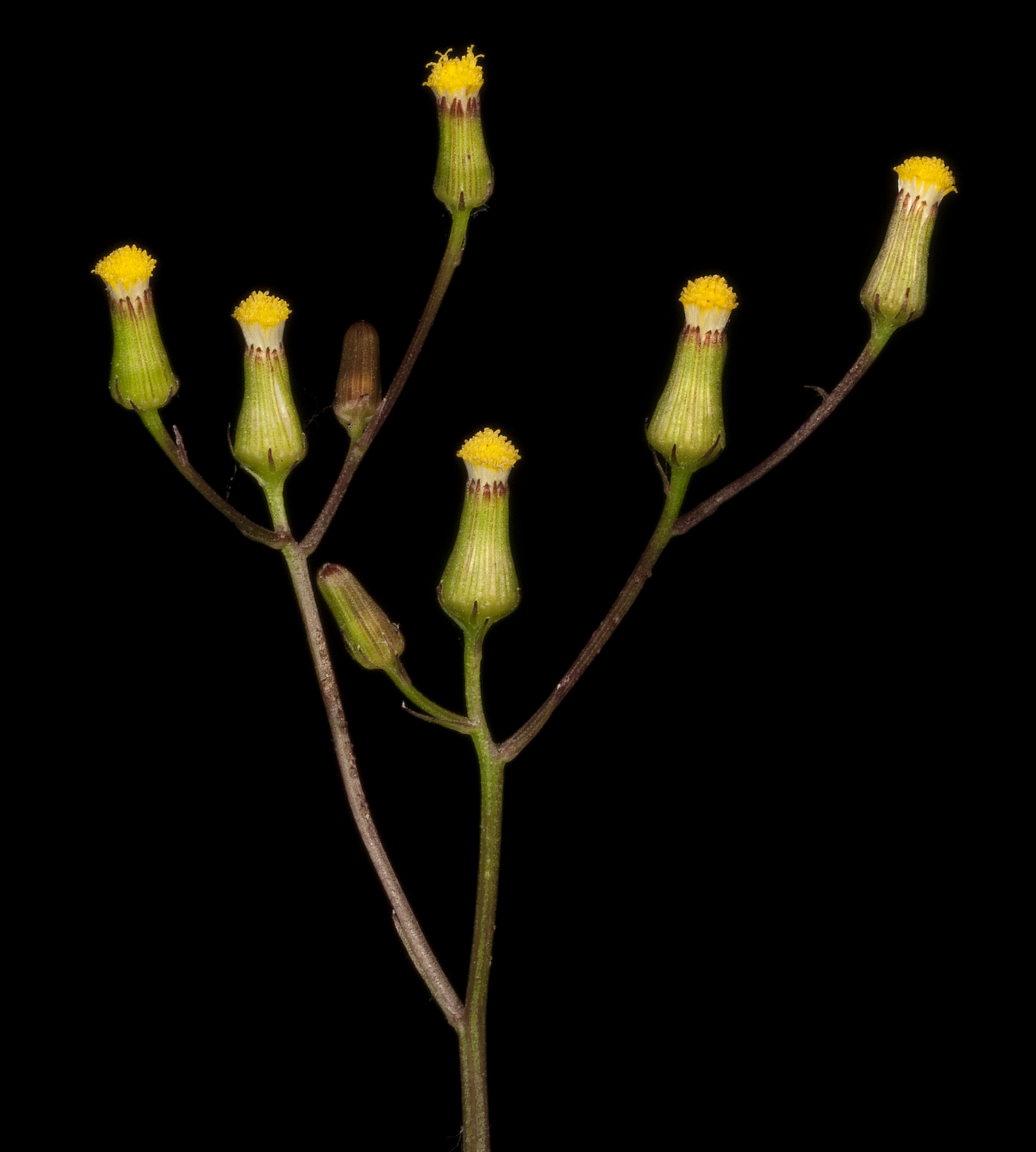

Scientific classification
- Kingdom: Plantae
- Clade: Tracheophytes
- Clade: Angiosperms
- Clade: Eudicots
- Clade: Asterids
- Order: Asterales
- Family: Asteraceae
- Genus: Senecio
- Species: S. quadridentatus

Binomial name
- Senecio quadridentatus Labill. (1806)

= Senecio quadridentatus =

Species of flowering plant

Senecio quadridentatus is a plant in the family Asteraceae native to Australia and New Zealand. In New Zealand it is known by its Māori name pahokoraka or pekapeka. It is also known by the synonym Erechtites quadridentata.

== Description ==
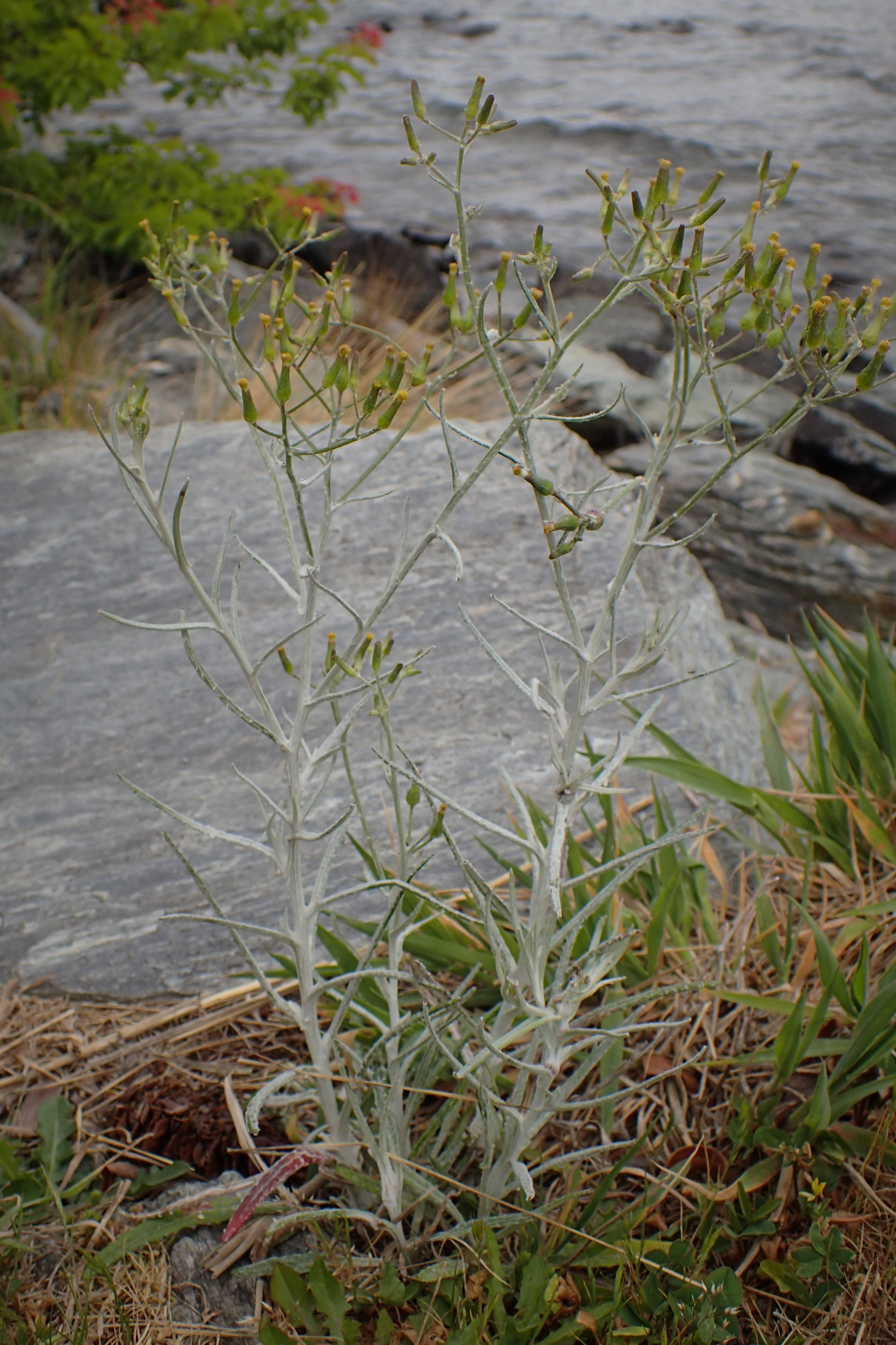
Cotton fireweed plant

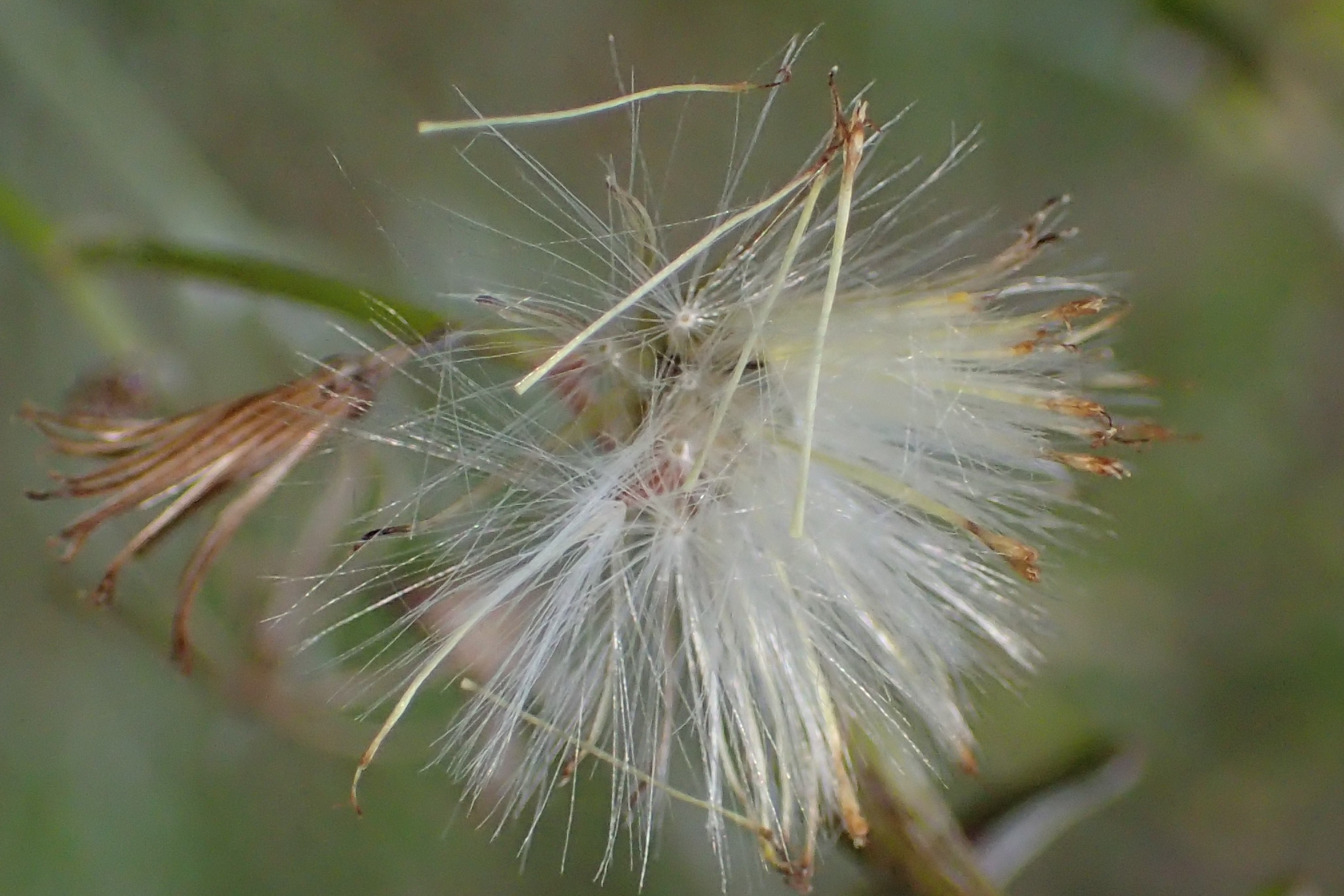

This erect plant, Senecio quadridentatus, is an annual or short-lived perennial herb up to around 1m tall.

Generally speaking, it is a silver-looking plant from a distance which is attractive.

Its stems are branched from or near the hard woody base, covered with thick white fine hair-like filaments, becoming thin with age.

Lower and middle stem leaves are basically evenly arranged and similar in size, about 4–12 cm long and 1.5-6 mm wide. These leaves are linear to narrow lance-shaped with pointed apex and subsessile, the upper surface grey-green with white tomentum or glabrous and the lower surface with moderate to dense white tomentum. Leaves margin is mostly entire or sometimes distantly toothed and revolute almost to midrib. Upper leaves are entire but smaller, maybe a little bit amplexicaul. Basal leaves may be relatively flattened and wider.

The inflorescence is a loose umbellate panicle at the end of the branches. At the base of the flowerhead, there are 3-5 supplementary bracts which are 1-1.5 mm in length, and 12-13 involucral bracts that are 6–9 mm. Involucral bracts are narrow linear-lanceolate toward the incisive end and dry membranous without hair or with minute hairs around margins. The flower base (involucral bracts) is slender and narrow cylindrical. Its flowerhead, composed of around 30 disc florets with no ray florets, is yellow and about 2 mm in diameter. Some of the florets are female that are thread-like with 3-4 toothed around 6 mm long. Others of the florets are bisexual and tubular with 4-5 teeth and become slightly thickened at apexes.

The fruit of Senecio quadridentatus, called achenes, is a dry single-seeded non-opening fruit with the seed distinct from the fruit wall, like all the other plants in the composite family. The achenes of S. quadridentatus are narrow columnar, slightly arcuate, becoming narrowed suddenly near the apices. The achenes have narrow grooves with sparse hairs between flattened ribs, around 3 mm long. The pappus is white feathery bristles, 5–6 mm long.

Cotton firewood is an invasive weed that is unpalatable and poisonous to stocks.

== Distribution ==
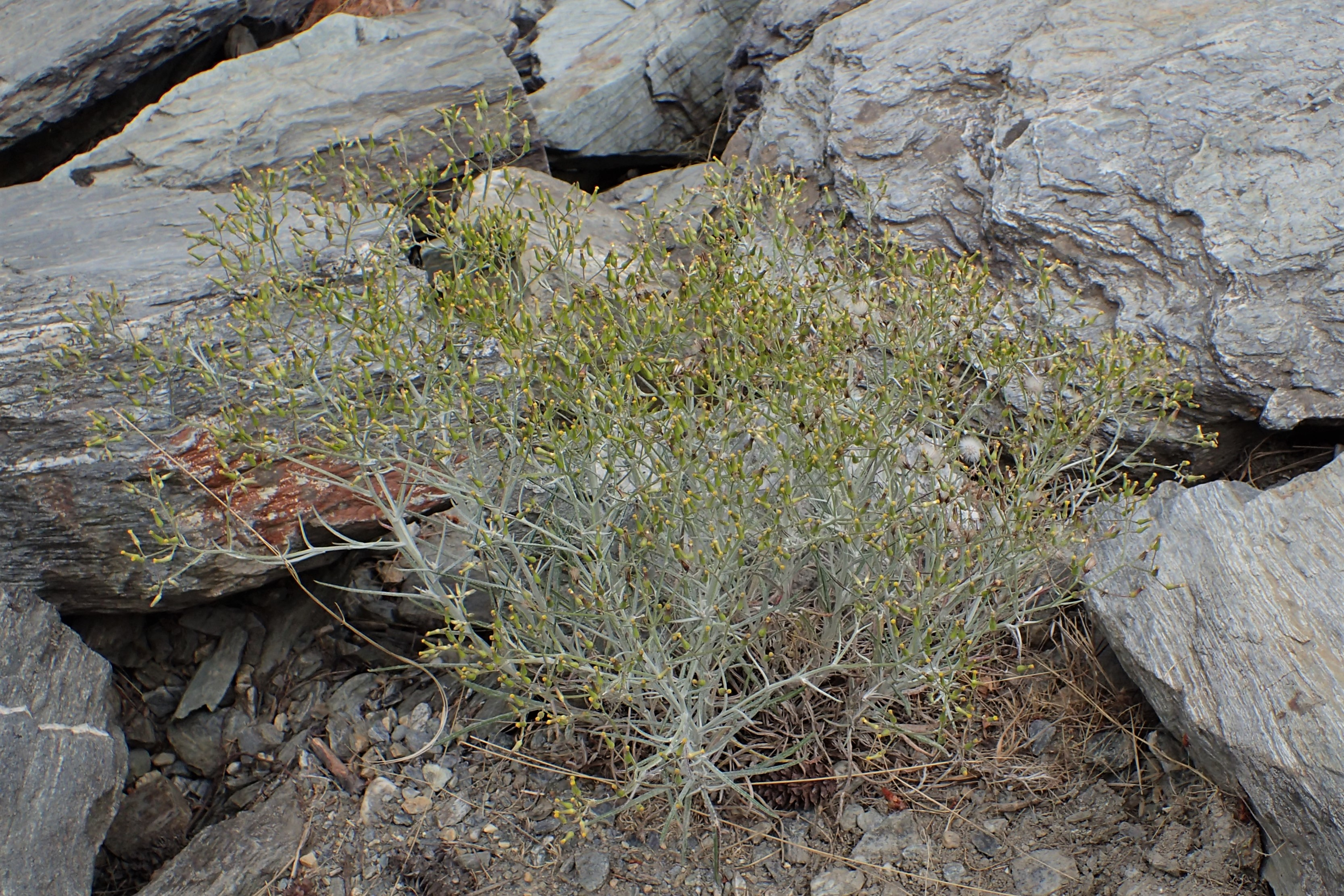

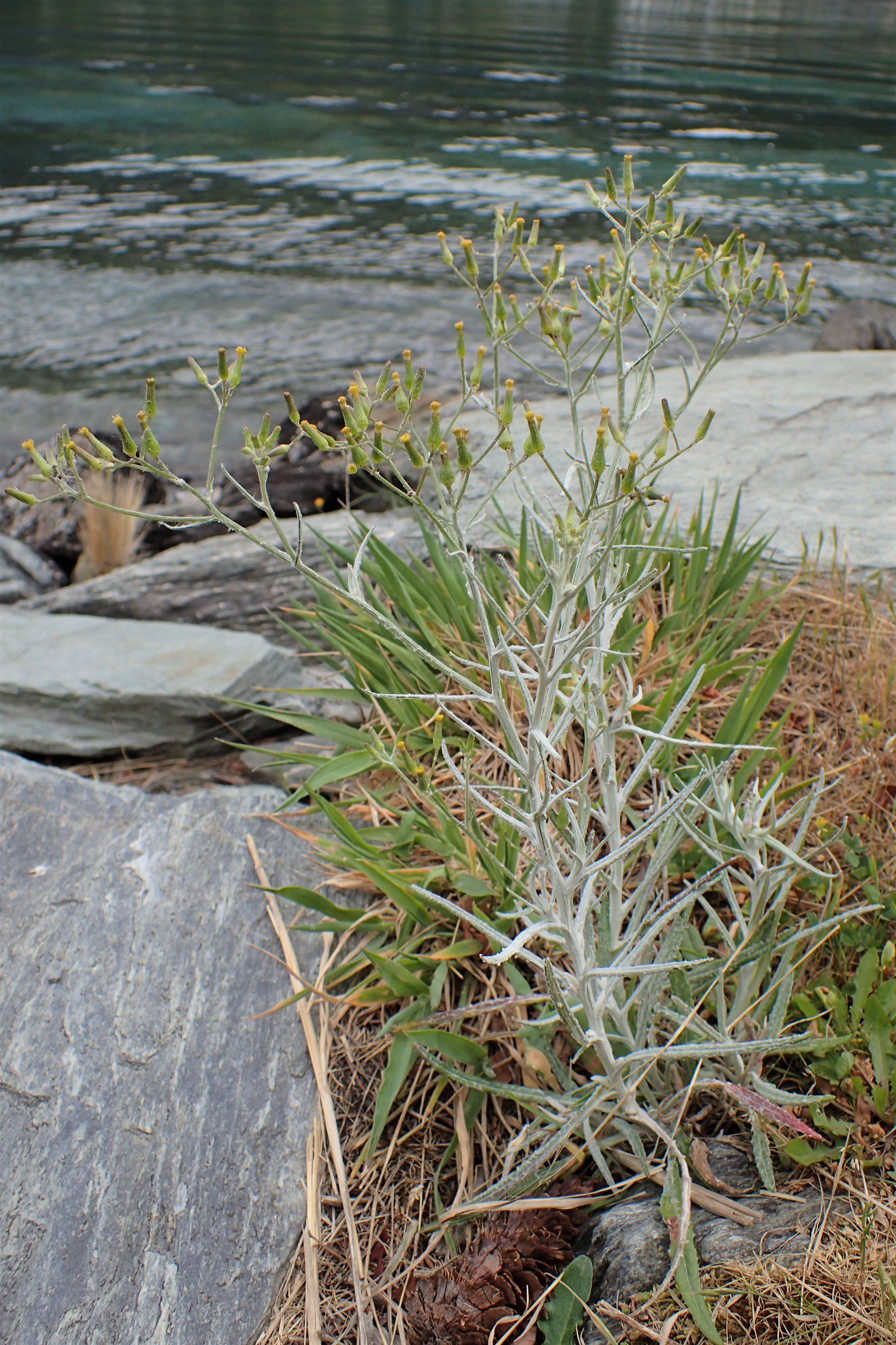

Cotton fireweed (Senecio quadridentatus) is native to New Zealand and it exists in the mainland of New Zealand (South Island & North Island), as well as offshore islands, including Three Kings, Stewart Island and Chatham Island. It also presents in Australia, Tasmania, Timor and Indonesia.

Cotton fireweed mainly distributes in rough and rocky places, such as riverbeds, rock outcrops, cliffs and waste places, and can be seen in shrubland and grassland sporadically. It prefers to grow in open places from lowland to mountain at an altitude of 1000 m above sea level. It cannot grow in places with a thick canopy which differs from other fireweeds because it needs adequate light. It can always present in the areas where disturbance events happened recently.

Cotton fireweed may emerge quickly in new pastures and then disappear after several years. On fertilised land with superphosphate, lime or gypsum, it often increases.

It reported that Senecio quadridentatus found in an urban area in Christchurch in New Zealand may be caused by the distribution of seeds by the wind from Port Hill not far away.

== Life cycle ==
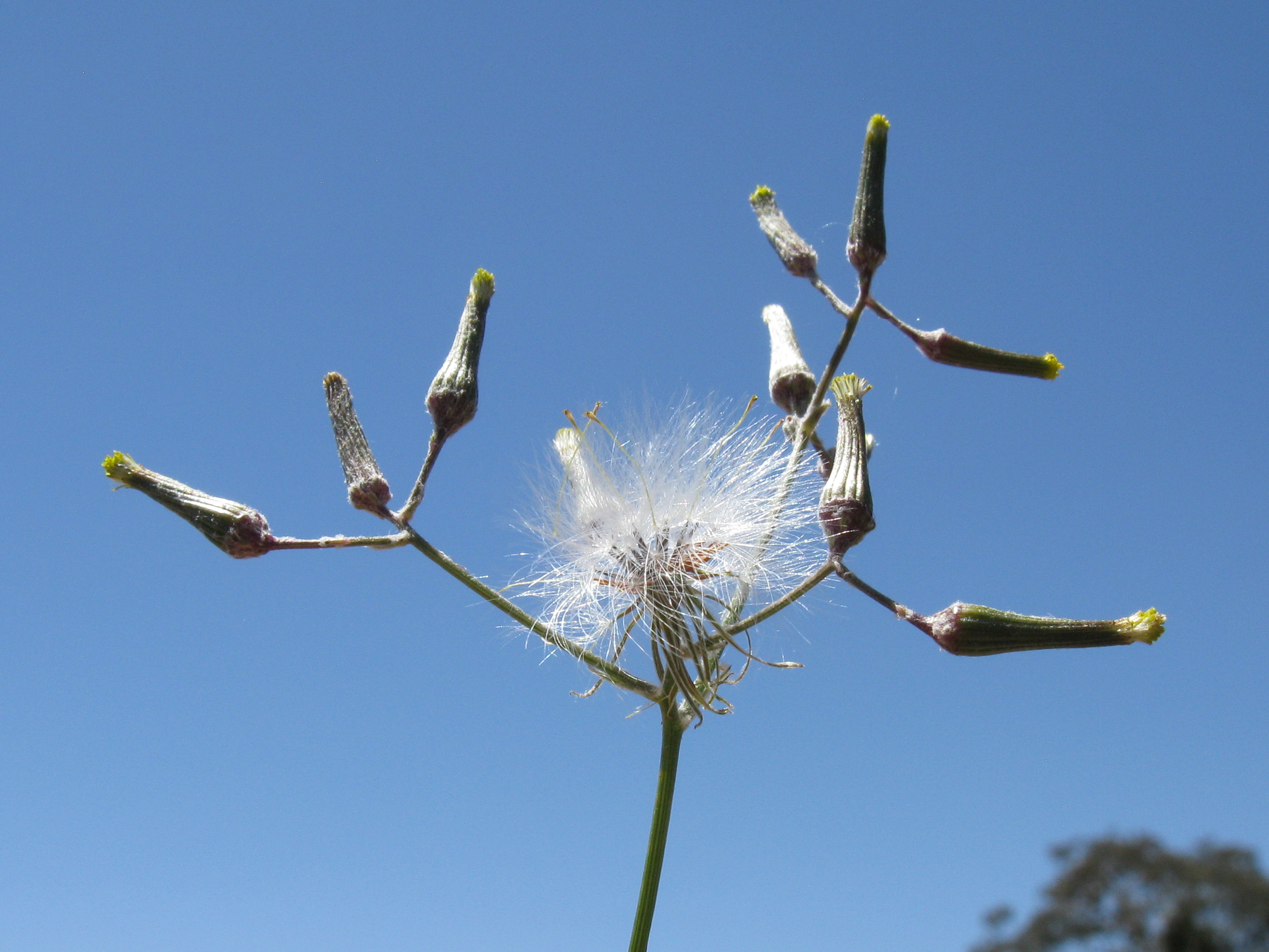

Senecio quadridentatus is a short-lived plant, annual or perennial. It is mainly a short-lived perennial and it can reshoot after disturbances events happened or it can grow as an annual where conditions are tougher.

The flower period is from October to March.

The fruiting period is from December to May.

the flowering and fruiting period of Senecio quadridentatus varies greatly in different regions.

Its seeds disperse by wind because its single-seeded fruit contains pappus, the function of which facilitates the dispersal of seeds. Its seeds can lie dormant on the ground for a couple of years, germinating quickly after summer heat, fire or other disturbances.

== Interactions ==
Chromatomyia syngenesiae (ragwort leafminer), an adventive fly from Europe, is a leaf miner in Compositae (daisy family), including S. quadridentatus. Its larvae mines in leaves of plants in the family Asteraceae and other plants. It develops into a pupa in leaves.

Nyctemera annulata (magpie moth) mainly feeds on the leaves of plants from Senecioinae of the Asteraceae. S. quadridentatus is a host plant of magpie moth larvae (Nyctemera annulata) seen along the Summit Road on the Port Hills in Christchurch.

== Etymology ==
Senecio, the scientific Latin genus name derived from Latin senex, means old man. It may arise from the hoary pappus of the plants in this genus.

Cotton comes from the white cottony appearance of the plants and fireweed results from the abundance of the species on the places where forests burned or other disturbance events happened.

== Similar species ==
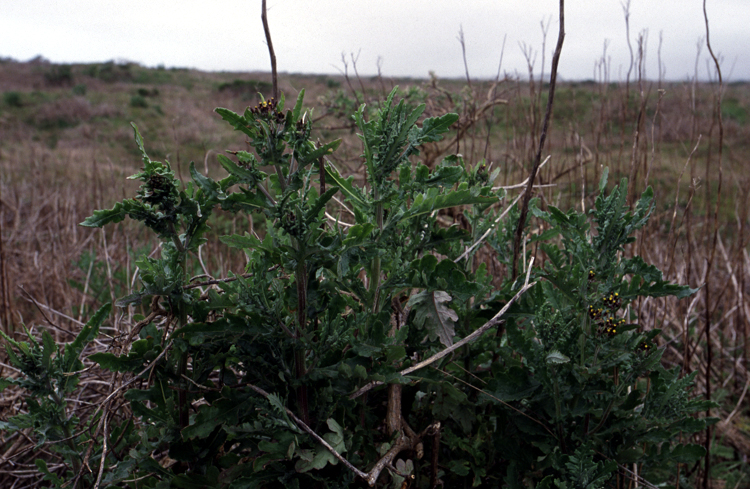
Senecio glomerata

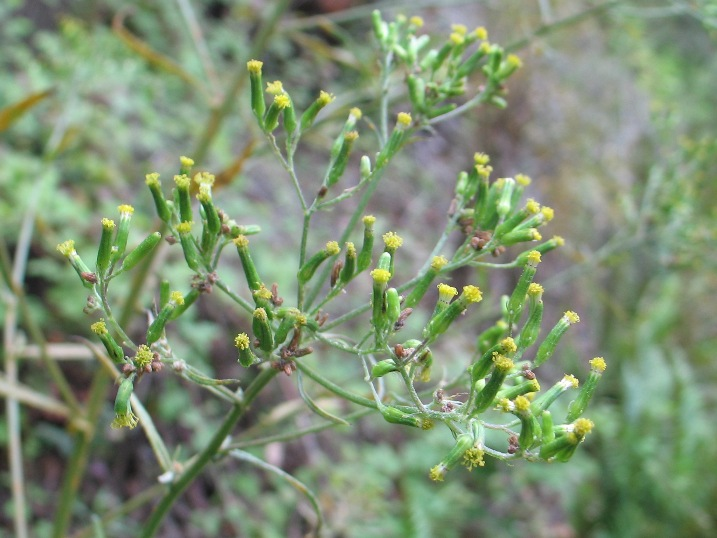
Senecio minimus

In waste places, several native fireweeds are also common, such as Senecio glomeratus (cutleaf burnweed), Senecio minimus (toothed fireweed / coastal burnweed) and Senecio bipinnatisectus (Australia fireweed).

Senecio quadridentatus is easily identified by its leaves and the long phyllaries. Its leaves are narrow and clothed with white fine hairs. The remarkable features that distinguish it from others are the cottony lower surface and entire or distantly toothed margin.

The leaves of Senecio gomeratus are pinnately lobate, with few serrate on each lobe and with white woolly hairs on both leaf surfaces.

Senecio minimus has dentate, lanceolate leaves without hairs on them.

Senecio bipinnatisectus has deeply pinnate leaves.

Senecio dunedinensis Belcher is another species that is easy to confuse with Senecio quadridentatus. Generally, it is smaller than S. quadridentatus. Its involucral bracts (4–6 mm long) are just longer than half of S. quadridentatus (6-10 mm long). However, its leaves are much wider than those of S. quadridentatus. Also, its leaves are dark green to purple-green. S. dunedinensis usually grows in higher areas than S. quadridentatus. However, in geographic areas where you can occasionally see two species, you will also see some of their variations due to hybridization.

== Further information ==
It is rare to find the descriptions of the life habits and lifecycle of cotton fireweed in New Zealand in detail. Instead, there are more materials about cotton fireweed in Australia.
