= Magpie (disambiguation) =

Magpie is a common name describing several genera of the bird family Corvidae.

Magpie or magpies may also refer to:

== Animals ==
=== Butterflies and moths ===
- Magpie (butterfly), the milkweed butterfly Protoploea apatela from the New Guinea region
- Abraxas grossulariata, a moth in the family Geometridae, called the magpie in Great Britain and Ireland
- Eurrhypara hortulata, a moth in the family Pyralidae, called the small magpie in Great Britain and Ireland
- Nyctemera amicus, a moth in the family Arctiidae from south-east Asia and Australasia, sometimes called the magpie moth
- Nyctemera annulata, a moth in the family Arctiidae, called the magpie moth in New Zealand

=== Other animals ===
- Australian magpie, a medium-sized black and white passerine bird native to Australia and southern New Guinea
- Magpie cat, a bicolor cat with irregular black-and-white spotting
- Magpie perch or magpie morwong (Cheilodactylus nigripes), a fish of family Cheilodactylidae

== Places ==
- Magpie, a settlement in the municipality of Rivière-Saint-Jean, Quebec, Canada
- Magpie Creek, a stream in North Dakota, US
- Magpie Lane, Oxford, a very narrow historic lane in central Oxford, England
- Magpie River (Ontario), Canada
- Magpie River (Quebec), Canada
- Magpie, Quebec, a community in Canada
- Magpie, Victoria, a suburb of Ballarat in Australia

== Sports clubs ==
=== Australia ===
- Collingwood Magpies, an Australian Football League club
- Hay Magpies, a rugby league club based in the New South Wales town of Hay
- Port Adelaide Magpies, a South Australian National Football League club
- Souths Logan Magpies, a Queensland Cup club
- Western Suburbs Magpies, a NSWRL Premier League club
- Western Magpies Australian Football Club, an AFL Queensland State League club
- Western Suburbs Magpies AFC, an Australian rules football club in Sydney

=== United Kingdom ===
- Chorley F.C., an English football club
- Newcastle United F.C., an English football club
- Notts County F.C., an English football club
- Maidenhead United F.C., an English football club

=== Elsewhere ===
- F.C. Bruno's Magpies, a Gibraltar football club
- Rabat Ajax F.C., a Maltese football club
- New York Magpies, US Australian Football League team
- Hawke's Bay (National Provincial Championship), a New Zealand rugby union team

== Music ==
=== Songs ===
- "The Magpie", a Russian art song; see List of compositions by Modest Mussorgsky
- "Magpie", B-side of the 1994 single "Girls & Boys" by the English rock band Blur
- "Magpie", on The Magic Position by Patrick Wolf
- "Morning Mr. Magpie", on the 2011 album The King of Limbs by the English band Radiohead
- "Magpie", a song by The Mountain Goats on The Sunset Tree
- "Magpie to the Morning", from the 2009 album Middle Cyclone by the American folk singer Neko Case
- "Magpie", from the 2015 album Mount the Air by The Unthanks, based on the nursery rhyme "One for Sorrow"

=== Other uses in music ===
- Magpie Records, a British record label set up in 1976 by Bruce Bastin
- Magpie (folk duo), an American folk duo formed in the 1970s
- Magpie, an album by Stephen Fretwell

== Film and television ==
- Magpie (TV series), British children's television show, broadcast 1968–1980 on ITV
- Magpie (film), 2024 British neo-noir directed by Sam Yates
- Magpie (character), a kleptomaniac supervillain in the Batman series of comics
- "The Magpie" (Patience), a 2026 television episode

== Other uses ==
- HMS Magpie, eight Royal Navy ships
- MAGPIE, a pulsed-power generator based at Imperial College London
- MAgPIE, a scientific model for land and water use
- The Magpie (Monet) ("La Pie"), an 1869 painting by Monet
- Magpie, Carmarthen and Cardigan Railway steam locomotive built in 1861
- Magpie, a serif typeface designed by Vincent Connare
- Magpie, the magazine of the now defunct Paedophile Information Exchange (PIE)

== See also ==
- MAGPIE (rover)
- "The Magpies", the most famous poem by New Zealand poet Denis Glover (1912–1980)
- The Other Magpie, a Native American woman who fought in the Black Hills War
- Thieving Magpie (disambiguation)
