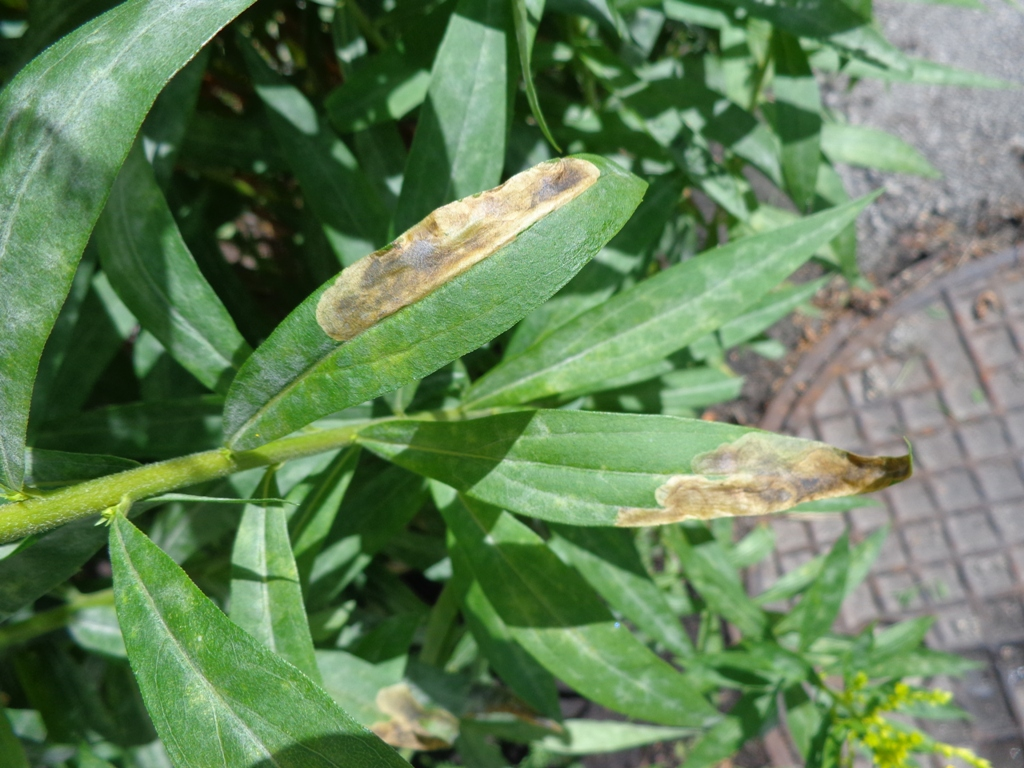
- Nemorimyza posticata leafmines.

Scientific classification
- Kingdom: Animalia
- Phylum: Arthropoda
- Clade: Pancrustacea
- Class: Insecta
- Order: Diptera
- Family: Agromyzidae
- Subfamily: Phytomyzinae
- Genus: Nemorimyza
- Species: N. posticata

Binomial name
- Nemorimyza posticata (Meigen, 1830)

Synonyms
- Agromyza argenteolunulata Strobl, 1909; Agromyza posticata Meigen, 1830; Agromyza taeniola Coquillett, 1904; Agromyza terminalis Coquillett, 1895

= Nemorimyza posticata =

Species of fly

Nemorimyza posticata is a species of fly in the family Agromyzidae. It is found in the Palearctic.

== Description ==
Interocular space matte black. Lunule soft black. Antennae and palps black. Mesonotum brilliant black. Acrostichal bristles sparse and in 7-8 rows. Legs brownish black all the knees yellow. Haltere knob whitish yellow. Female: abdomen black, les the two last segments clear brown. Male: The base of the abdomen more or less dark, the rest yellow. Length: 2,5–3 mm.

== Life cycle ==
The larva mines Solidago, Aster, Baccharis, and Erechtites.
