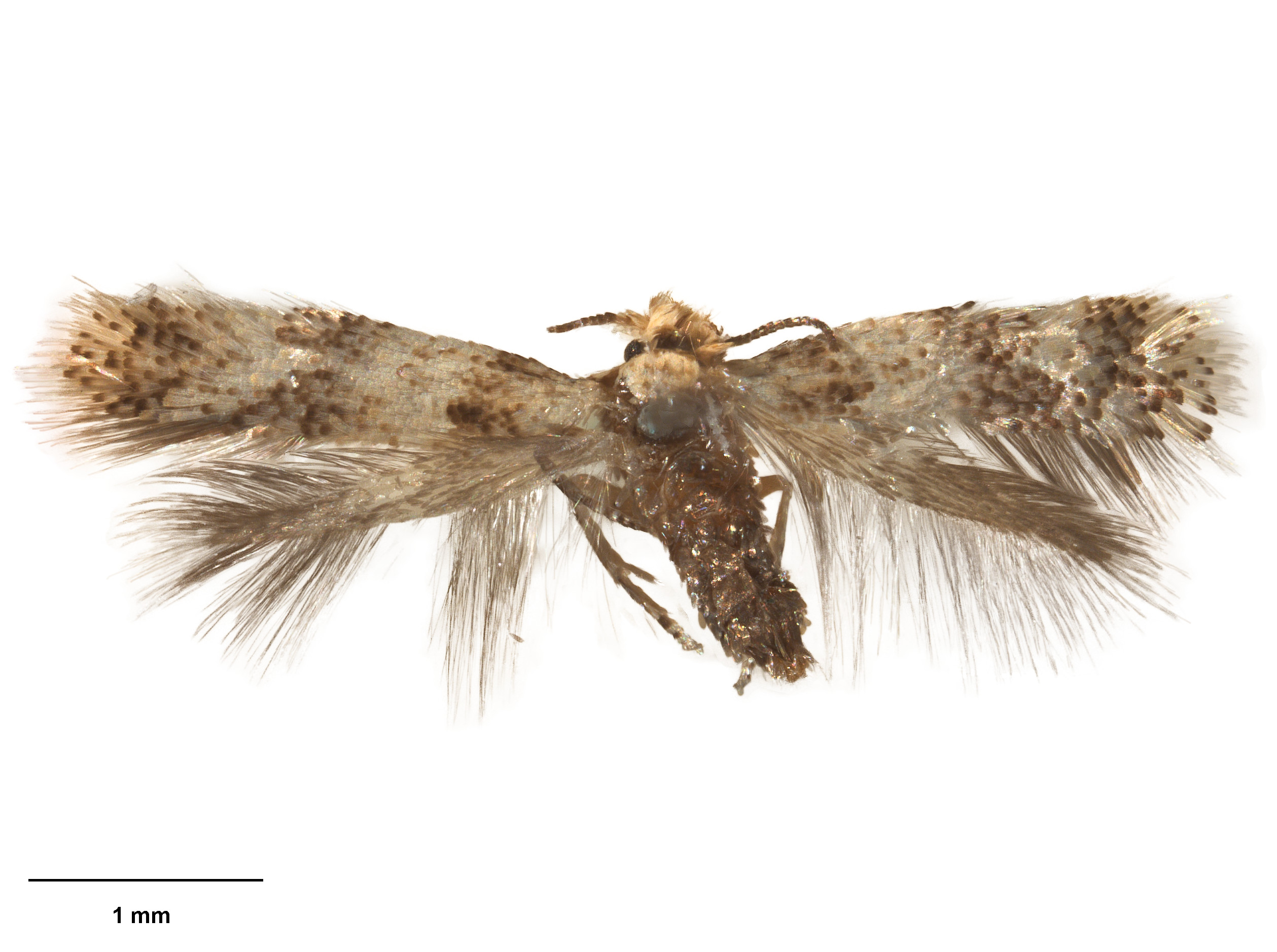

Scientific classification
- Kingdom: Animalia
- Phylum: Arthropoda
- Clade: Pancrustacea
- Class: Insecta
- Order: Lepidoptera
- Family: Nepticulidae
- Genus: Stigmella
- Species: S. ogygia

Binomial name
- Stigmella ogygia (Meyrick, 1889)

Synonyms
- Nepticula ogygia Meyrick, 1889; Nepticula tricentra Meyrick sensu Watt, 1921 (misidentification); Nepticula erechtitus Watt, 1924; Nepticula erichtitus (Watt, 1924) (misspelling); Stignella erectitus (Watt, 1924)

= Stigmella ogygia =

Species of moth endemic to New Zealand

Stigmella ogygia is a moth of the family Nepticulidae. This species was first described by Edward Meyrick in 1889. It is endemic to New Zealand and is found in the North, South and Stewart Islands. This species inhabits the margins of native forest where its larval plant host species are found. Eggs are laid singly on the upper side of the host plant leaf and the larva burrows directly through the bottom of the egg into the leaf-substance. The larvae mine the leaves of Senecio species including Senecio biserratus and Senecio minimus, as well as the leaves of Brachyglottis turneri. The larva emerges from its mine and pupates on the ground near of the larval host plant. Adults are day flying and have been recorded on the wing in March, July and from September to December. There are probably continuous generations throughout the year.

== Taxonomy ==
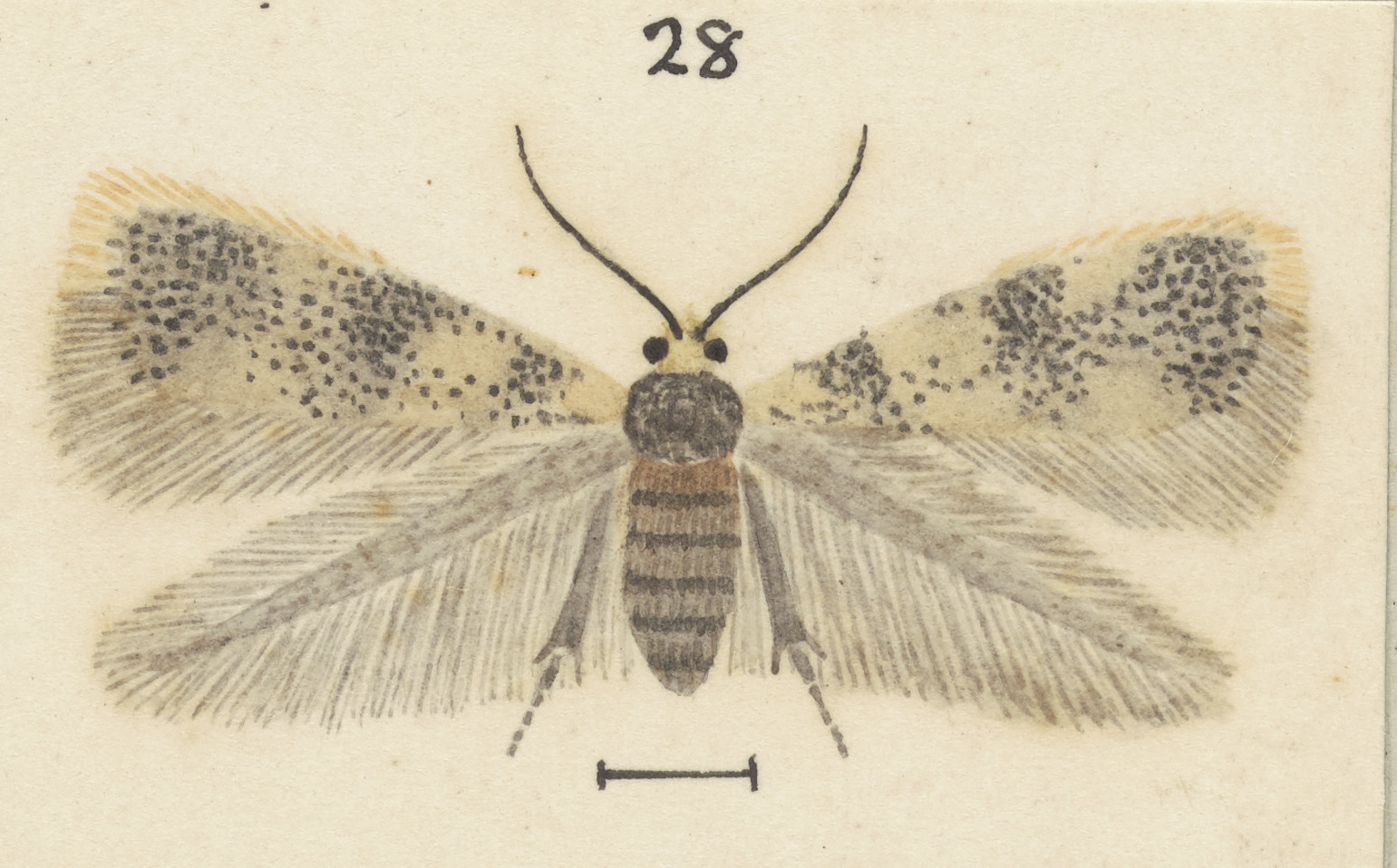
Illustration by Hudson.

This species was first described by Edward Meyrick in 1889 and originally named Nepticula ogygia using a specimen collected in Dunedin in January. Morris N. Watt went on to give detailed information about the description and life cycle of this moth in 1921. In 1924 Watt, thinking he was describing a new species, named this species Nepticula erechtitus. In 1928 George Hudson discussed that species under the name Nepticula ogygia and Nepticula erichtitus (a misspelling of the epithet erechtitus), and also illustrated a specimen under that latter name, in his book The butterflies and moths of New Zealand. In 1988 John S. Dugdale placed Nepticula ogygia and Nepticula erechtitus in the genus Stigmella. In 1989 Hans Donner and Christopher Wilkinson agreed with this placement in their monograph on New Zealand Nepticulidae and also synonymised Stigmella erechtitus with Stigmella ogygia. This placement was again confirmed in a 2016 revision of the global species placed in the family Nepticulidae. The male holotype is held at the Natural History Museum, London.

== Description ==
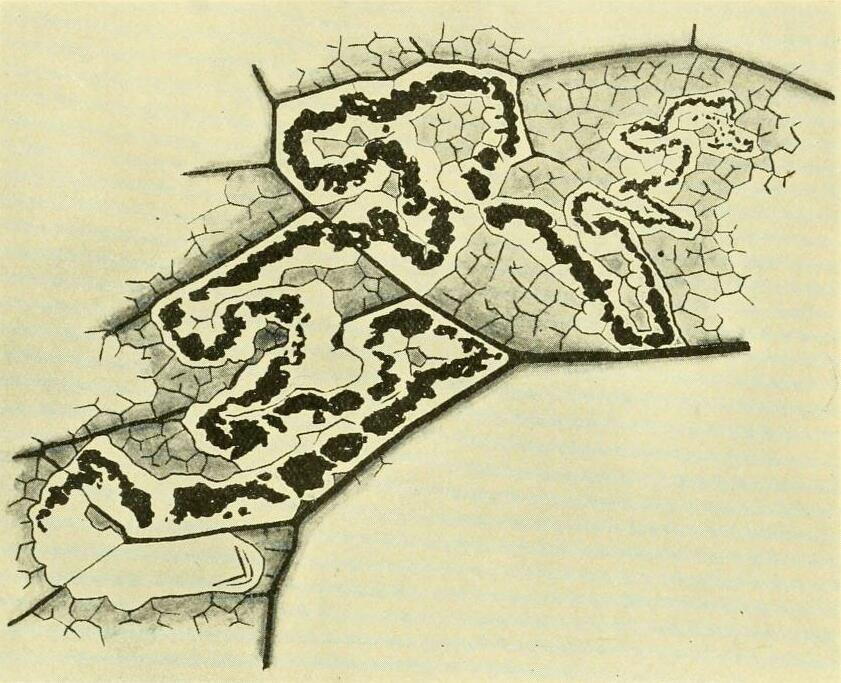
Leaf mine of S. ogygia.

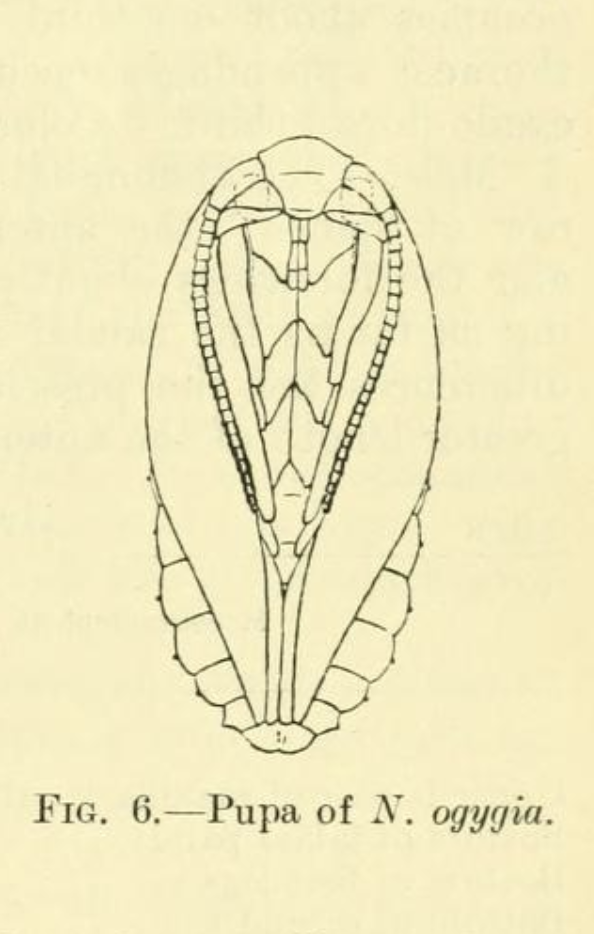
Pupa of S. ogygia

Egg

Watt described the eggs of this species as being bright blue when first laid and as it develops it turns a yellowish colour. They are oval, wafer-like, and flattened against the leaf where it is attached, rounded above. Around the outer margin of the egg the shell is slightly produced so as to form a flattened foot or fringe closely applied to the surface of the leaf. This fringe is a slight degree wider at the micropylar end of the egg.

Leaf mine

The mine is a narrow, usually more or less tortuous gallery, constructed entirely under the upper cuticle of the leaf. The gallery is not a long with its average length ranging from 4 to 6 cm. Its course follows the coarser ribs of the leaf, these and the midrib forming a bar to progress across them. The frass is black and coarsely granular, abundant, and occupies an almost unbroken chain along the middle half or three-quarters of the gallery. However it is entirely absent in the terminal half-centimetre of the mine.

Larva

When full-grown, the larva is very pale green, with a comparatively broad dark-green central line. It has a headpiece of pale amber-brown, darker round external margins, clypeal sutures, and mouth-parts.

Cocoon

Watt described the cocoon as follows:

... somewhat ovate, mussel-shaped, ends rounded, anterior end slightly flattened and broader than its nadir. The outlet of the cocoon is guarded by a pair of flattened closely-applied lips extending across the whole front of the cocoon. Length averaging 3mm., width 2-2.5 mm., height 1-1.5 mm. Colour at first whitish, changing to light green, to dark brown; occasionally the cocoons retain their green colour throughout. Interior of cocoon whitish. Texture thin but dense, forming a kind of skin, and surrounded outside, except where attached to external objects, by a small amount of light floccy silk.

Pupa

Watt gave a detailed description of the pupa which included the following:

... the front is rounded and bluntly prominent; laterally there is a small incisura between it and the base of the antenna; this latter occupies the lateral outline for only a very short distance. The upper half of the lateral outline is evenly curved convex and is formed by the forewing; the lower half is also curved convex but is interrupted by the depression between each segment, it is occupied by segments 3 to 10 inclusive; a small amount of the prominent spiracles appears on the lateral aspect of each segment, those on the eighth being especially prominent. The last abdominal segment is bluntly rounded and is slightly notched caudad; the genital opening can be detected on its ventral surface.

Adult

Meyrick described the adult male of this species as follows:

♂. 7 mm. Head and palpi pale whitish-ochreous. Antennae grey. Thorax and abdomen grey, sprinkled with ochreous-whitish. Legs dark grey, apex of joints whitish. Forewings lanceolate; pale grey, coarsely irrorated with black; an obscure cloudy ochreous-whitish suffusion towards costa at 2/3; an obscurely-indicated pale spot in disc before middle : cilia whitish-ochreous-grey, with an obscure line of dark scales round apex. Hindwings and cilia light grey.

Watt described a newly emerged specimen of this species as follows:

Head and palpi pale yellowish-ochreous, collar and basal joint of antenna whitish. Antennae pale grey, under 1, about 1/2. Thorax grey, densely irrorated with black. Legs and abdomen light grey. Forewings pale grey, thickly irrorated with black scales; a small pale area on dorsum near tornus (this appears to be the most constant marking, and is quite conspicuous when the wings are folded at rest, when the two areas form a small saddle-shaped spot on the dorsum); in the female there is a second similar area on costa, and frequently the two may form an obscure light band across the wing; a very diffuse pale spot in disc at 1/4, frequently absent; a series of four small black spots in middle of wing, one at 1/4, 1/3, 1/2, and the fourth less distinct near termen; these spots are definitely fixed as to position, but one or more or all may be absent, that at 1/2 being the most constant: cilia pale grey with bluish reflections, a distinct black cilial line. Hindwings dark grey; cilia dark grey.

Watt points out that this species can be variable in appearance with some specimens having a reduced amount of dark irroration in the forewing and the moth appearing to the naked eye as light grey instead of black. At rest the colouration of the adult moth is protective and ensures it is difficult to see.

== Distribution ==
S. ogygia is endemic to New Zealand. This species is found in both the North, South and Stewart Islands.

== Habitat and host species ==
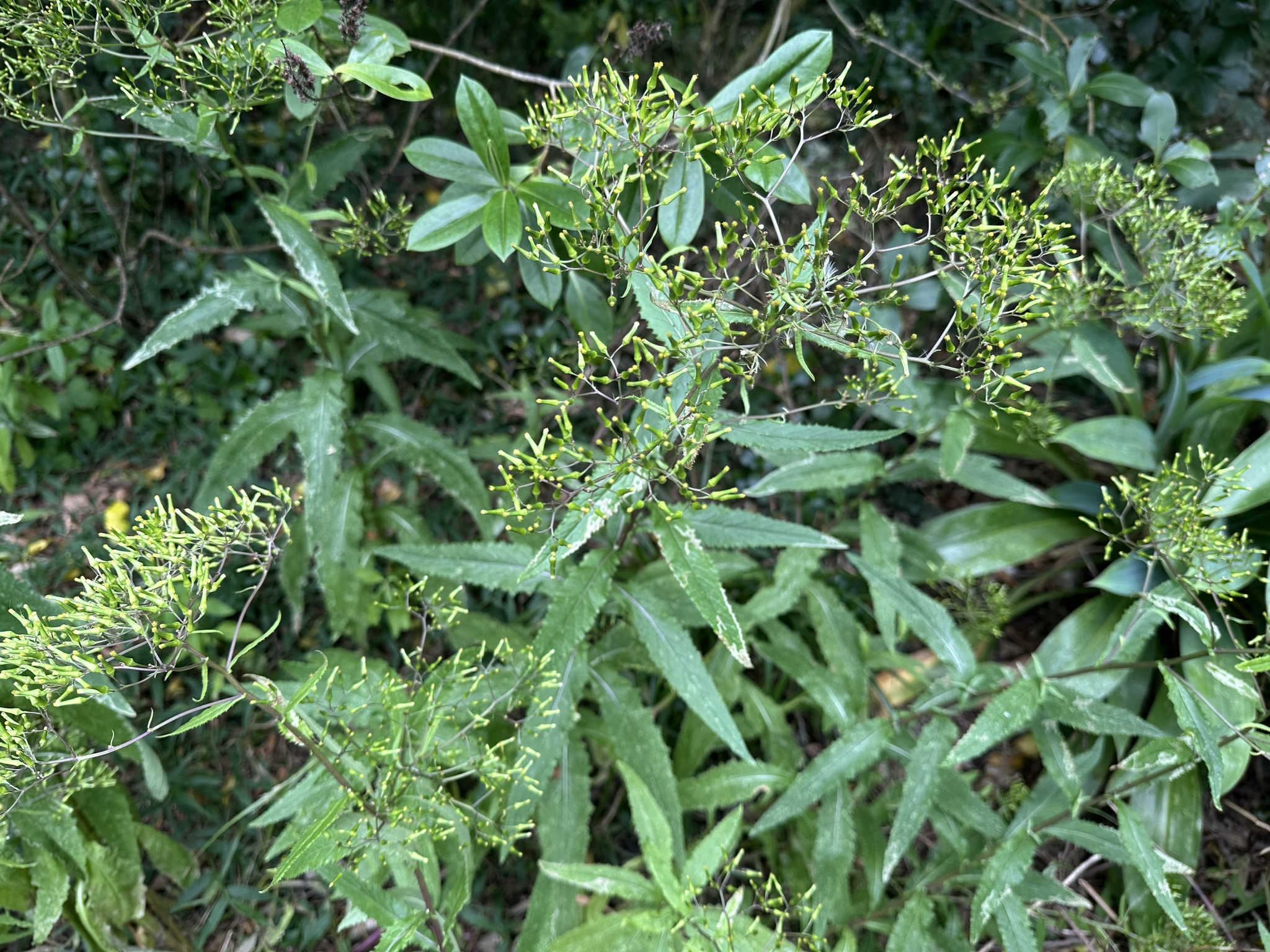
Larval host plant Senecio minimus.

This species inhabits the margins of native forest where its larval plant host species are found. The larvae feed on Senecio species, including Senecio biserratus and Senecio minimus, as well as Brachyglottis turneri. They mine the leaves of their host plant.

== Biology and behaviour ==
Eggs are laid singly on the upper side of the host plant leaf and the larva burrows directly through the bottom of the egg into the leaf-substance. The larva mines dorsum uppermost and can be seen by holding the leaf up to the light. The larva emerges from its mine through a semicircular cut in the roof of the gallery at its terminal part, and makes its way to the ground to pupate. The larva pupates amongst dead herbage on the ground in the neighbourhood of the food-plant. Adults have been recorded on the wing in March, July and from September to December. Reared specimens hatched in January, April, May and August. There are probably continuous generations throughout the year. Adult specimens are known to fly in bright sunshine but with any dimming of this light the adult moth will seek cover in dead vegetation or in the bark of its host plants. It rarely ventures far from its host plant.
