= Magpie River =

Magpie River may refer to:

- Magpie River (Ontario) in Ontario, Canada
- Magpie River (Quebec) in northern Quebec, Canada

== See also ==
- Magpie (disambiguation)
