= Thieving Magpie (disambiguation) =

The Thieving Magpie (La gazza ladra) is an 1817 Italian opera by Gioachino Rossini.

Thieving Magpie may also refer to:

- Thieving Magpie (film), a 1958 Soviet drama
  - Thieving Magpie (novel), 1848, by Alexander Herzen, the base of the film
- The Thieving Magpie (album), a 1988 double live album by Marillion, or its first track
- La Pie voleuse (The Thieving Magpie), an 1815 French play by Théodore Baudouin d'Aubigny and Louis-Charles Caigniez, the base of Rossini's opera
- La Pie voleuse, a 1939 novel by French writer Georges Limbour
- La Pie voleuse, French-language title of the 1987 American-Canadian film Burglar
- La Pie voleuse (2024 film) by Robert Guédiguian
- La gazza ladra, a 1934 short film by Corrado D'Errico
- La gazza ladra (animated film), 1964, by Emanuele Luzzati

== See also ==
- Magpie (disambiguation)
