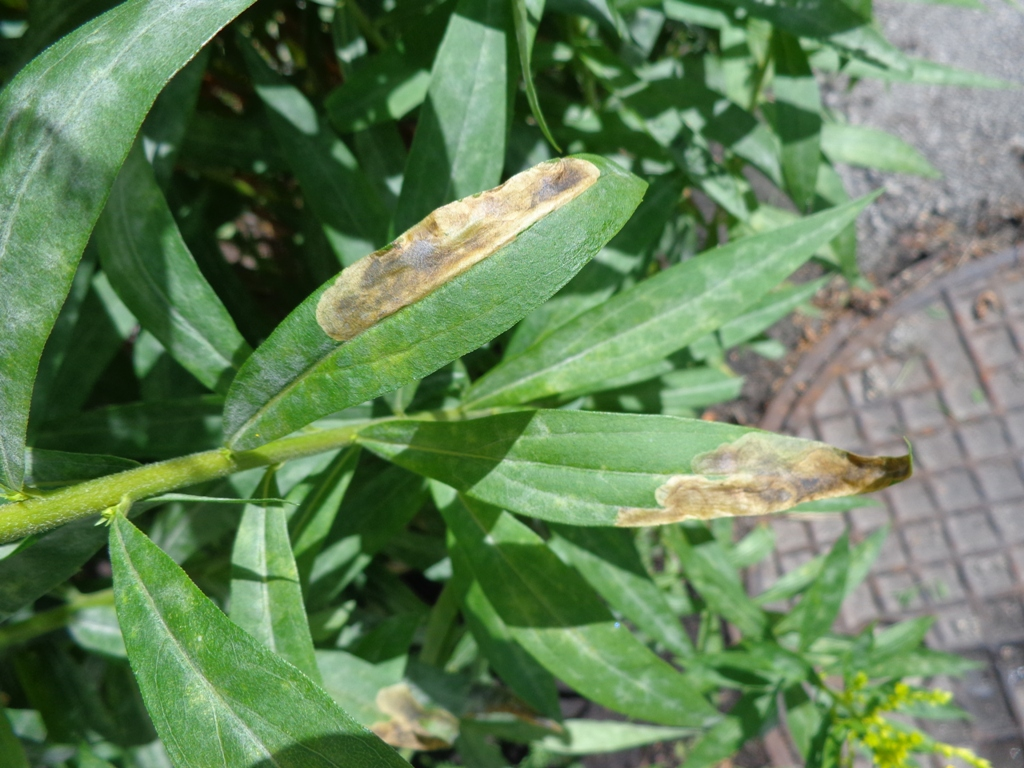
- Nemorimyza posticata leafmines.

Scientific classification
- Kingdom: Animalia
- Phylum: Arthropoda
- Class: Insecta
- Order: Diptera
- Family: Agromyzidae
- Subfamily: Phytomyzinae
- Genus: Nemorimyza; Frey, 1946

Type species
- Agromyza posticata Meigen, 1830

Synonyms
- Annimyzella Spencer, 1981

= Nemorimyza =

Genus of flies

Nemorimyza is a genus of flies in the family Agromyzidae.

== Species ==
- Nemorimyza lebongi (Beri & Ipe, 1971)
- Nemorimyza maculosa (Malloch, 1913)
- Nemorimyza posticata (Meigen, 1830)
