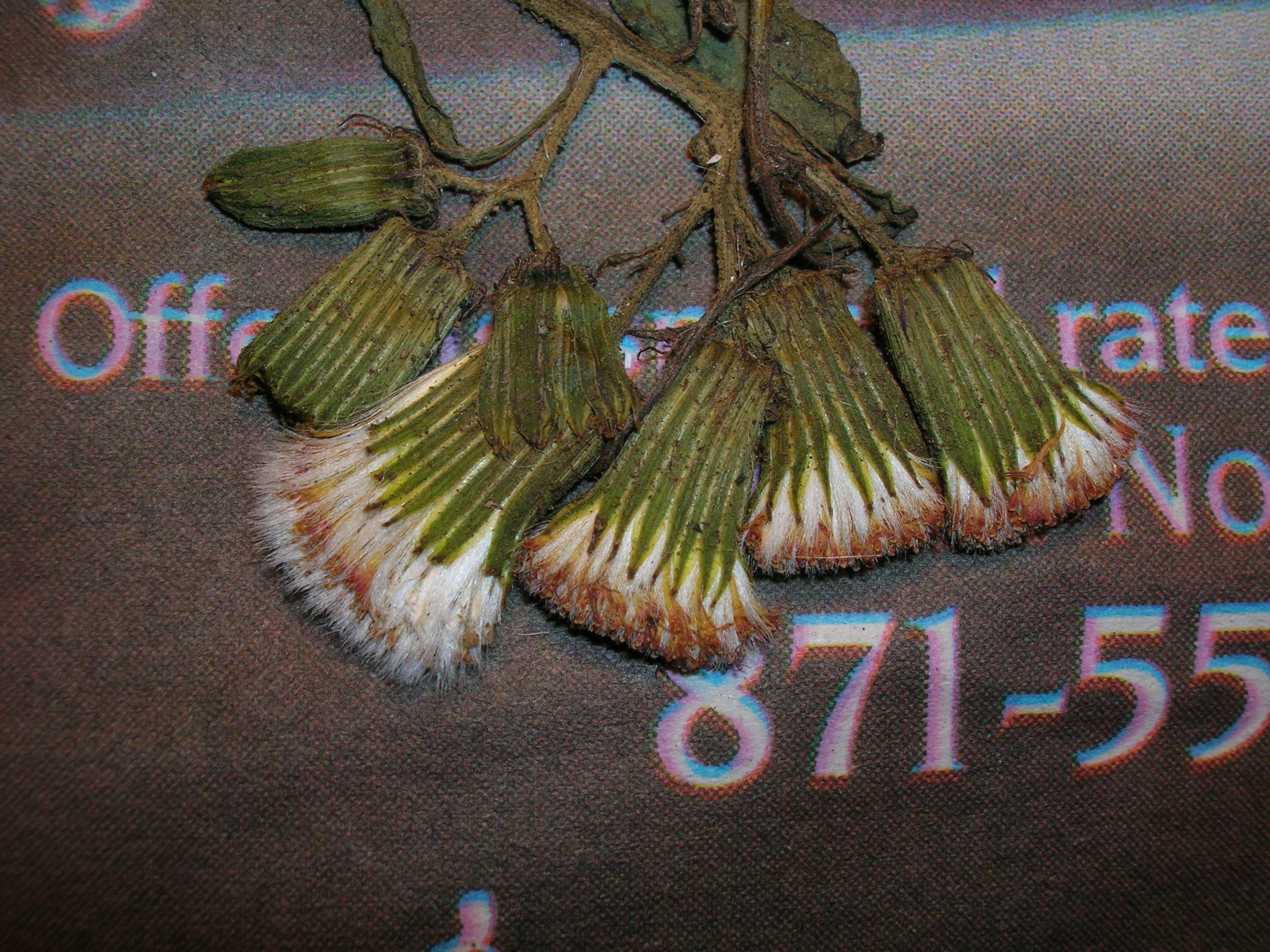

Scientific classification
- Kingdom: Plantae
- Clade: Tracheophytes
- Clade: Angiosperms
- Clade: Eudicots
- Clade: Asterids
- Order: Asterales
- Family: Asteraceae
- Genus: Erechtites
- Species: E. valerianifolius

Binomial name
- Erechtites valerianifolius (Link ex Spreng.) DC

Synonyms
- Senecio valerianaefolia Link ex Spreng.; Senecio valerianaefolius Link ex Spreng.; Senecio valerianifolius Link ex Spreng.; Crassocephalum valerianifolium (Link ex Spreng.) Less.

= Erechtites valerianifolius =

Species of flowering plant

Erechtites valerianifolius, common name tropical burnweed is a New World species of plants in the sunflower family. It is native to Mexico, Central America, South America, and the West Indies. It is also naturalized as a weed in much of the tropical Old World.

== Description ==
Erechtites valerianifolius is an annual herb up to 100 cm (40 inches) tall. Leaves have long petioles with narrow wings along the sides, bearing oblong or elliptical blades with many pinnate lobes. One plant can produce many yellow or purple flower heads, each with both disc florets and ray florets.
