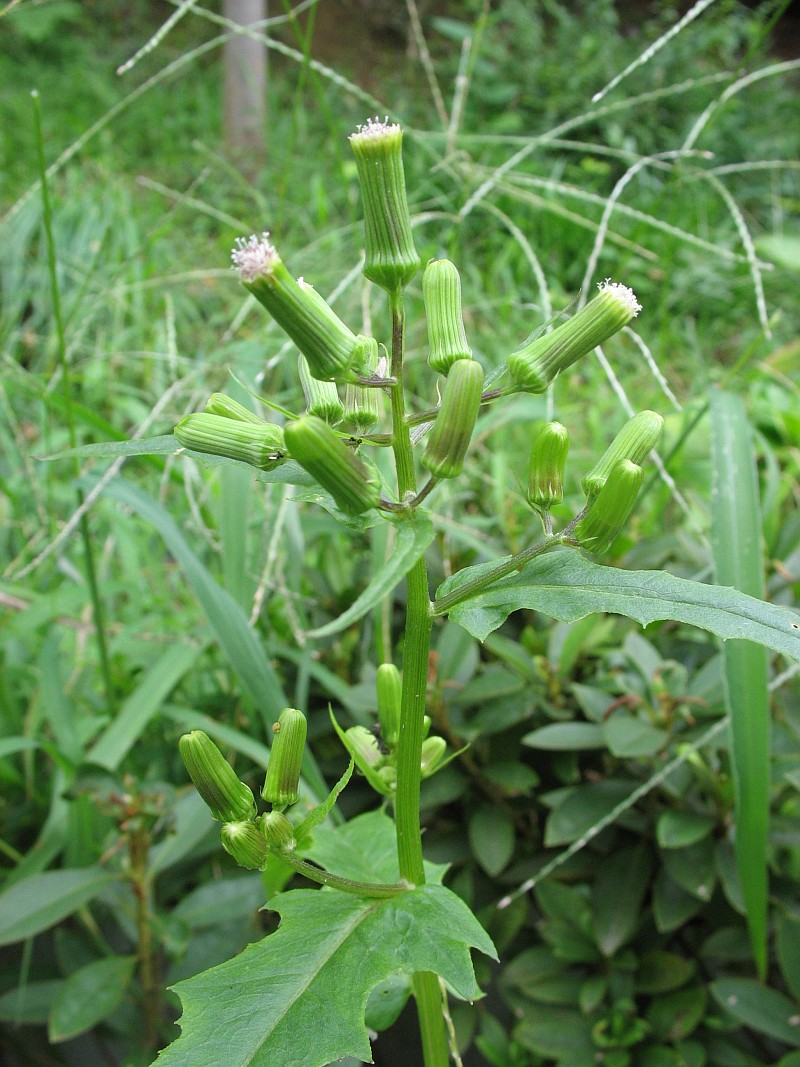
- Photo taken in Tokyo, Japan

Scientific classification
- Kingdom: Plantae
- Clade: Tracheophytes
- Clade: Angiosperms
- Clade: Eudicots
- Clade: Asterids
- Order: Asterales
- Family: Asteraceae
- Genus: Erechtites
- Species: E. hieraciifolius

Binomial name
- Erechtites hieraciifolius (L.) Raf. ex DC.

Synonyms
- Synonymy: Erechtites hieracifolius (L.) Raf. ex DC.; Erechtites hieraciifolia (L.) Raf. ex DC.; Erechtites hieracifolia (L.) Raf. ex DC.; Erechtites agrestis (Sw.) Standl. & Steyerm.; Erechtites cacalioides (Fisch. ex Spreng.) Less.; Erechtites carduifolius (Cass.) DC.; Erechtites praealtus Raf.; Erechtites sulcata Gardner; Gynura aspera Ridl.; Gynura malasica (Ridl.) Ridl.; Neoceis carduifolia Cass.; Senecio carduifolius (Cass.) Desf.; Senecio fischeri Sch.Bip.; Senecio hieraciifolius L.; Senecio hieracifolius L.; Gynura zeylanica Trim., syn of var. cacalioides; Ptileris hieracifolia (L.) Raf. ex B.D.Jacks., syn of var. cacalioides; Senecio cacalioides Fisch. ex Spreng., syn of var. cacalioides; Sonchus agrestis Swartz, syn of var. cacalioides; Erechtites megalocarpa Fernald, syn of var. megalocarpus

= Erechtites hieraciifolius =

Species of flowering plant

Erechtites hieraciifolius (fireweed, American burnweed, or pilewort) is a plant in the daisy family, Asteraceae. It is native to the Americas, but is found many places around the world having been introduced by human activity. such as in Hawaii, China, Europe and Southeast Asia.

== Description ==
Erechtites hieraciifolius is an annual herb with alternate, simple leaves, on thick, green stems that grow to 0.4–3 meters (1.3–9.8 ft) or more in height. The leaves are alternate, serrated, 5–20 centimeters (2.0–7.9 in) long, 0.5–6.5 cm (0.2–2.6 in) wide, and range from unlobed to deeply lobed, with the lobe pattern superficially resembling wild lettuces, which are in the same family but not closely related. When crushed, all parts of the species are aromatic. The flower heads are yellow or pink, borne in fall. The heads are followed by cluster of small, wispy achenes. The plant often branches and grows in a clump with multiple stems.

== Distribution and habitat ==
E. hieraciifolius is distributed from Newfoundland west to Saskatchewan and south to southern Florida and eastern Texas. It is also found in the West Indies and throughout tropical America. It grows in disturbed soil in almost any habitat except those that are extremely xeric, responding to even small disturbances such as a tree tip-up mound. It is most abundant in areas that have been extensively disturbed, like where severe fire, timber harvest, or bulldozing has occurred.

== Ecology ==
This species benefits from fire, and is often one of the earliest pioneer species of areas that have recently burned, hence some of its common names. It can germinate in response to fire, and litter removal has also been shown to improve germination success. E. hieraciifolius has been observed as opportunistically increasing in response to fire, but decreasing in the years following a fire disturbance to its original, pre-fire abundance.

It prefers moist sites but can handle gravelly soil and some degree of dry conditions. It also grows well in urban areas and around humans.

E. hieraciifolius is resistant to the herbicide imazypyr as well as imazypyr-glyphosate.

The flowers are pollinated primarily by wasps and honey bees (Apis mellifera). The seeds are wind-dispersed, and are used as a minor food source by birds.
