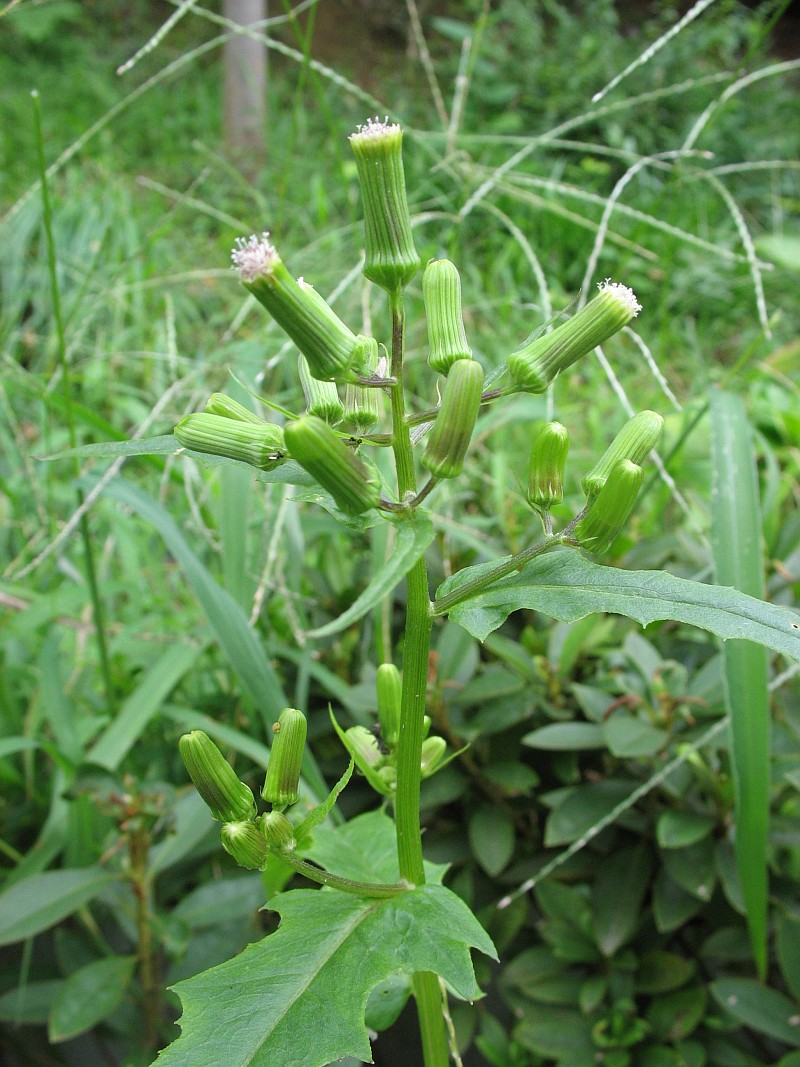
- Erechtites hieraciifolius

Scientific classification
- Kingdom: Plantae
- Clade: Tracheophytes
- Clade: Angiosperms
- Clade: Eudicots
- Clade: Asterids
- Order: Asterales
- Family: Asteraceae
- Subfamily: Asteroideae
- Tribe: Senecioneae
- Genus: Erechtites; Raf.

Type species
- Erechtites praealtus Raf., syn of E. hieraciifolius

Synonyms
- Senecio sect. Erechtites (Raf.) Baill.

= Erechtites =

Genus of flowering plants

Erechtites is a genus of flowering plants in the daisy family known commonly as fireweeds or burnweeds. They are native to the Americas and Australia, but some species are widely distributed weeds.

== Description ==
Erechtites consists of annual or perennial herbs with large taproots and very often with a pungent odor. Leaves are usually ovate or lanceolate (sometimes pinnately lobed or pinnatifid). Flower heads may sometimes contain as many as 100 yellow or white (rarely pink) disc florets but no ray florets.

== Taxonomy and species ==
Some species in this genus are treated as members of Senecio by some authors, and several other species are considered variants of Erechtites hieraciifolius, so there may be as few as 5 distinct species in this genus. In particular, not all authors agree on whether to include a dozen or so species native to Australia and New Zealand in Erechtites.

Species

27 species are recognised by Plants of the World Online

- Erechtites apargiifolius Sond. - Australia
- Erechtites atkinsoniae F.Muell. - Australia
- Erechtites bathurstianus DC. - Australia
- Erechtites bukaensis Rechinger & Muschl. - Solomon Islands
- Erechtites diversifolius Petrie. - New Zealand
- Erechtites glabrescens DC. - Australia
- Erechtites glomeratus (Desf. ex Poir.) DC. - Australia, New Zealand
- Erechtites glossanthus Sond. - Australia
- Erechtites goyazensis (Gardner) Cabrera - South America
- Erechtites gunnii Hook.f. - Australia
- Erechtites hieraciifolius (L.) Raf. ex DC. - North America, South America, West Indies; introduced in Europe and Asia
- Erechtites hispidulus (A.Rich.) DC. - Australia
- Erechtites ignobilis Baker - South America
- Erechtites kermadecensis (Belcher) Allan - Kermadec Islands
- Erechtites laceratus F.Muell. - Australia
- Erechtites leptanthus (Phil.) Cabrera - Chile
- Erechtites minimus (Poir.) DC. - Australia, New Zealand
- Erechtites missionum Malme - South America
- Erechtites petiolatus Benth. - South America
- Erechtites picridioides Turcz. - Australia
- Erechtites quadridentatus (Labill.) DC. - Australia, Java
- Erechtites runcinatus DC. - Mexico
- Erechtites scaberulus Hook.f. - New Zealand
- Erechtites sonchoides DC. - Australia, New Zealand
- Erechtites tenuiflorus DC. - Australia
- Erechtites valerianifolius (Link ex Spreng.) DC. - Mexico, South America, Central America
- Erechtites wairauensis (Belcher) Allan - New Zealand

Alternatively, a more limited genus circumscription restricts the genus to New World species and only recognises six species in two sections:

- Erechtites sect. Erechtites
  - Erechtites hieracifolius
  - Erechtites missionis
  - Erechtites valerianifolius
  - Erechtites petiolatus
- Erechtites sect. Goyazenses Belcher
  - Erechtites goyazensis
  - Erechtites ignobilis

The genus name Erechtites is considered masculine by some botanists and feminine by others. Hence some species names may end in "-us" or "-a," for example, Erechtites valerianifolius versus E. valerianifolia. International Code of Botanical Nomenclature (Art. 62.4) specifies that generic names ending in "-ites" are to be treated as masculine, hence the "-us" ending in such cases is to be preferred over the "-a" ending.
