= Magpie Creek =

Stream in North Dakota, U.S.

Coordinates: 47°21′57″N 103°36′13″W

Magpie Creek is a stream in North Dakota, in the United States.

Magpie Creek was named for the magpie birds native to North Dakota.

== See also ==
- List of rivers of North Dakota
