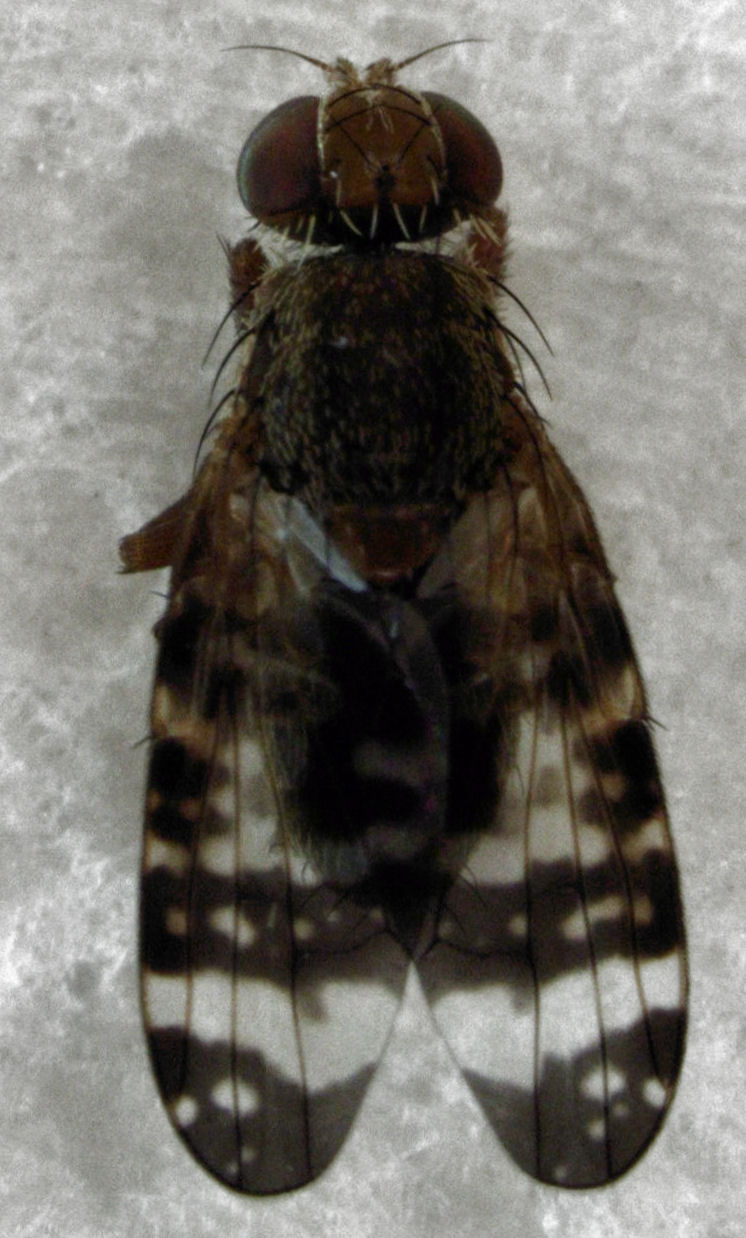
- Tephritis fascigera

Scientific classification
- Kingdom: Animalia
- Phylum: Arthropoda
- Class: Insecta
- Order: Diptera
- Family: Tephritidae
- Subfamily: Tephritinae
- Tribe: Tephritini
- Genus: Sphenella
- Species: S. fascigera

Binomial name
- Sphenella fascigera Malloch, 1931

= Sphenella fascigera =

Species of fly

Sphenella fascigera or the Senecio gall fly is a species of fruit fly that is endemic to New Zealand. It is a member of the genus Sphenella of the family Tephritidae, one of two families that are called "fruit flies". Its grubs gall in stems and capitula of plants in the Senecio genus.
