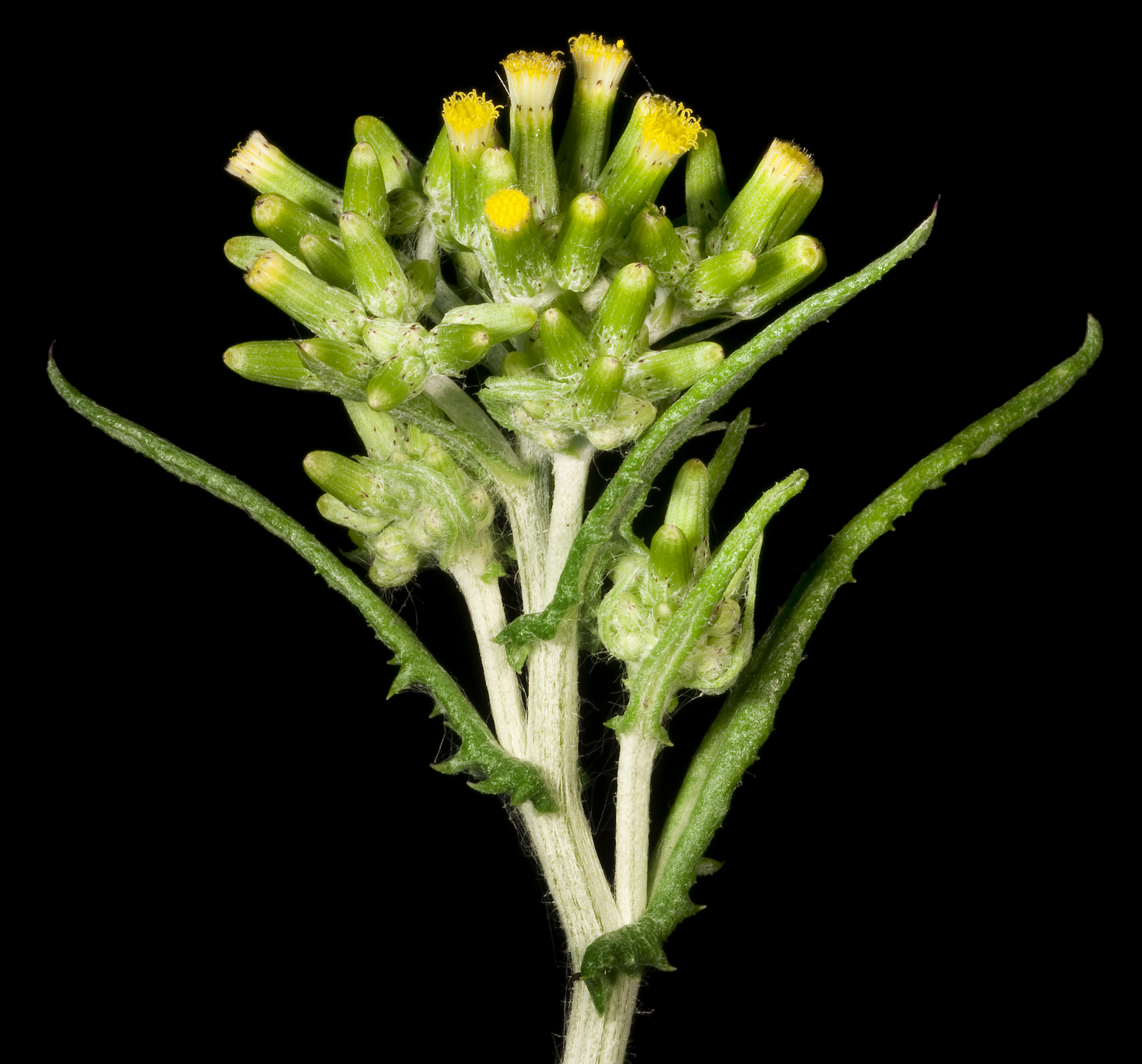

Scientific classification
- Kingdom: Plantae
- Clade: Tracheophytes
- Clade: Angiosperms
- Clade: Eudicots
- Clade: Asterids
- Order: Asterales
- Family: Asteraceae
- Genus: Erechtites
- Species: E. glomeratus

Binomial name
- Erechtites glomeratus (Desf. ex Poir.) DC.

Synonyms
- Erechtites glomerata (Desf. ex Poir.) DC.; Senecio glomerata Desf. ex Poir.; Senecio glomeratus Desf. ex Poir.; Erechtites argutus DC.; Senecio argutus A. Richard

= Erechtites glomeratus =

Species of flowering plant

Erechtites glomeratus, common name New Zealand fireweed, or cutleaf burnweed, or (in Australia) fireweed or Cluster-headed fireweed, is a species of plant in the sunflower family. It is native to Australia (all 6 states) and New Zealand, and also naturalized on the Pacific Coast of the United States (Washington, Oregon, and California).

The name accepted by Australian authorities is Senecio glomeratus, and this is also the name accepted by Plants of the World online. The name Erechtites glomeratus is considered by APNI to be illegal.

It was first described in 1817 by René Louiche Desfontaines as Senecio glomeratus, from a specimen cultivated in the Jardin des Plantes.

== Description ==
Erechtites glomeratus is an annual or perennial herb up to 200 cm (80 inches) tall. Leaves are lanceolate or linear with many pinnate lobes. One plant can produce as many as 120 yellow or purple flower heads, each with 50 or more disc florets but no ray florets.

== Gallery ==
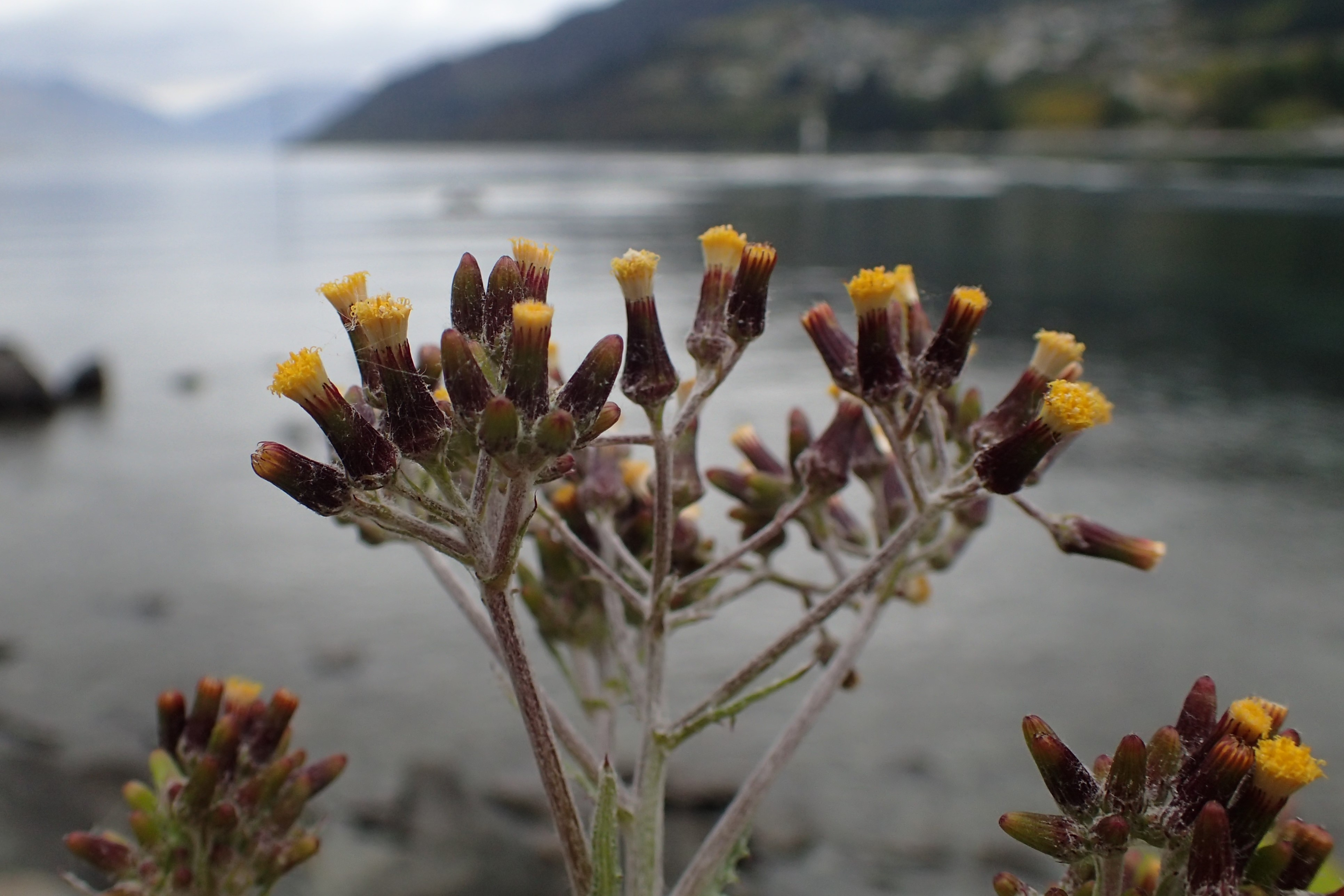

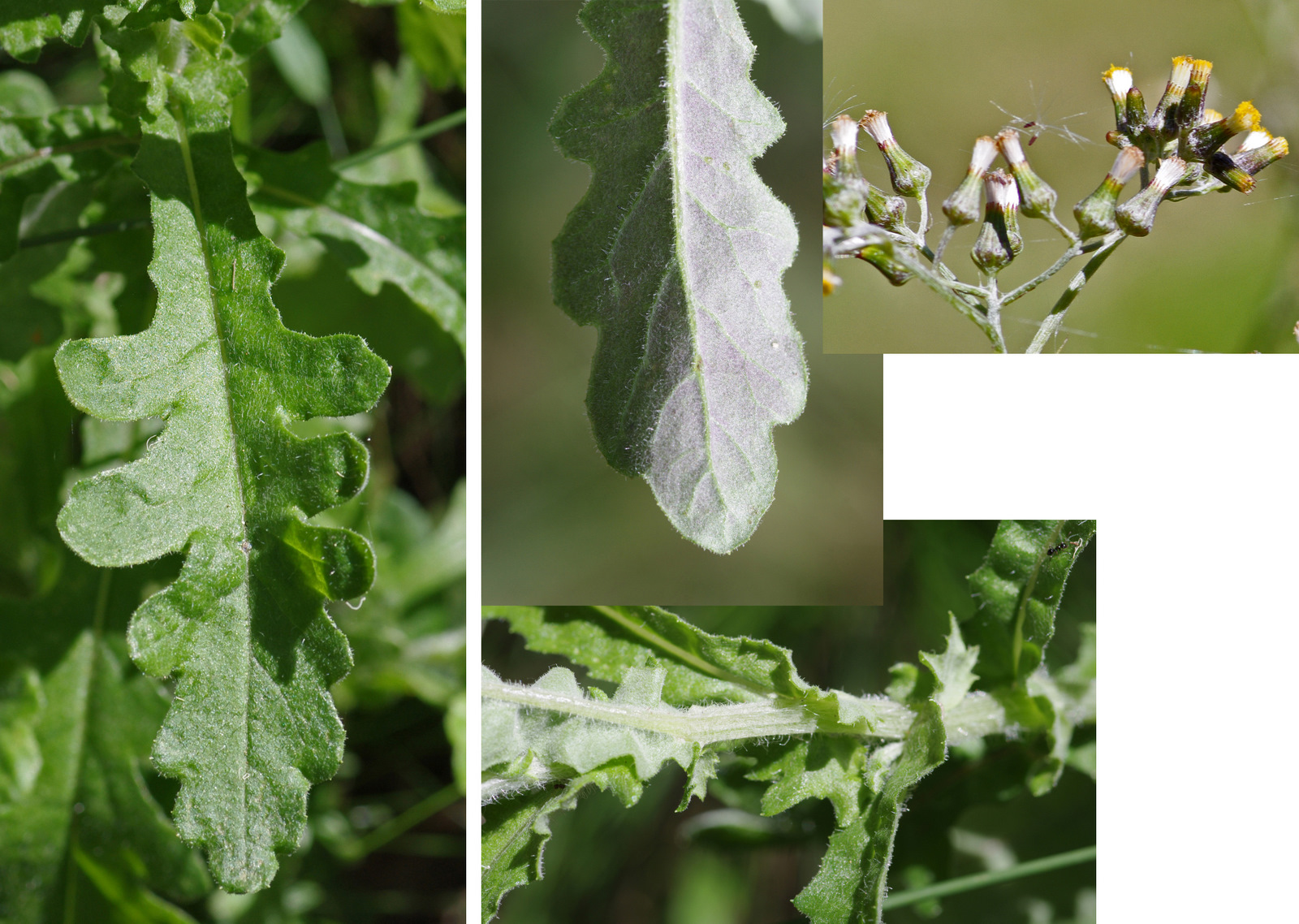

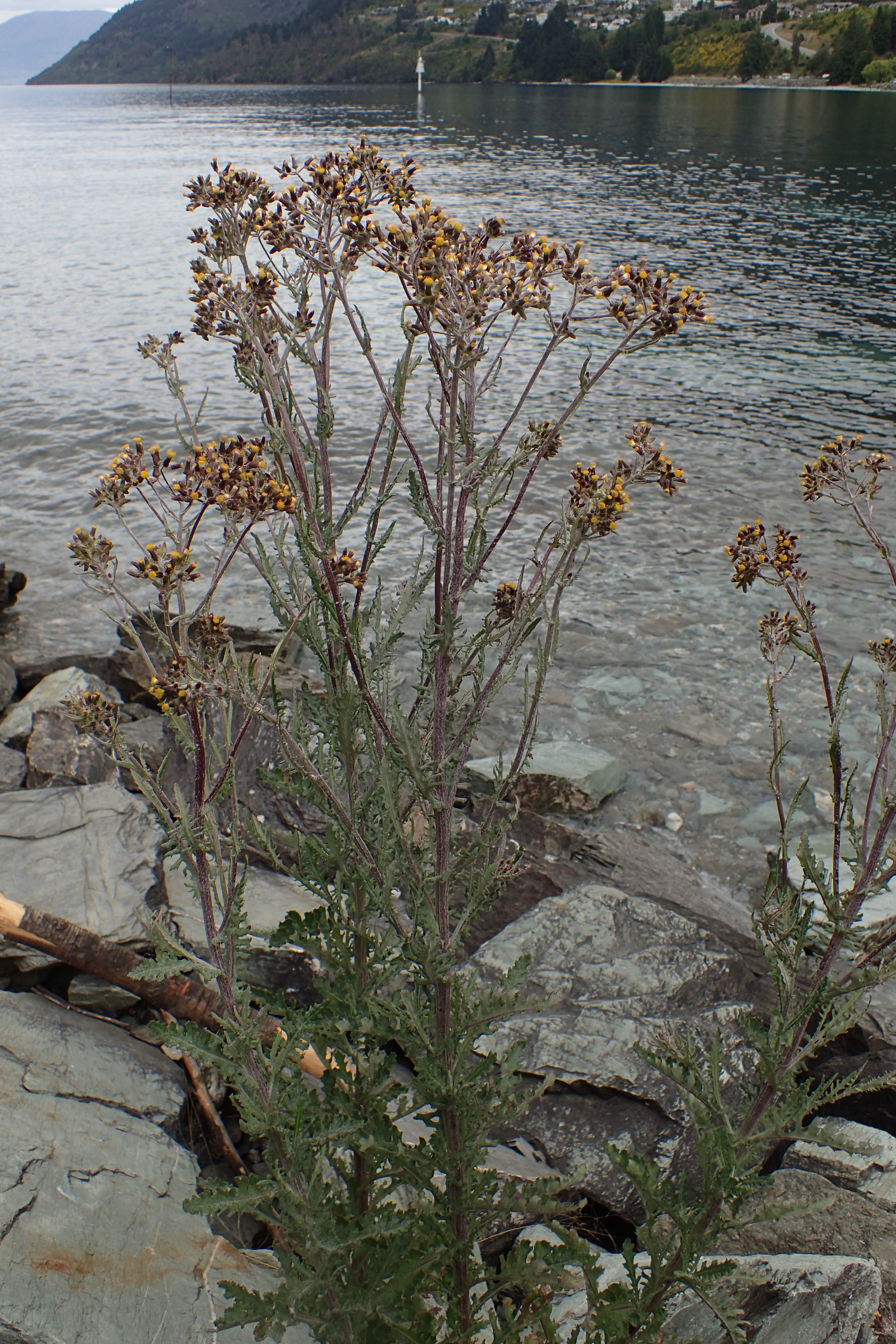
