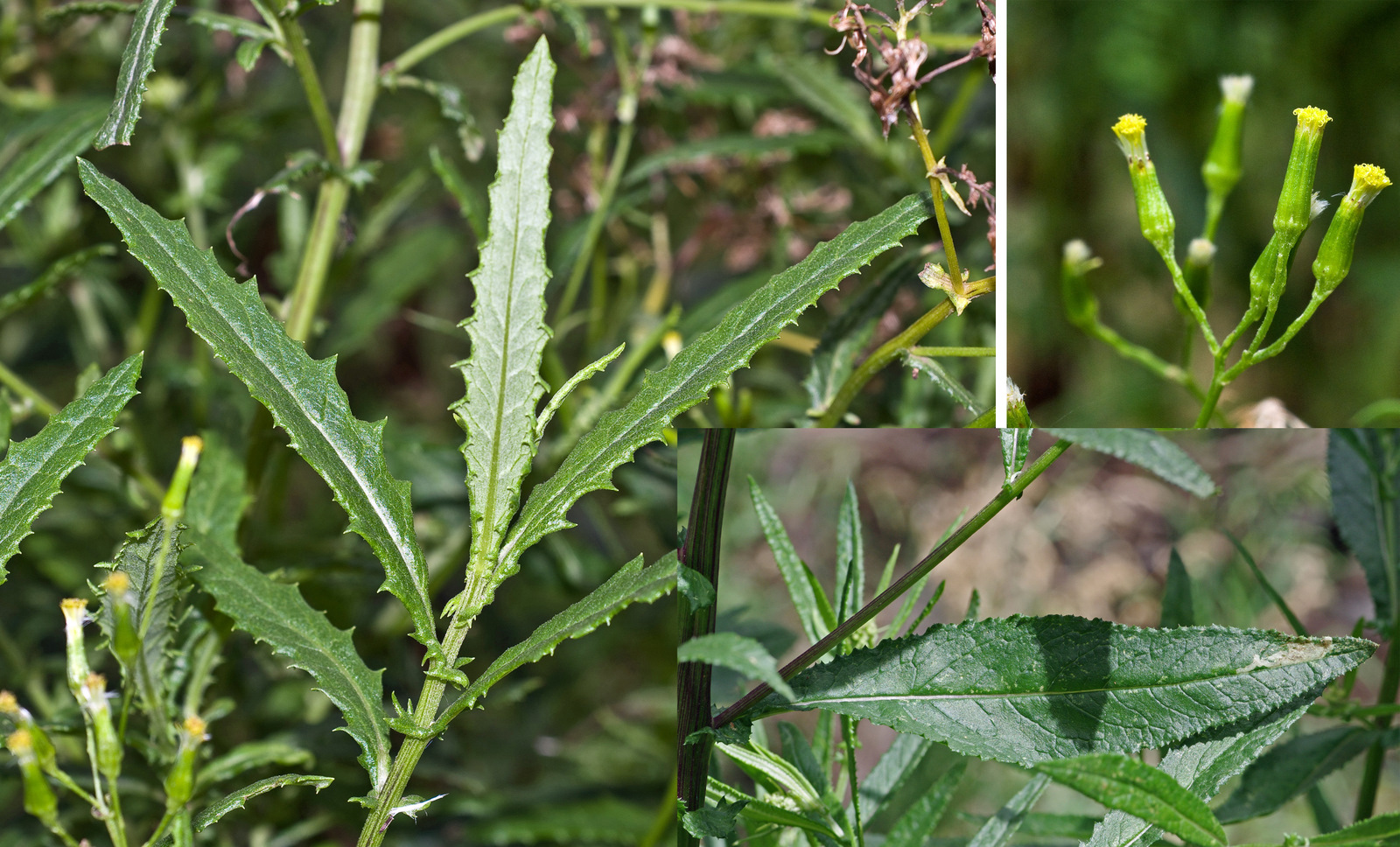

Scientific classification
- Kingdom: Plantae
- Clade: Tracheophytes
- Clade: Angiosperms
- Clade: Eudicots
- Clade: Asterids
- Order: Asterales
- Family: Asteraceae
- Genus: Senecio
- Species: S. minimus

Binomial name
- Senecio minimus Poir.

Synonyms
- Erechtites minima (Poir.) DC.; Erechtite minimus (Poir.) DC.

= Senecio minimus =

Species of plant

Senecio minimus (syn. Erechtites minumus), commonly known as toothed fireweed and coastal burnweed, is a species of plant in the sunflower family. It is native to Australia (all 6 states) and New Zealand, and also naturalized on the Pacific Coast of the United States (Washington, Oregon, and California), as well as parts of Britain and Ireland.

== Description ==
Senecio minimus is an annual or perennial herb up to 200 cm (79 in) tall. Leaves are toothed but not pinnately lobed. One plant can produce as many as 200 yellow or purple flower heads, each with many small disc florets but no ray florets. Its features include taproots with lateral roots that branch out into the soil. Senecio minimus has a tall upper stem, a mid stem and a basal stem. There is a leaf base from the mid stem which supports the leaves of the plant which are sized around 80-250mm long and are spaced evenly. The upper leaves of this species are narrow and linear shaped. They become widest at the auricles at the base of the leaf. The florets of Secenio minimus have triangular corolla lobes which become thicker apically. The stems are erect and are a dark green-purple colour. They have very small hairs below the mid stem, but above the stem it becomes more glabrous.

== Distribution ==
Senecio minimus is a species that is found not only in New Zealand and Australia but all over the world. It is naturally occurring in the US in states including California, Oregon and Washington. It is found in coastal parts of England. This species is also found in Australia in South-east Queensland, New South Wales, Tasmania, as well as parts of southwest and southeast Australia. Senecio minimus is indigenous to New Zealand and is found in the coastal areas around the Chatham Islands and Stewart Island. The species has been found in Malbrough, Nelson, Canterbury, Westland and Southland in the South Island of New Zealand as well as in North and South Auckland, Taranaki, Gisborne, Hawkes Bay and Wellington in the North Island. Senecio minimus prefers a coastal environment but occasionally extends to more subalpine environments in New Zealand. The species' ideal habitat is usually associated with forest margins. Senecio minimus is most commonly found in and around coastal habitats with forest or bush cover. It is also found in places where running water is present as well as shade from the sun. It can be seen in pasture land as well as tussock areas.

== Lifecycle ==
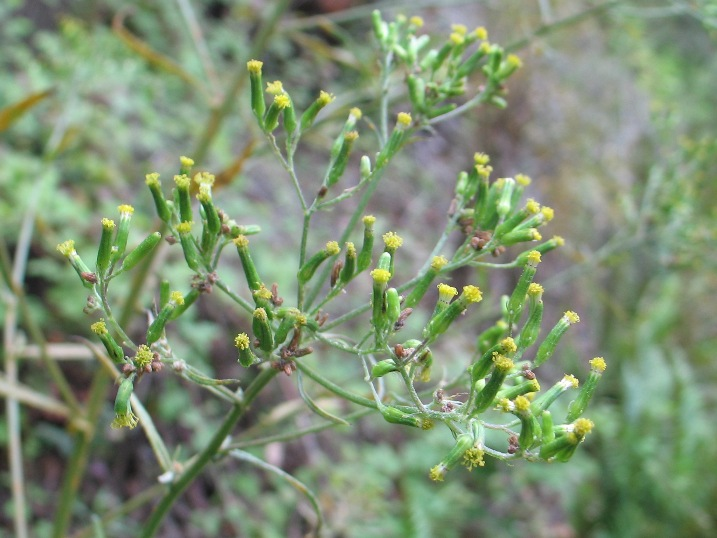
Flowers

Senecio minimus is an angiosperm which is a flowering plant. It flowers throughout the year but is more predominant in the summer months. Angiosperms produce fruit that contains the seeds of the plant. Senecio minimus fruit throughout the year but most often produce during late summer and early autumn. Seeds will only germinate if conditions are favourable during the summer period. Seeds are dispersed via wind. After this species flowers, it goes to seed. These seeds are found in the capitulum. The capitulum is the head of a stalk, which consists of a flat, dense cluster of small florets. When it goes to seed, seeds are released and dispersed by the wind. Wind carries the seeds to a new destination where, if not dormant, the seeds germinate almost immediately.

== Interactions ==
Senecio minimus grows in coastal areas. Coastal soils are usually a combination of clay, sand and silt, with the dominant soil texture being a clay loam. Senecio minimus is the host to three endemic herbivores: The magpie moth (Nyctemera annulata), the blue stem borer (Patagoniodes farnaria), and the Senecio gall fly (Tephritis fascigera). These species use Senecio minimus for feed and an environment to inhibit. Senecio minimus influences the abundance of insects on and around it. This is because it is a species that insects commonly use to colonise.

== Further information ==
In Otago, the conservation status of Senecio minimus is threatened. The Otago conservation management strategy classifies it as nationally vulnerable.
