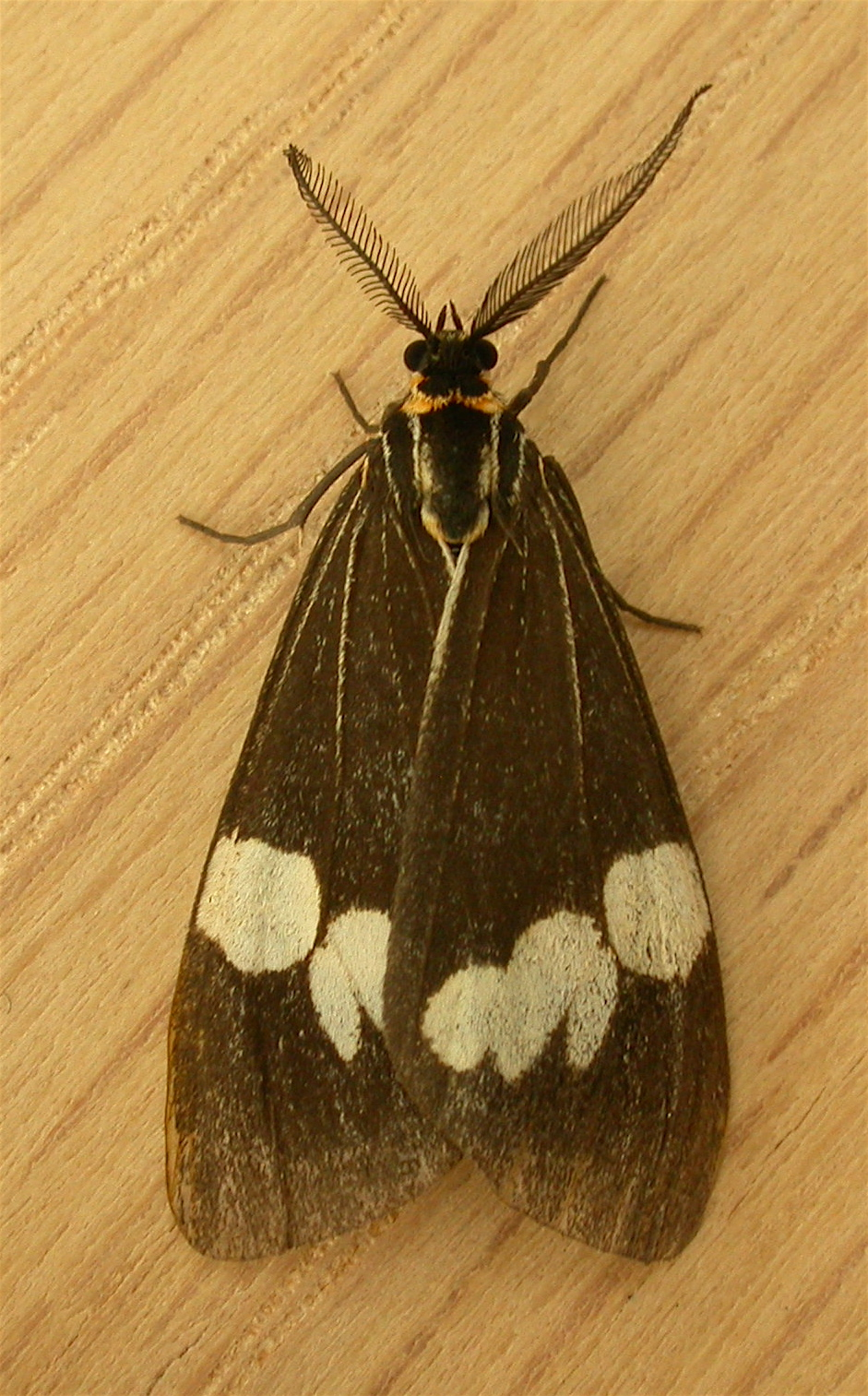

Scientific classification
- Domain: Eukaryota
- Kingdom: Animalia
- Phylum: Arthropoda
- Class: Insecta
- Order: Lepidoptera
- Superfamily: Noctuoidea
- Family: Erebidae
- Subfamily: Arctiinae
- Genus: Nyctemera
- Species: N. amicus

Binomial name
- Nyctemera amicus (White, 1841)

Synonyms
- Agagles amica White, 1841; Leptosoma plagiatum Guenée, 1868

= Nyctemera amicus =

Species of moth

Nyctemera amicus, the senecio moth, magpie moth or cineraria moth, is a moth of the family Erebidae. The species was first described by Adam White in 1841. It is found in South-east Asia, Oceania, and most of Australia. It can also be found in New Zealand.

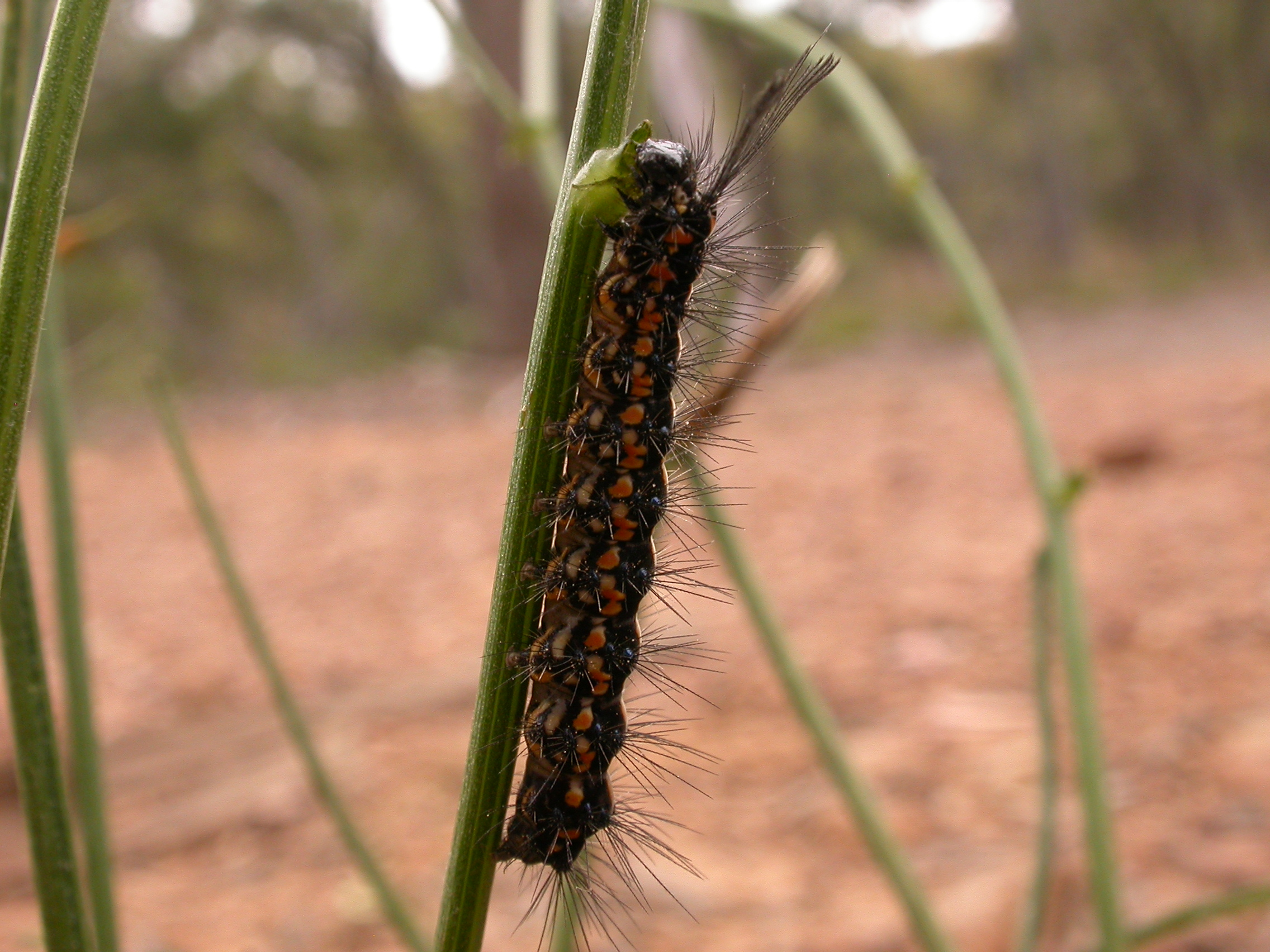
Larva

The larvae feed on Senecio species including S. linearifolius, S. quadridentatus, S. mikanioides, S. cruentus, and S. scandens. These food plants contain pyrrolizidine alkaloids, making the larvae unpleasant to taste and poisonous to birds.
