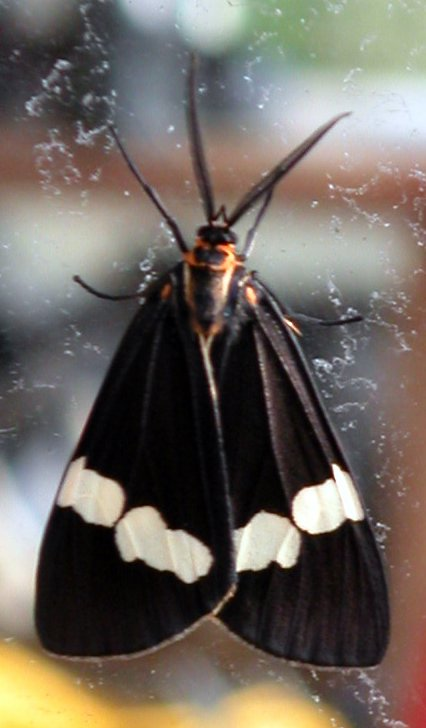

Scientific classification
- Kingdom: Animalia
- Phylum: Arthropoda
- Clade: Pancrustacea
- Class: Insecta
- Order: Lepidoptera
- Superfamily: Noctuoidea
- Family: Erebidae
- Subfamily: Arctiinae
- Genus: Nyctemera
- Species: N. annulata

Binomial name
- Nyctemera annulata Boisduval, 1832

Synonyms
- Leptosoma annulatum Boisduval, 1832; Nyctemera annulatum (Boisduval, 1832); Nyctemera doubledayi Walker, 1854; Nyctemera tripunctaria Swinhoe, 1916

= Nyctemera annulata =

Species of moth

Nyctemera annulata, the magpie moth, is a moth of the family Erebidae. The species was first described by Jean Baptiste Boisduval in 1832. It is endemic to New Zealand and found in all parts of the country.

== Description ==
The magpie moth's "woolly bear" caterpillars are around 35–38 mm when fully grown and predominantly black with lines of red down its sides and back, blue spots and tufts of hair on each segment. Its liking for the introduced ragwort causes its caterpillars to be sometimes misidentified as those of the cinnabar moth which was introduced as a biological control for ragwort. By contrast cinnabar caterpillars have smooth bodies with alternating yellow and black rings.

The adult moth has black wings with white markings on both the forewings and hindwings. The forewings have two white spots that are more elongated while the hindwing only has a single spot near to the centre; the wingspan is 35–45 mm. The thorax and abdomen of the moth are black with bands of orange. The magpie moth is diurnal which, coupled with its colourful markings means it is often mistaken for a butterfly. It is most active from September to June in the mornings and evenings where it can be seen flying over the tops of host plants.

Nyctemera annulata is closely related to Nyctemera amica, an Australian species which also occurs in New Zealand. The two species may be able to interbreed.

== Subspecies ==
- Nyctemera annulata annulata (New Zealand)
- Nyctemera annulata antipodea Salmon, 1956 (Antipodes Islands)

== Distribution ==
=== Natural global range ===
Nyctemera annulata is only found in New Zealand.

=== New Zealand range ===
Nyctemera annulata is found all over New Zealand, both in the North and South Islands as well as on smaller outlying islands. The N. annulata caterpillar have the ability to freeze themselves and survive. This tolerance of cold weather and freezing temperatures has ensured they are able to exist throughout New Zealand.

=== Habitat preferences ===
Nyctemera annulata are only present in habitats where Senecio species occur. They are found most commonly in natural habitats but were also found to occur modified and urban habitats as long as Senecio host plants were present, either naturalized or native.

== Life cycle/phenology ==
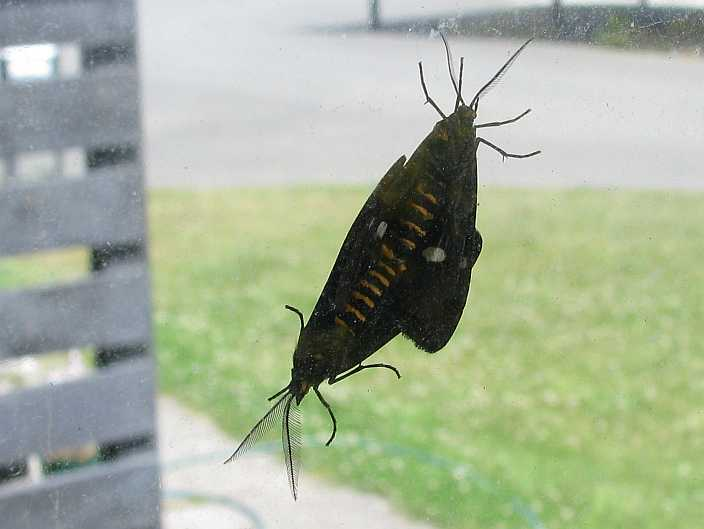
Mating

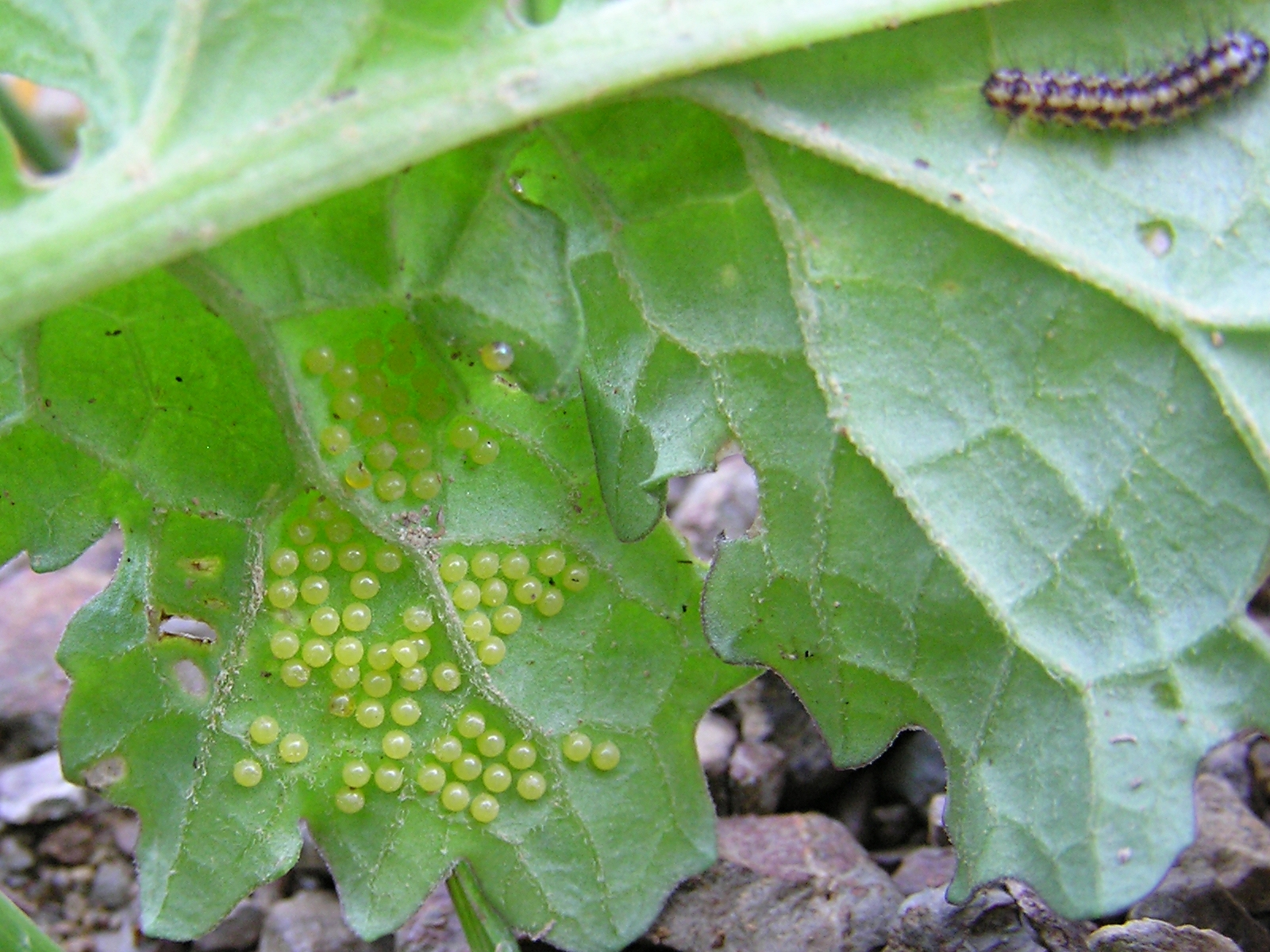
Eggs and early instar

The life cycle of Nyctemera annulata takes 6–7 weeks to complete and requires warm weather with the winter being passed in the pupa stage. The moth will lay yellow eggs on the undersides of herbaceous Senecio species. The eggs gradually become dark and will hatch after approximately 6 – 7 days. Larvae in the first to third developmental stages (instars) feed on the surface of the underside of the leaves of the host plants and use silken threads to move to new fresh food sources or to get back to the plant should they fall off. Fourth and fifth instars feed in exposed positions on the top surface of the leaf and have well-developed setae compared to the earlier instars. The larvae will feed primarily on species from the genus Senecio and are able to migrate considerable distances to new food sources when necessary. When the caterpillar is fully grown it will be approximately 36mm long and at this stage it begins to look for a crevice in which to spin its cocoon ready for pupation to take place. Hairs from the caterpillar are incorporated into its silken cocoon. The cocoon becomes black and shiny with yellow markings and the pupa will stay like this for 12 – 35 days. The length of pupation is largely affected by temperature and the humidity also has an effect on the pupal survival. The complete cycle of Nyctemera annulata takes 6 – 7 weeks depending on the temperature and therefore the time of year.

== Diet and foraging ==
The primary food source of Nyctemera annulata are plants from the tribe Senecioneae of the Asteraceae. Thirty three species are known to exist in the wild and New Zealand has 19 native Senecio species with 14 of them naturalised exotics. N. annulata diet is specifically limited to one specific plant. Even though the magpie moth is a native, it has been found that they do not restrict themselves to only the native Senecio species in New Zealand and will also feed on exotic introduced species.

N. annulata is a monophagous herbivore insect meaning that their diet is limited to a species of plant. A study found that N. annulata did not restrict itself to the native Senecio although the insects were found more frequently in the native forested areas than in the urban/rural area These findings are based on research in the Auckland area, and the study found that the numbers of Nyctemera would be far fewer if there were not the naturalised exotic species available to them.

The most common form of Senecio found in New Zealand is the introduced 'ragwort' (Jacobaea vulgaris) - a weed in most cultivated areas of the country and the magpie moth can often be seen around cultivated farmlands during the summer months and feed primarily on the leaves and flowers. Other favoured plants include Senecio vulgaris (groundsel) and garden cineraria.

== Predators, parasites, and diseases ==
Viruses, Subgroup B: Granulosis and Cytoplasmic polyhedrosis and two unidentified viruses can be found in Nyctemera annulata and these are all naturally occurring.

In addition, a predator known to attack N. annulata is a parasitic wasp. Echthromorpha intricatoria will attack by laying its egg into the pupae of the moth. The larvae of the wasp will then hatch and use the host as food to develop. It is believed that the patterning of the caterpillar acts as a warning to birds and as a result birds are not a threat to them.

Due to its bright colour and bitter taste N. annulata is left alone by most bird predators. The shining cuckoo is one exception and will prey on the spiny caterpillar. The cuckoos tend to leave the skin, only eating the viscera of the caterpillar. If the skins are swallowed they are later disposed of in pellets covered with saliva. One third of the caterpillars found in the stomach of shining cuckoos in a study were N. annulata.

== Cultural uses ==
Mokarakara is thought to be the name Māori used for N. annulata, their description being that it was a day-flying moth that was black with white spots (Miller, 1952).

Lessiter (1989) recorded that Māori knew butterflies as pūrerehua and that they referred to the pupa as tūngoungou (meaning "to nod"). This was describing the pupa's abdomen as it bends back and forth and the pupae were sometimes used in a child's game. Grandparents would ask their grandchildren to hold the pupa between their thumb and forefinger and ask questions of it. An example would be "Am I a good girl?". The answer would depend on which way the pupa wriggled – up to indicate "yes" and down was for "no".

There has been some research into the role of plant metabolites, particularly pyrrolizidine alkaloids that are sequestered by N. annulata. The alkaloids are produced by the plant as a defence against herbivory and the larvae of the moth take them up, potentially also as a form of defense suggested by the high levels of toxin found in the moth. This may be another reason there is not much predation of either the larvae or moth.

== Gallery ==
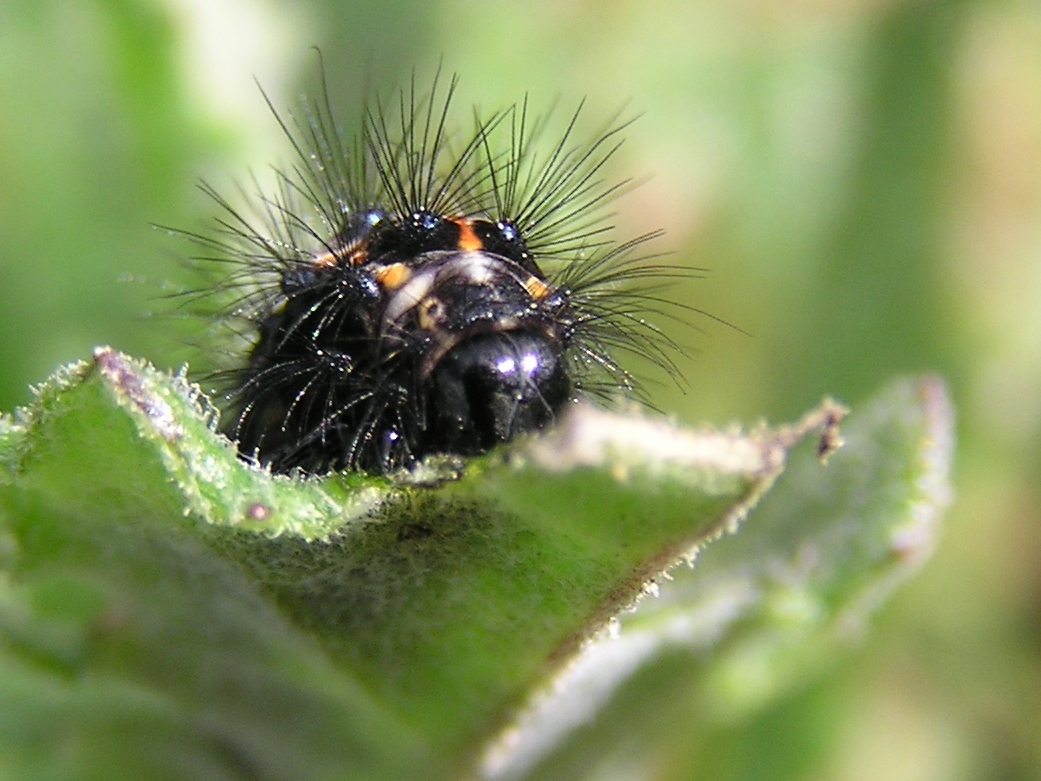
Caterpillar head

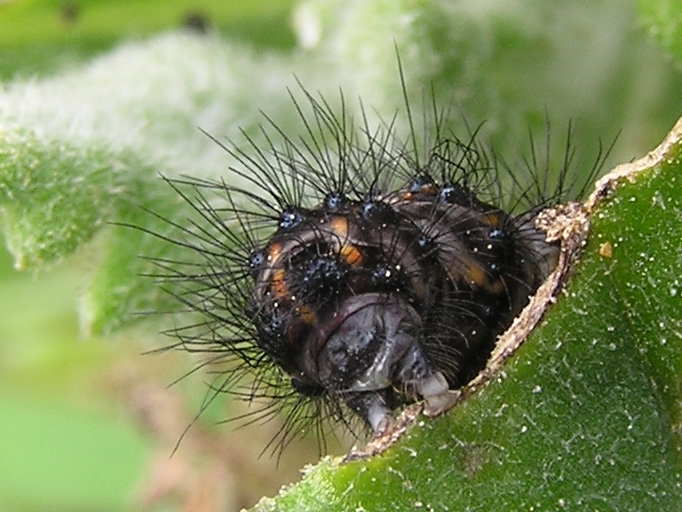
Caterpillar rear
