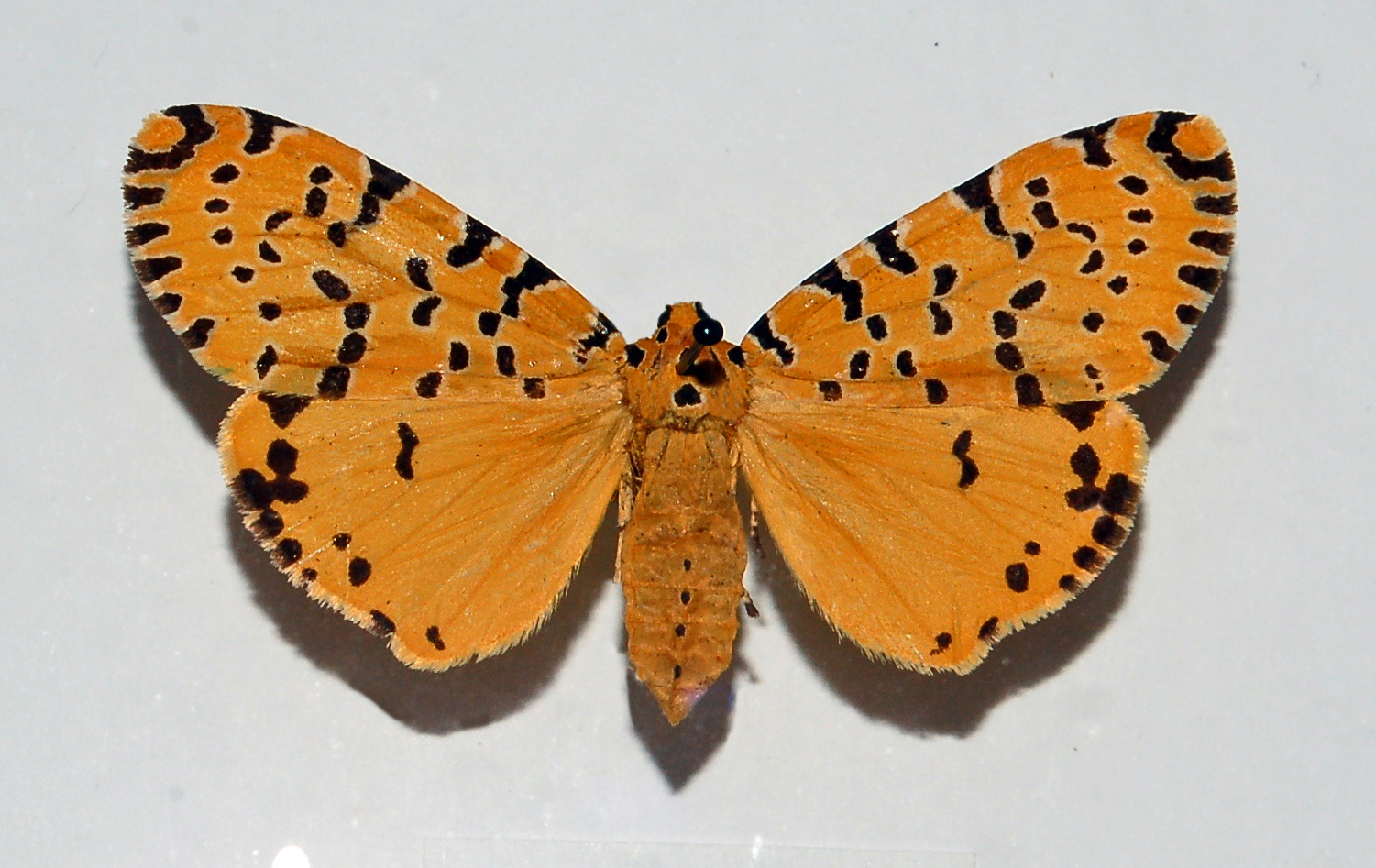
- Mounted Argina amanda

Scientific classification
- Kingdom: Animalia
- Phylum: Arthropoda
- Clade: Pancrustacea
- Class: Insecta
- Order: Lepidoptera
- Superfamily: Noctuoidea
- Family: Erebidae
- Subfamily: Arctiinae
- Subtribe: Nyctemerina
- Genus: Argina; Hübner, [1819]

Synonyms
- Alytarchia Wallengren, 1863; Alytarchia Wallengren, 1865; Xanthesthes Rambur, 1866; Lomaspilis Felder, 1874

= Argina =

Genus of moths

Argina is a genus of tiger moths in the family Erebidae. They are distributed throughout Africa, Mauritius, China, India, Sri Lanka, Myanmar, Andaman Islands, New Guinea and Australia.

== Description ==
Palpi upturned, reaching the vertex of head with short third joint. Antennae ciliated in both sexes. Mid and hind tibia with minute terminal spur pairs. Hindwing of male with a fold on inner margin containing a glandular patch near the base, with a tuft of long hair beyond it. The anal angle produced to a point. Forewing with veins 3 to 5 from close to angle of cell. Vein 6 from upper angle. Veins 7 and 10 from a long areole formed by the anastomosis of vein 8 and 9. Hindwing with veins 3 to 5 from angle of cell. Veins 6 and 7 from upper angle. Vein 8 from middle of cell.

== Taxonomy ==
Not long ago it was divided into three genera: Argina (A. cribraria), Alytarchia (A. amanda, A. leonina), Mangina (M. argus, M. syringa, M. pulchra).

== Species ==
The genus includes the following species:

- Argina amanda (Boisduval, 1847)
- Argina argus (Kollar, [1847])
- Argina astrea (Drury, 1773)
- Argina leonina (Walker, [1865])
- Argina pantheraria (Felder, 1874)

== Former species ==
For Argina argus, the new genus Mangina Kaleka & Kirti, 2001 was described. This genus also contains (Dubatolov, 2010):

- Mangina syringa (Cramer, 1775)
- Mangina pulchra (C. Swinhoe, 1892)
