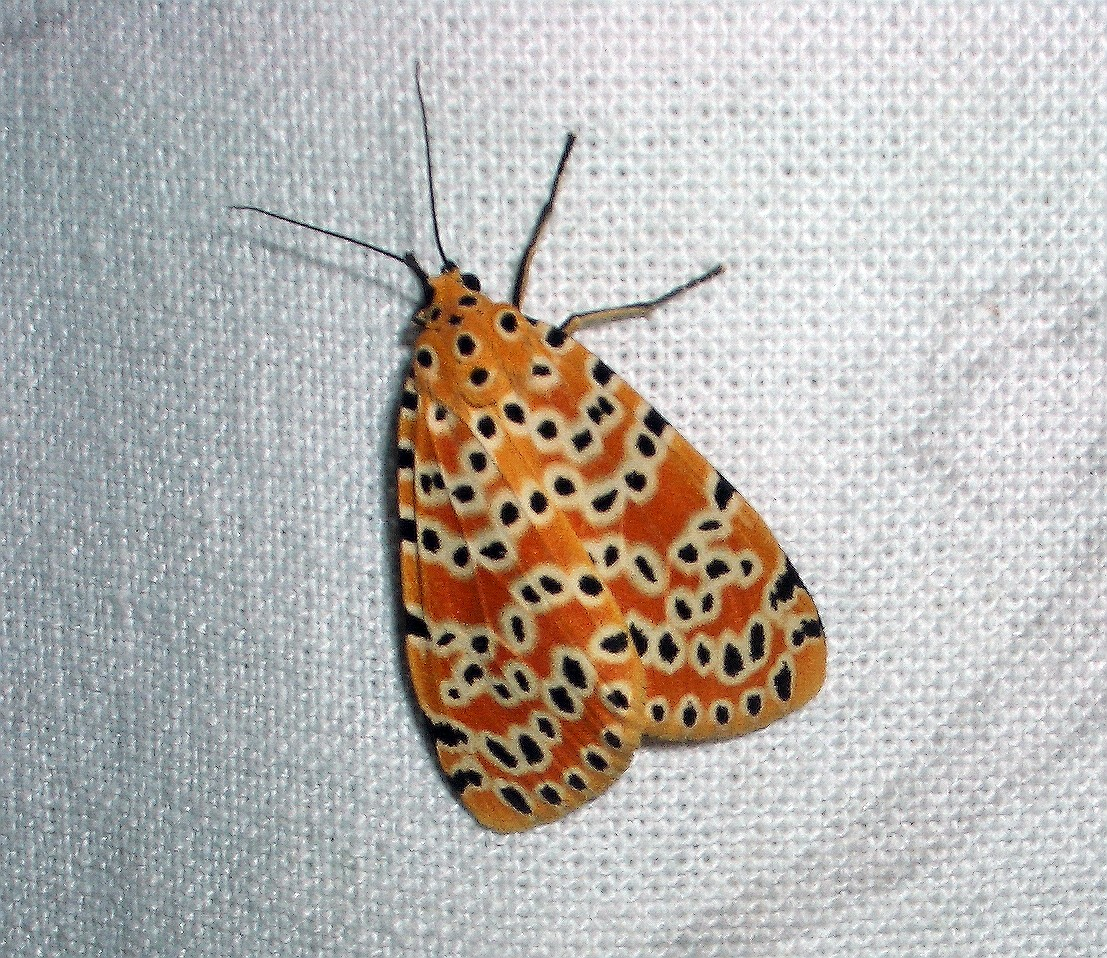

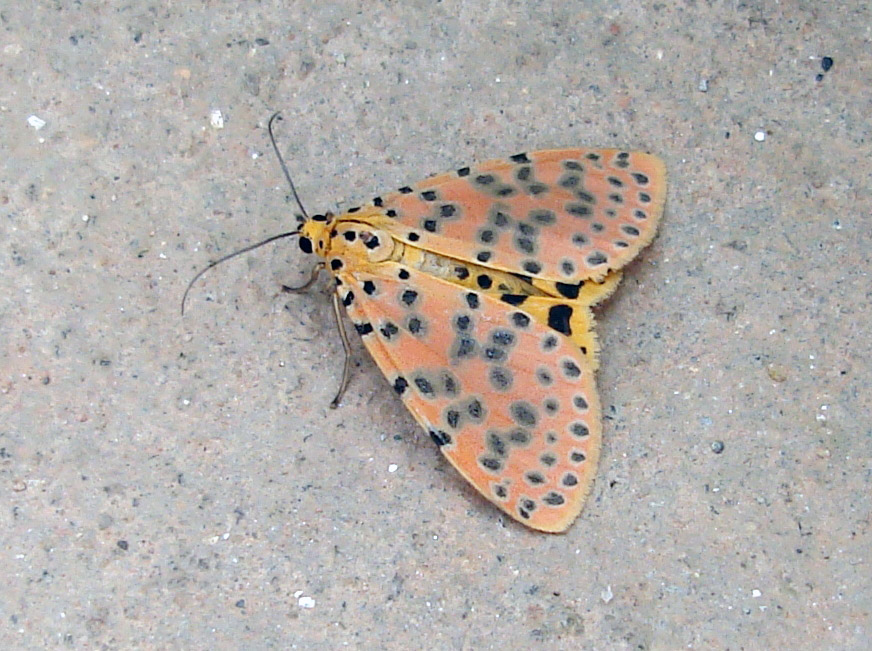

Scientific classification
- Domain: Eukaryota
- Kingdom: Animalia
- Phylum: Arthropoda
- Class: Insecta
- Order: Lepidoptera
- Superfamily: Noctuoidea
- Family: Erebidae
- Subfamily: Arctiinae
- Genus: Argina
- Species: A. astrea

Binomial name
- Argina astrea (Drury, 1773)

Synonyms
- List: Argena astrea; Phalaena astrea Drury, 1773; Phalaena cribraria Clerck, 1764; Bombyx pylotis Fabricius, 1775; Deiopeia dulcis Walker, 1854; Xanthestes guttata Rambur, 1866; Argina notata Butler, 1877; Argina pylotes Butler, 1877; Alpenus multiguttatus C. Swinhoe, 1892; Argina perforata Seitz, 1914; Argina detersa Hulstaert, 1923; Lomaspilis pantheraria Felder, 1874

= Argina astrea =

Crotalaria podborer

Species of moth

Argina astrea, the crotalaria podborer, is a moth of the family Erebidae. The species was first described by Dru Drury in 1773. It is found in eastern Africa, southern Asia of India, Sri Lanka, Maldives and Indo-Australia, including the Pacific Islands and Australia.

== Description ==
The wingspan is about 40 mm. The species is extremely variable in wing pattern as well as ground colour. It differs from Mangina argus in the head, thorax and forewing being orange yellowish or whitish. The abdomen and hindwings are bright orange. Markings and spots are similar to its neighbor species. The head of the caterpillar is reddish brown when fully grown. Its body is black with white intersegmental rings that contain broken black transverse lines. Spiracles are in orange patches.

== Ecology ==
The larvae feed on Crotalaria species. The species prefers secondary habitats ranging from the lowlands to the montane region.

== Subspecies ==
- Argina astrea astrea (China (Yunnan, Hong Kong, Zhejiang, Guangdong), Taiwan, Bangladesh, India, Sri Lanka, Nepal, Myanmar, Philippines, Japan (Ryukyu), Indochina, Indonesia, New Guinea, Australia, Oceania, eastern Africa, Ghana, Madagascar, Seychelles)
- Argina astrea pardalina Walker, 1864 (eastern Africa, Madagascar)
