= Afronyctemera =

Scientific classification (disputed)
- Domain: Eukaryota
- Kingdom: Animalia
- Phylum: Arthropoda
- Class: Insecta
- Order: Lepidoptera
- Superfamily: Noctuoidea
- Family: Erebidae
- Subfamily: Arctiinae
- Subtribe: Nyctemerina
- Genus: Afronyctemera; Dubatolov, 2006

Type species
- Deilemera itokina Aurivillius, 1904

Synonyms
- Nyctemera (Afronyctemera)

Genus of moths

Afronyctemera is a genus of moths erected by Vladimir Dubatolov in 2006. Its treatment varies by source, from being recognized as a valid genus to a valid subgenus of Nyctemera to being listed as doubtful to not being recognized at all.

== Species ==
AfroMoths, treating Afronyctemera as a subgenus, includes four species:

- Nyctemera (Afronyctemera) camerunica (Strand, 1909)
- Nyctemera (Afronyctemera) itokina (Aurivillius, 1904)
- Nyctemera (Afronyctemera) marcida (Swinhoe, 1906)
- Nyctemera (Afronyctemera) plana (Wichgraf, 1921)

When Afronyctemera is treated as a valid genus, it consists of one species that includes the rest of the above as synonyms:

- Afronyctemera itokina (Aurivillius, 1904)

Similarly, the Global Lepidoptera Index treats Afronyctemera itokina (their Nyctemera itokina) as valid and the other taxa mentioned above as its synonyms.
