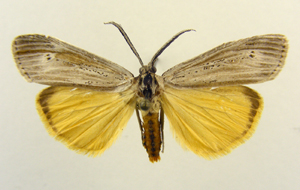
- Male

Scientific classification
- Domain: Eukaryota
- Kingdom: Animalia
- Phylum: Arthropoda
- Class: Insecta
- Order: Lepidoptera
- Superfamily: Noctuoidea
- Family: Erebidae
- Subfamily: Arctiinae
- Genus: Afrocoscinia; Dubatolov, 2011
- Species: A. aethiopica

Binomial name
- Afrocoscinia aethiopica (Kühne, 2010)

Synonyms
- Coscinia aethiopica

= Afrocoscinia =

Genus of moths

Afrocoscinia is a curious genus of tiger moths in the family Erebidae erected by Vladimir Viktorovitch Dubatolov in 2011. The genus includes only one species, Afrocoscinia aethiopica, described by Lars Kühne in 2010, which is found in the arid regions of the western part of South Africa. By the general appearance of wing and body shape, it looks like species of the Palearctic genus Coscinia from Callimorphina. But many other characteristics of this moth show that is it a member of the Nyctemerina.
