= Xylecata hemixantha =

Scientific classification
- Kingdom: Animalia
- Phylum: Arthropoda
- Class: Insecta
- Order: Lepidoptera
- Superfamily: Noctuoidea
- Family: Erebidae
- Subfamily: Arctiinae
- Genus: Xylecata
- Species: X. hemixantha

Binomial name
- Xylecata hemixantha (Aurivillius, 1904)

Synonyms
- Deilemera hemixantha Aurivillius, 1904; Deilemera anomala Holland, 1920

Species of moth

Xylecata hemixantha is a moth of the family Erebidae. It was described by Aurivillius in 1904, originally under the genus Deilemera. It is found in Angola, Cameroon, the Democratic Republic of Congo, Gabon and Rwanda.
