= Xylecata =

Scientific classification
- Kingdom: Animalia
- Phylum: Arthropoda
- Class: Insecta
- Order: Lepidoptera
- Superfamily: Noctuoidea
- Family: Erebidae
- Subfamily: Arctiinae
- Subtribe: Nyctemerina
- Genus: Xylecata; Swinhoe, 1904

Genus of moths

Xylecata is a genus of tiger moths in the family Erebidae.

== Species ==
- Xylecata biformis
- Xylecata crassiantennata
- Xylecata druna
- Xylecata glauce
- Xylecata hemixantha
- Xylecata rattrayi
- Xylecata ugandicola
- Xylecata uniformis
- Xylecata xanthura
