= Xylecata ugandicola =

Scientific classification
- Kingdom: Animalia
- Phylum: Arthropoda
- Class: Insecta
- Order: Lepidoptera
- Superfamily: Noctuoidea
- Family: Erebidae
- Subfamily: Arctiinae
- Genus: Xylecata
- Species: X. ugandicola

Binomial name
- Xylecata ugandicola (Strand, 1909)

Synonyms
- Deilemera ugandicola Strand, 1909

Species of moth

Xylecata ugandicola is a moth of the family Erebidae. It was described by Embrik Strand in 1909, originally under the genus Deilemera. It is found in the Democratic Republic of Congo and Uganda.
