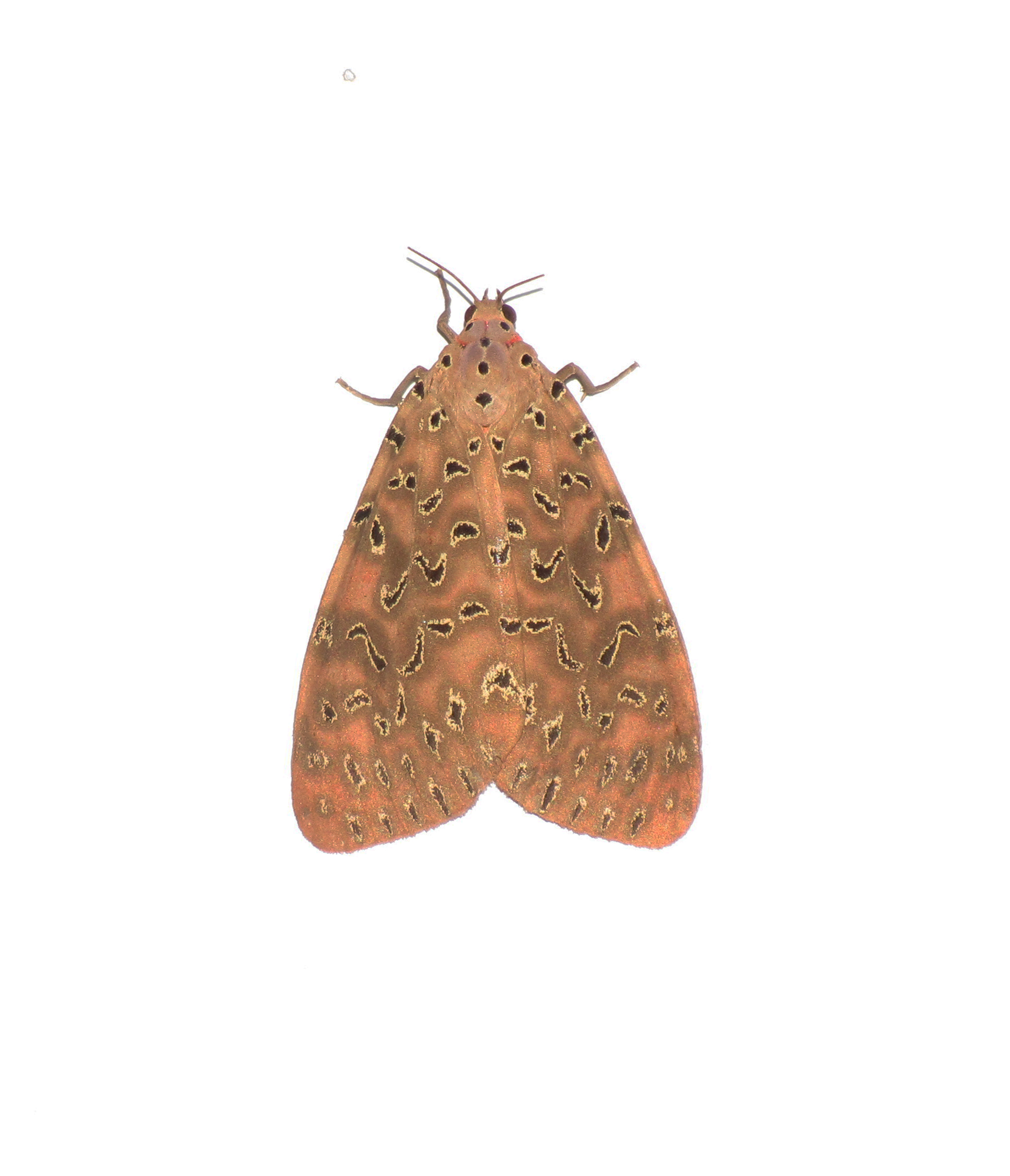

Scientific classification
- Kingdom: Animalia
- Phylum: Arthropoda
- Clade: Pancrustacea
- Class: Insecta
- Order: Lepidoptera
- Superfamily: Noctuoidea
- Family: Erebidae
- Subfamily: Arctiinae
- Genus: Mangina
- Species: M. syringa

Binomial name
- Mangina syringa (Cramer, 1775)

Synonyms
- Phalaena syringa Cramer, 1775; Bombyx crotolariae Fabricius, 1793; Argina syringa

= Mangina syringa =

Species of moth

Mangina syringa is a moth in the family Erebidae first described by Pieter Cramer in 1775. It is found from southern India to western Bengali and Sri Lanka.

== Description ==
It differs from the much more widely distributed species Mangina argus in that the head, thorax and forewings are pale pinkish brown. Its spots are larger and more prominent, where those on the forewing being placed on clouded fuscous bands. The abdomen and hindwings are crimson. Its larva is purplish-grey with sparse hairs. A series of black dorsal transverse bands and lateral spots are present. Its head is red. The pupa is in a thin network cocoon.
