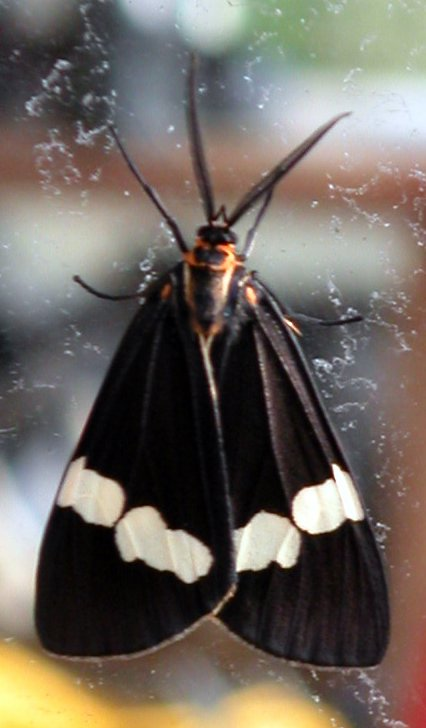
- Nyctemera annulata imago

Scientific classification
- Kingdom: Animalia
- Phylum: Arthropoda
- Class: Insecta
- Order: Lepidoptera
- Superfamily: Noctuoidea
- Family: Erebidae
- Subfamily: Arctiinae
- Tribe: Arctiini
- Subtribe: Nyctemerina; Kirby, 1892

= Nyctemerina =

Subtribe of moths

The Nyctemerina are a subtribe of woolly bear moths in the family Erebidae.

== Taxonomy ==
The subtribe was previously classified as the tribe Nyctemerini of the former family Arctiidae. Some authors merge the subtribe into the related Callimorphina.

== Genera ==
- Afrocoscinia
- Agaltara
- Caryatis
- Diota
- Galtara
- Ischnarctia
- Karschiola
- Neuroxena
- Pseudogaltara
- Xylecata

Argina generic group

- Alytarchia
- Argina
- Mangina

Afrotropical genera of the Nyctemera group, that were separated from the Oriental stem

- Afronyctemera
- Chiromachla
- Podomachla

Oriental and Australian taxa of generic level that are traditionally considered as subgenera of

- Nyctemera:
- Nyctemera (Arctata)
- Nyctemera (Coleta)
- Nyctemera (Deilemera)
- Nyctemera (Luctuosana)
- Nyctemera (Nyctemera)
- Nyctemera (Orphanos)
- Nyctemera (Tritomera)

Utetheisa is sometimes placed in Nyctemerina, sometimes in the Callimorphina (if these are treated as distinct subtribe).
