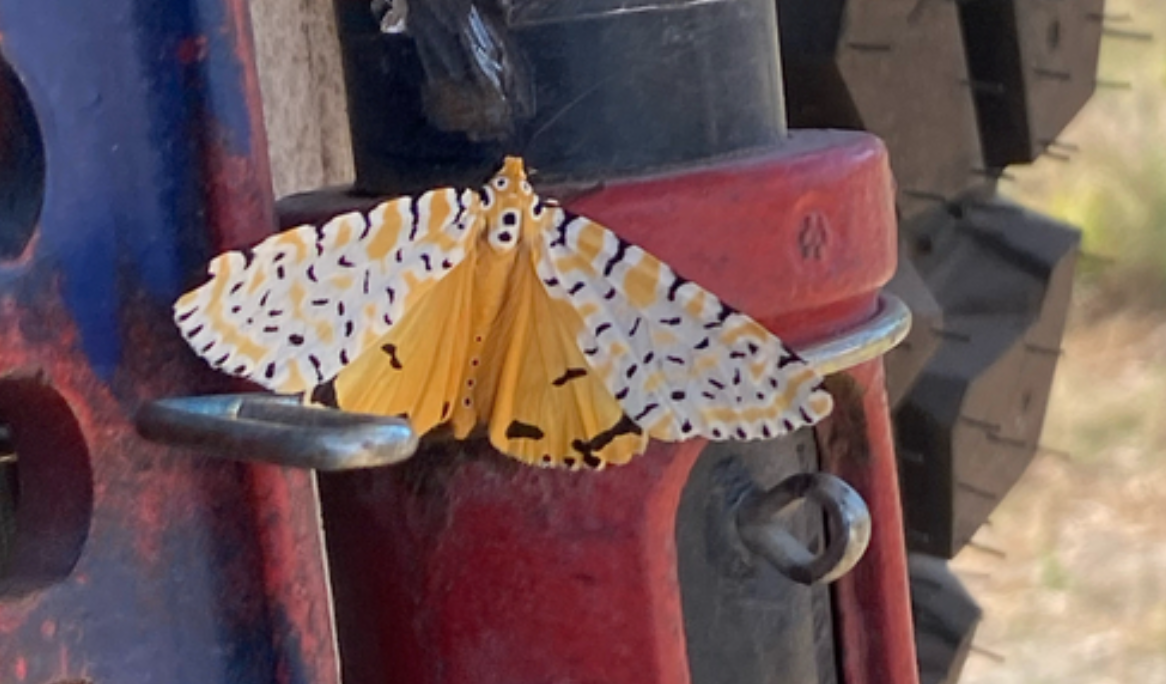

Scientific classification
- Kingdom: Animalia
- Phylum: Arthropoda
- Clade: Pancrustacea
- Class: Insecta
- Order: Lepidoptera
- Superfamily: Noctuoidea
- Family: Erebidae
- Subfamily: Arctiinae
- Genus: Alytarchia
- Species: A. leonina

Binomial name
- Alytarchia leonina (Walker, [1865])

Synonyms
- Deiopeia leonina Walker, [1865]; Argina leonina; Bombyx crotalariae Hübner, 1793

= Alytarchia leonina =

Species of moth

Alytarchia leonina is a moth of the family Erebidae. It was described by Francis Walker in 1865. It is found in the Democratic Republic of the Congo, the Gambia, Malawi, Nigeria, Sierra Leone, South Africa, Uganda as well as in India and Sri Lanka.
