= Xylecata rattrayi =

Scientific classification
- Domain: Eukaryota
- Kingdom: Animalia
- Phylum: Arthropoda
- Class: Insecta
- Order: Lepidoptera
- Superfamily: Noctuoidea
- Family: Erebidae
- Subfamily: Arctiinae
- Genus: Xylecata
- Species: X. rattrayi

Binomial name
- Xylecata rattrayi (C. Swinhoe, 1904)

Synonyms
- Deilemera rattrayi C. Swinhoe, 1904

Species of moth

Xylecata rattrayi is a moth of the family Erebidae first described by Charles Swinhoe in 1904. It is found in Angola, Cameroon, the Democratic Republic of the Congo, Kenya, Tanzania and Uganda.
