= Afronyctemera itokina =

Scientific classification
- Domain: Eukaryota
- Kingdom: Animalia
- Phylum: Arthropoda
- Class: Insecta
- Order: Lepidoptera
- Superfamily: Noctuoidea
- Family: Erebidae
- Subfamily: Arctiinae
- Genus: Afronyctemera
- Species: A. itokina

Binomial name
- Afronyctemera itokina (Aurivillius, 1904)

Synonyms
- Deilemera itokina Aurivillius, 1904; Nyctemera itokina (Aurivillius, 1904); Deilemera marcida Swinhoe, 1906; Deilemera camerunica Strand, 1909; Deilemera plana Wichgraf, 1921

Species of moth

Afronyctemera itokina or Nyctemera itokina is a moth of the family Erebidae. It was described by Per Olof Christopher Aurivillius in 1904. It is found in Angola, Burundi, Cameroon, the Democratic Republic of the Congo, Kenya, Malawi, Nigeria, Rwanda, Tanzania, Uganda and Zambia.

The larvae feed on Senecio species.
