= Xylecata uniformis =

Scientific classification
- Kingdom: Animalia
- Phylum: Arthropoda
- Class: Insecta
- Order: Lepidoptera
- Superfamily: Noctuoidea
- Family: Erebidae
- Subfamily: Arctiinae
- Genus: Xylecata
- Species: X. uniformis

Binomial name
- Xylecata uniformis (Plötz, 1880)

Synonyms
- Deilemera uniformis Plötz, 1880

Species of moth

Xylecata uniformis is a moth of the subfamily Arctiinae. It was described by Carl Plötz in 1880, originally under the genus Deilemera. It is found in the Ivory Coast.
