= Xylecata xanthura =

Scientific classification
- Kingdom: Animalia
- Phylum: Arthropoda
- Class: Insecta
- Order: Lepidoptera
- Superfamily: Noctuoidea
- Family: Erebidae
- Subfamily: Arctiinae
- Genus: Xylecata
- Species: X. xanthura

Binomial name
- Xylecata xanthura (Plötz, 1880)

Synonyms
- Leptosoma xanthura Plötz, 1880; Nyctemera simplex Walker, 1869

Species of moth

Xylecata xanthura is a moth of the subfamily Arctiinae. It was described by Carl Plötz in 1880, originally under the genus Leptosoma. It is found in Cameroon, the Democratic Republic of Congo, Gabon, Ghana, Malawi, Nigeria, Sierra Leone and Togo.
