= Xylecata glauce =

Scientific classification
- Kingdom: Animalia
- Phylum: Arthropoda
- Class: Insecta
- Order: Lepidoptera
- Superfamily: Noctuoidea
- Family: Erebidae
- Subfamily: Arctiinae
- Genus: Xylecata
- Species: X. glauce

Binomial name
- Xylecata glauce (Fawcett, 1916)

Synonyms
- Nyctemera glauce Fawcett, 1916

Species of moth

Xylecata glauce is a moth of the family Erebidae. It was described by James Farish Malcolm Fawcett in 1916, originally under the genus Nyctemera. It is found in Kenya and Uganda.
