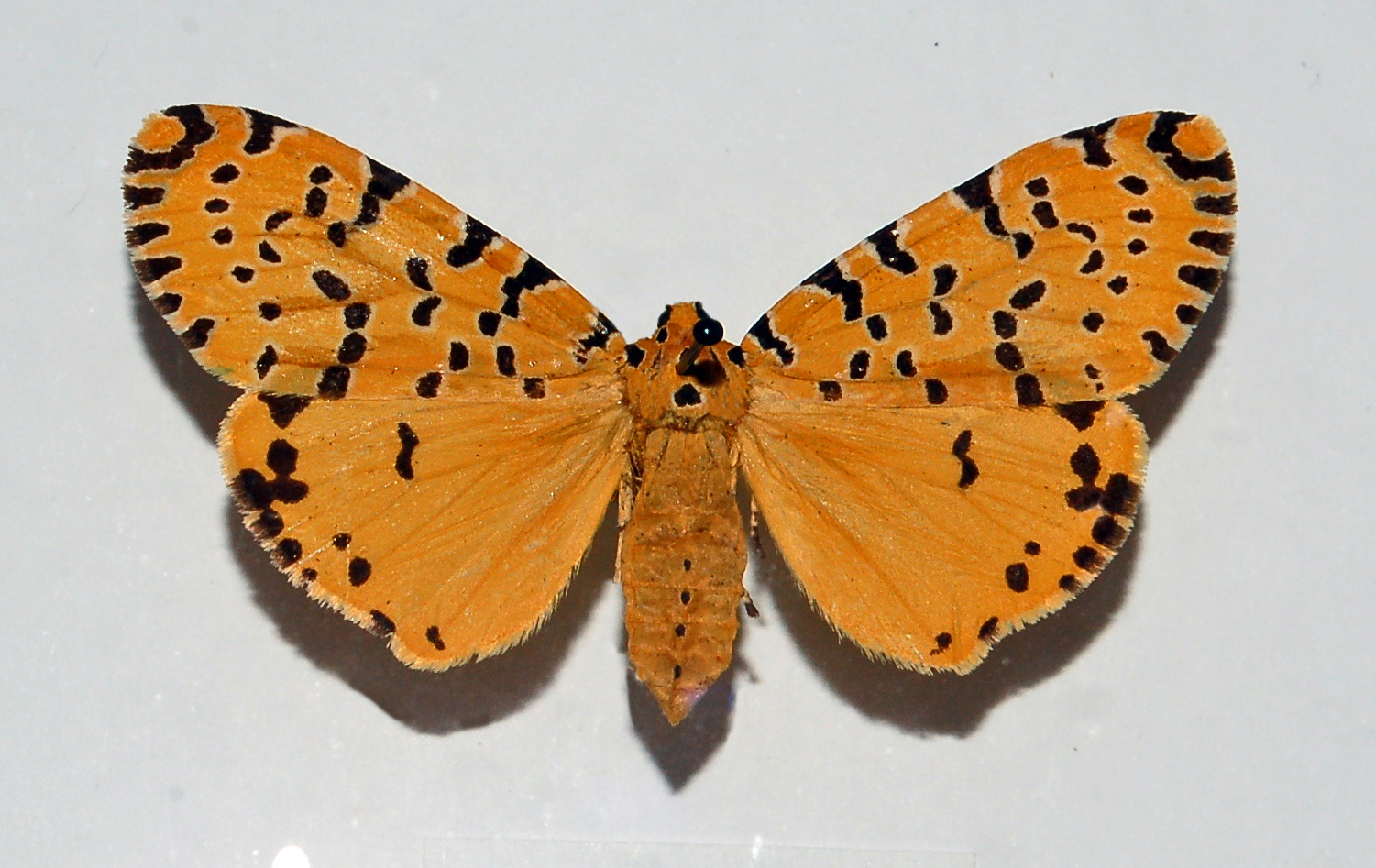
- Mounted specimen

Scientific classification
- Kingdom: Animalia
- Phylum: Arthropoda
- Clade: Pancrustacea
- Class: Insecta
- Order: Lepidoptera
- Superfamily: Noctuoidea
- Family: Erebidae
- Subfamily: Arctiinae
- Genus: Argina
- Species: A. amanda

Binomial name
- Argina amanda (Boisduval, 1847)

Synonyms
- Euchelia amanda Boisduval, 1847; Deiopeia cingulifera Walker, 1854; Deiopeia serrata Mabille, 1879; Xanthesthes albocincta Rambur, 1866; Deiopeia ocellina Walker, 1854

= Argina amanda =

Species of moth

Argina amanda, the cheetah, is a moth in the family Erebidae. The species was first described by Jean Baptiste Boisduval in 1847.

== Description ==
Argina amanda has a wingspan up to 40 millimetres (1.6 in) across. The uppersides of the forewings are orange, except the black markings with some white around them. The hindwings are orange too, with black spots on the edges. The undersides of the wings are very similar to the uppersides. The caterpillars feed on the young leaves and pods of Crotalaria species (Fabaceae).

== Distribution ==
This species is widespread in tropical Africa (Angola, Cameroon, the Democratic Republic of the Congo, Ethiopia, the Gambia, Guinea, Ivory Coast, Kenya, Malawi, Mozambique, Nigeria, Somalia, South Africa, Tanzania, Uganda, Zambia and Zimbabwe) and in Madagascar.
