= Xylecata crassiantennata =

Scientific classification
- Kingdom: Animalia
- Phylum: Arthropoda
- Class: Insecta
- Order: Lepidoptera
- Superfamily: Noctuoidea
- Family: Erebidae
- Subfamily: Arctiinae
- Genus: Xylecata
- Species: X. crassiantennata

Binomial name
- Xylecata crassiantennata (Oberthür, 1916)

Synonyms
- Nyctemera crassiantennata Oberthür, 1916

Species of moth

Xylecata crassiantennata is a moth of the subfamily Arctiinae. It was described by Charles Oberthür in 1916, originally under the genus Nyctemera. It is found on Madagascar.
