= Xylecata druna =

Scientific classification
- Kingdom: Animalia
- Phylum: Arthropoda
- Class: Insecta
- Order: Lepidoptera
- Superfamily: Noctuoidea
- Family: Erebidae
- Subfamily: Arctiinae
- Genus: Xylecata
- Species: X. druna

Binomial name
- Xylecata druna (C. Swinhoe, 1904)

Synonyms
- Nyctemera druna C. Swinhoe, 1904

Species of moth

Xylecata druna is a moth of the subfamily Arctiinae first described by Charles Swinhoe in 1904, originally under the genus Nyctemera. It is found in Cameroon, the Democratic Republic of the Congo, Equatorial Guinea, Gabon and Ghana.
