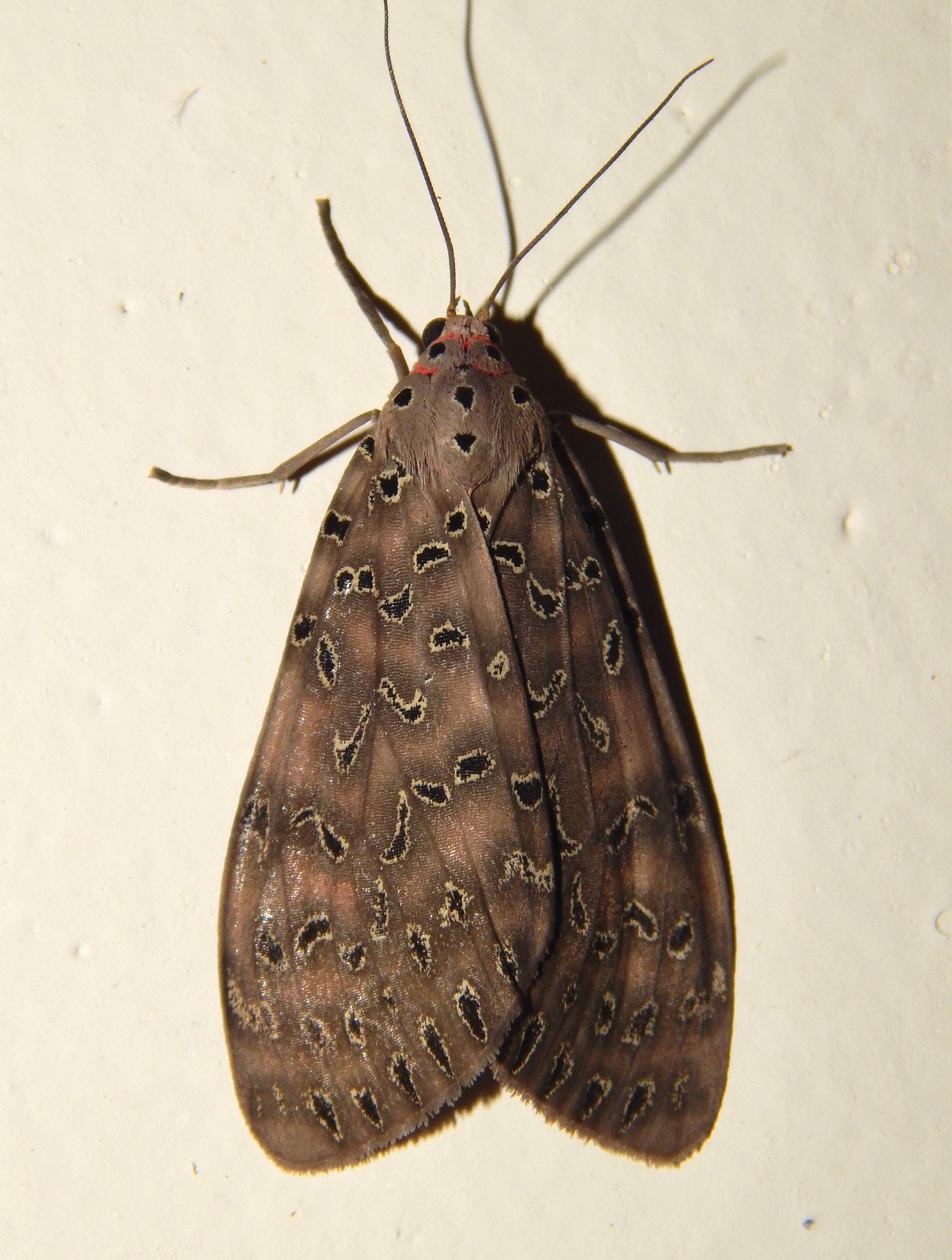
- Mangina argus

Scientific classification
- Domain: Eukaryota
- Kingdom: Animalia
- Phylum: Arthropoda
- Class: Insecta
- Order: Lepidoptera
- Superfamily: Noctuoidea
- Family: Erebidae
- Subfamily: Arctiinae
- Subtribe: Nyctemerina
- Genus: Mangina; Kaleka et Kirti, 2001

= Mangina (moth) =

Genus of moths

Mangina is a genus of tiger moths in the family Erebidae.

== Species ==
- Mangina argus (Kollar, [1847])
- Mangina syringa (Cramer, 1775)
- Mangina pulchra (Swinhoe, 1892)
