= Mangina pulchra =

Scientific classification
- Domain: Eukaryota
- Kingdom: Animalia
- Phylum: Arthropoda
- Class: Insecta
- Order: Lepidoptera
- Superfamily: Noctuoidea
- Family: Erebidae
- Subfamily: Arctiinae
- Genus: Mangina
- Species: M. pulchra

Binomial name
- Mangina pulchra (C. Swinhoe, 1892)

Synonyms
- Argina pulchra C. Swinhoe, 1892; Argina callargus Reich, 1932

Species of moth

Mangina pulchra is a moth of the family Erebidae. It was described by Charles Swinhoe in 1892. It is found in the Philippines.
