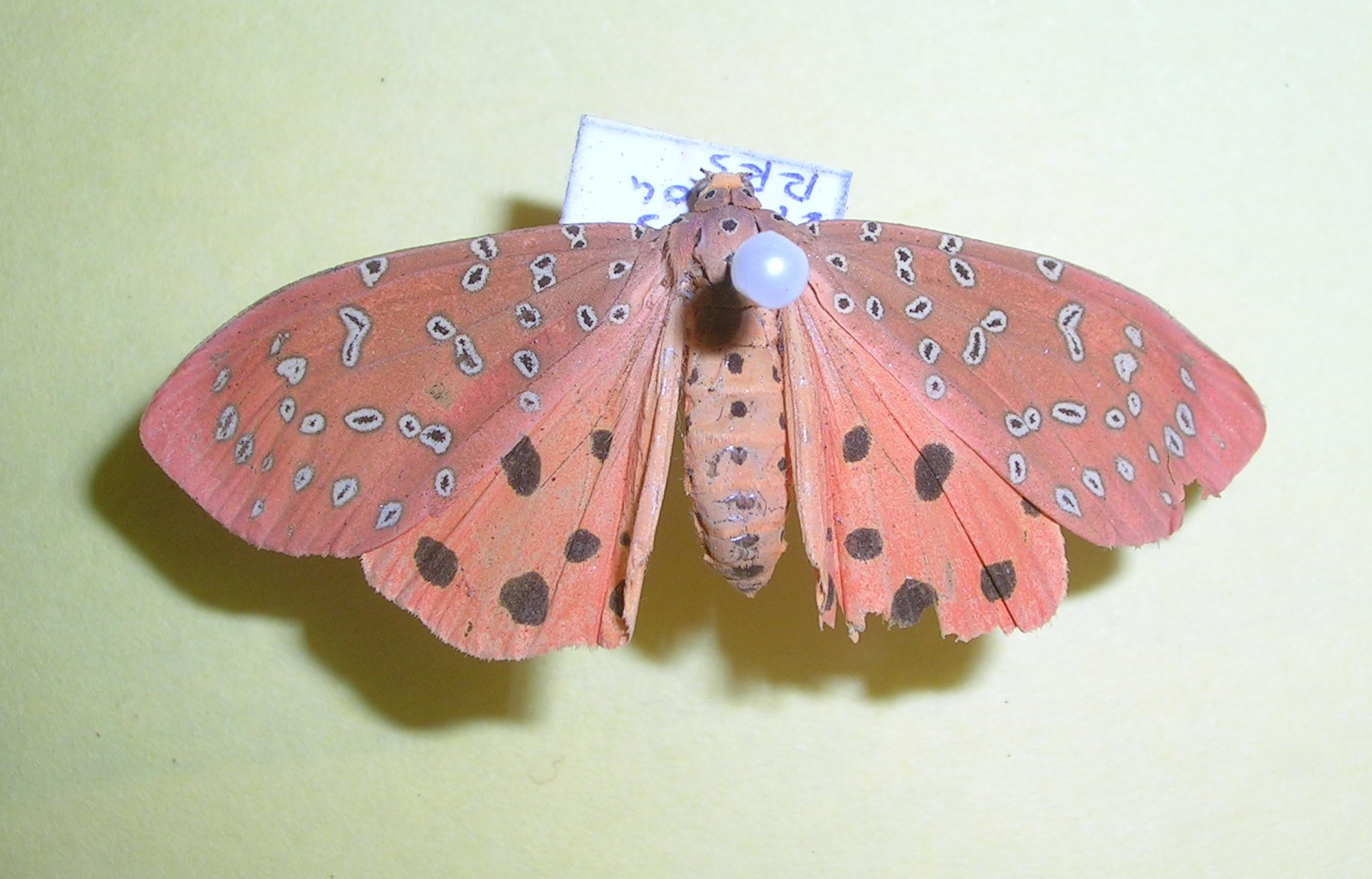

Conservation status
- Not evaluated (IUCN 3.1)

Scientific classification
- Kingdom: Animalia
- Phylum: Arthropoda
- Clade: Pancrustacea
- Class: Insecta
- Order: Lepidoptera
- Superfamily: Noctuoidea
- Family: Erebidae
- Subfamily: Arctiinae
- Genus: Mangina
- Species: M. argus

Binomial name
- Mangina argus (Kollar, [1847])

Synonyms
- Argina argus; Aigina argus

= Mangina argus =

Species of moth

Mangina argus, the crotalaria podborer, is a moth of the family Erebidae. The species was first described by Vincenz Kollar in 1847. It is found in south-east Asia, including Zhejiang, Fujian, Jiangxi, Guangxi, Guangdong, Yunnan, Taiwan, Hunan, from southern India to Kashmir, the Himalayas, Nepal, Bhutan and Sri Lanka.

== Description ==
Adults with pinkish or brownish red head, thorax and forewing. Two black yellow-ringed spots on collar, two spots on tegula, and three spots on thorax. The collar outlined with brilliant scarlet. Abdomen scarlet with black spots on dorsal, ventral and two paired lateral series. Forewing with six transverse series of yellow-ringed black spots, each series curved, irregularly disposed and variable as to size and number, the postmedial series bifurcating towards the costa. Hindwings also scarlet with one black spot at end of cell, another spot at origin of vein 2, another spot at its middle, and a submarginal series. There are a few small spots on margin, all these being somewhat variable. Larva purple-black with a few dorsal hairs. Head and a lateral line from 4th to 10th somites are reddish. A dorsal series of transverse white streaks.
